= J. Paul Getty Museum =

Art museum in Los Angeles, California, US

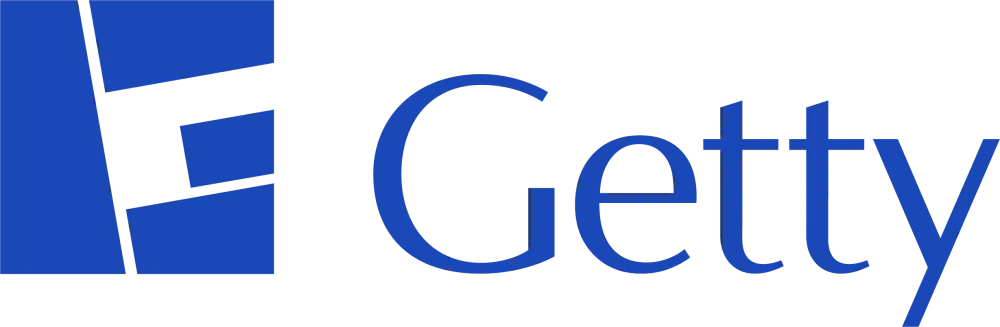

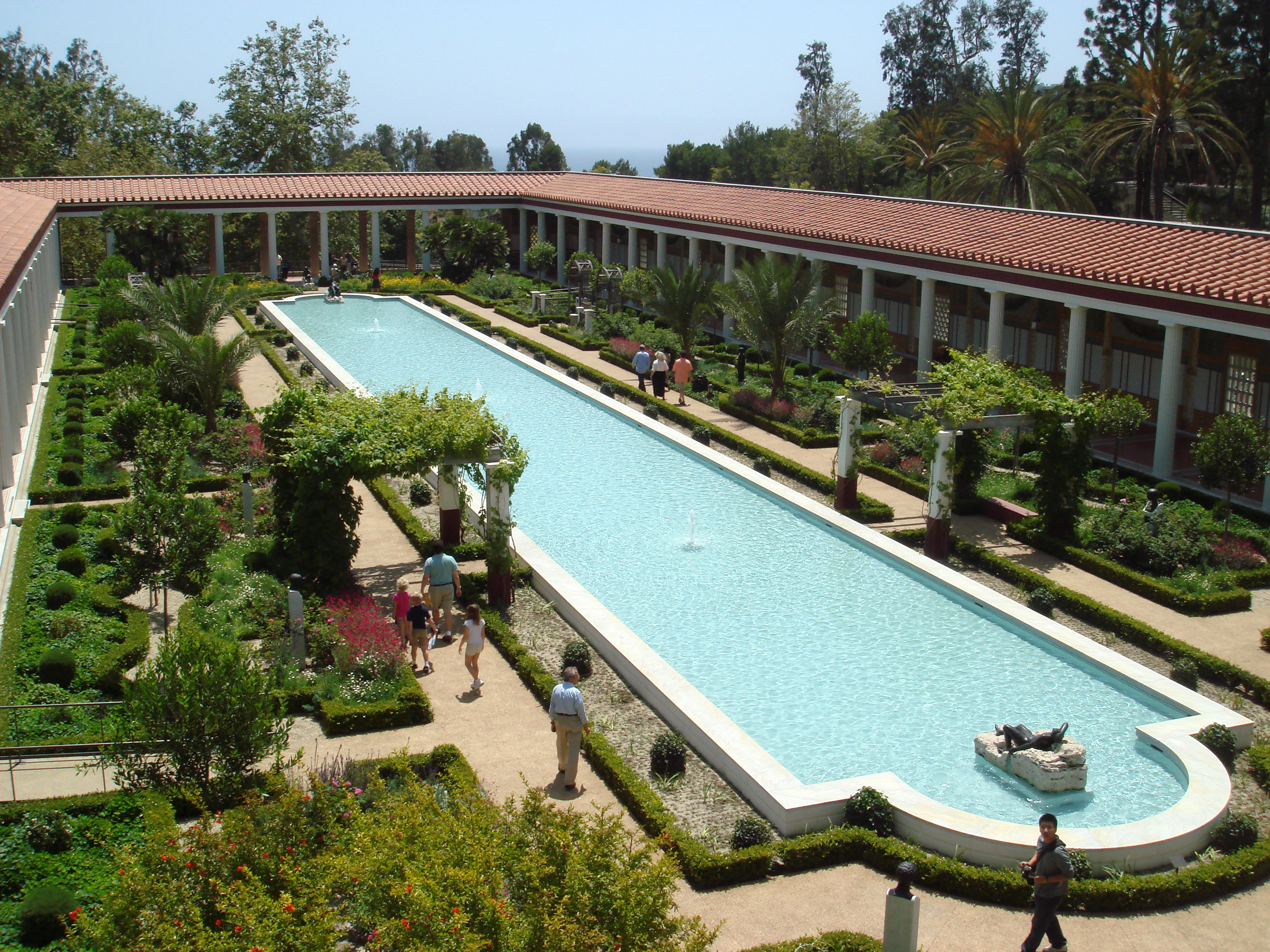
- Aerial view of the J. Paul Getty Museum in 2016 The Getty Villa in 2007 Top: Getty Center; bottom: Getty Villa
- Interactive fullscreen map
- Established: 1974
- Location: 1200 Getty Center Drive, Los Angeles, California; and 17985 Pacific Coast Highway, Pacific Palisades, Los Angeles, California
- Coordinates: 34°04′39″N 118°28′30″W
- Type: Art museum
- Visitors: 2,023,467 (2016)
- Director: Timothy Potts
- Website: getty.edu/museum

The J. Paul Getty Museum, commonly referred to as the Getty, is an American art museum in Los Angeles, California, housed on two campuses: the Getty Center and Getty Villa. It is operated by the J. Paul Getty Trust, the world's wealthiest art institution.

The Getty Center is located in the Brentwood neighborhood of Los Angeles on a cliff overlooking the Sepulveda Pass. It features pre-20th-century European paintings, drawings, illuminated manuscripts, sculpture, decorative arts, and photographs from the inception of photography through present day from all over the world. The original Getty museum, the Getty Villa, is located on a cliff overlooking the Pacific Ocean in the Pacific Palisades neighborhood. It displays art from Ancient Greece, Rome, and Etruria.

== History ==
In 1974, Jean Paul Getty opened a museum in a re-creation of the Villa of the Papyri at Herculaneum on his property in Malibu, California. In 1982, the museum became the richest in the world when it inherited US$1.2 billion. In 1983, after an economic downturn in West Germany, the Getty Museum acquired 144 illuminated medieval manuscripts from the financially struggling Ludwig Collection in Aachen.

In 1996, John Russell, writing in The New York Times, said of the collection, "One of the finest holdings of its kind ever assembled, it is quite certainly the most important that was in private hands." In 1997, the museum moved to its current location in the Brentwood neighborhood of Los Angeles. The Malibu museum, renamed the "Getty Villa", was renovated and reopened in 2006.

Many museums turned to their existing social media presences to engage their audience online during the COVID-19 pandemic. Inspired by the Rijksmuseum in Amsterdam and Instagram accounts such as the Dutch Tussen Kunst & Quarantaine ("between art and quarantine") and Covid Classics, the Getty sponsored the Getty Museum Challenge, inviting people to use everyday objects to recreate works of art and share their creations on social media, prompting thousands of submissions. The museum was among those singled out for particular praise by industry analysts for their successful social media content strategy during the shutdown, both for the challenge and for incorporating its works into the popular video game Animal Crossing. Following the 2025 Southern California wildfires, in April 2025, the Getty sold $500 million in bonds to raise money to protect its collection from fire.

== Controversies with Italy and Greece ==
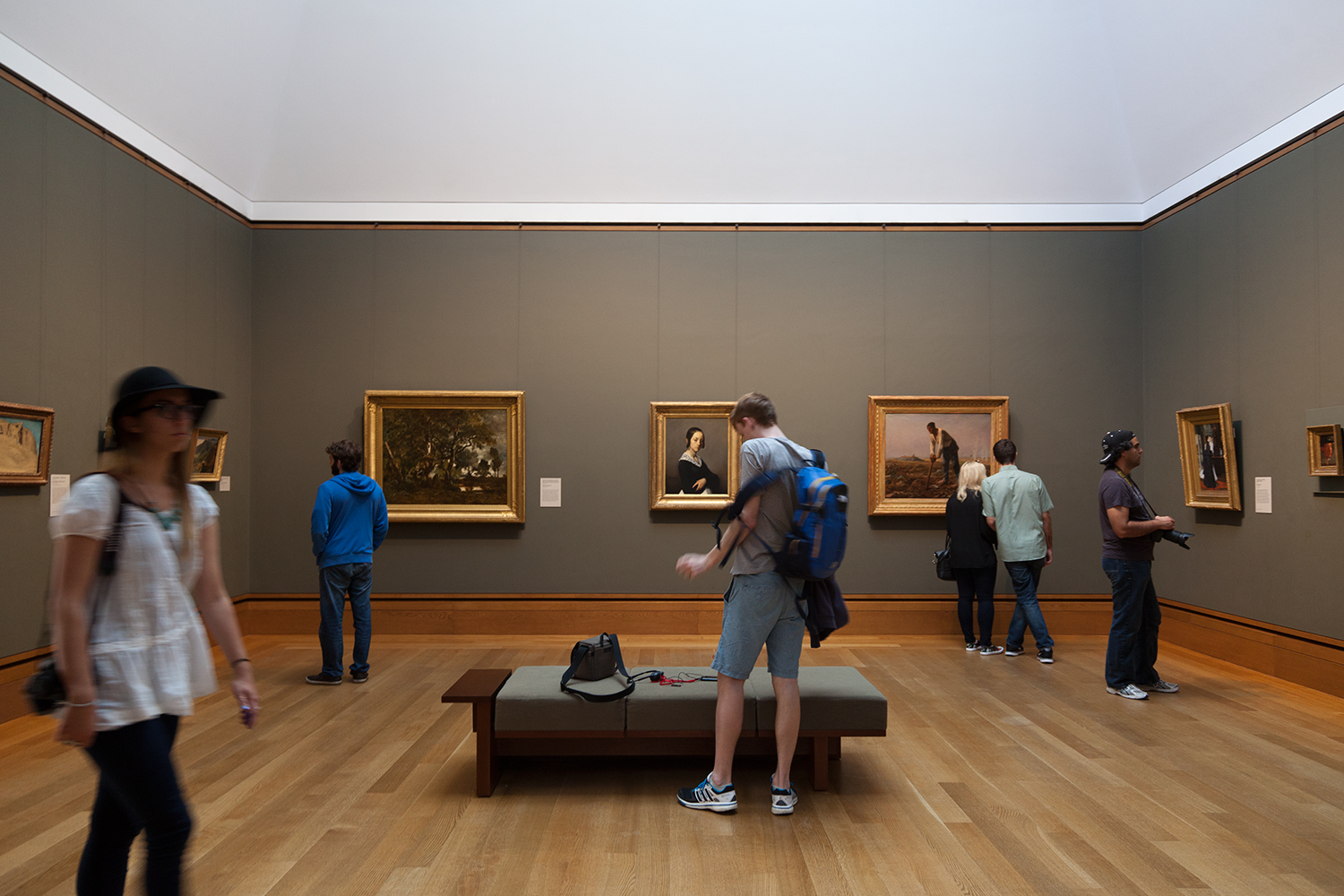
The Getty attracts approximately 1.8 million visitors a year.

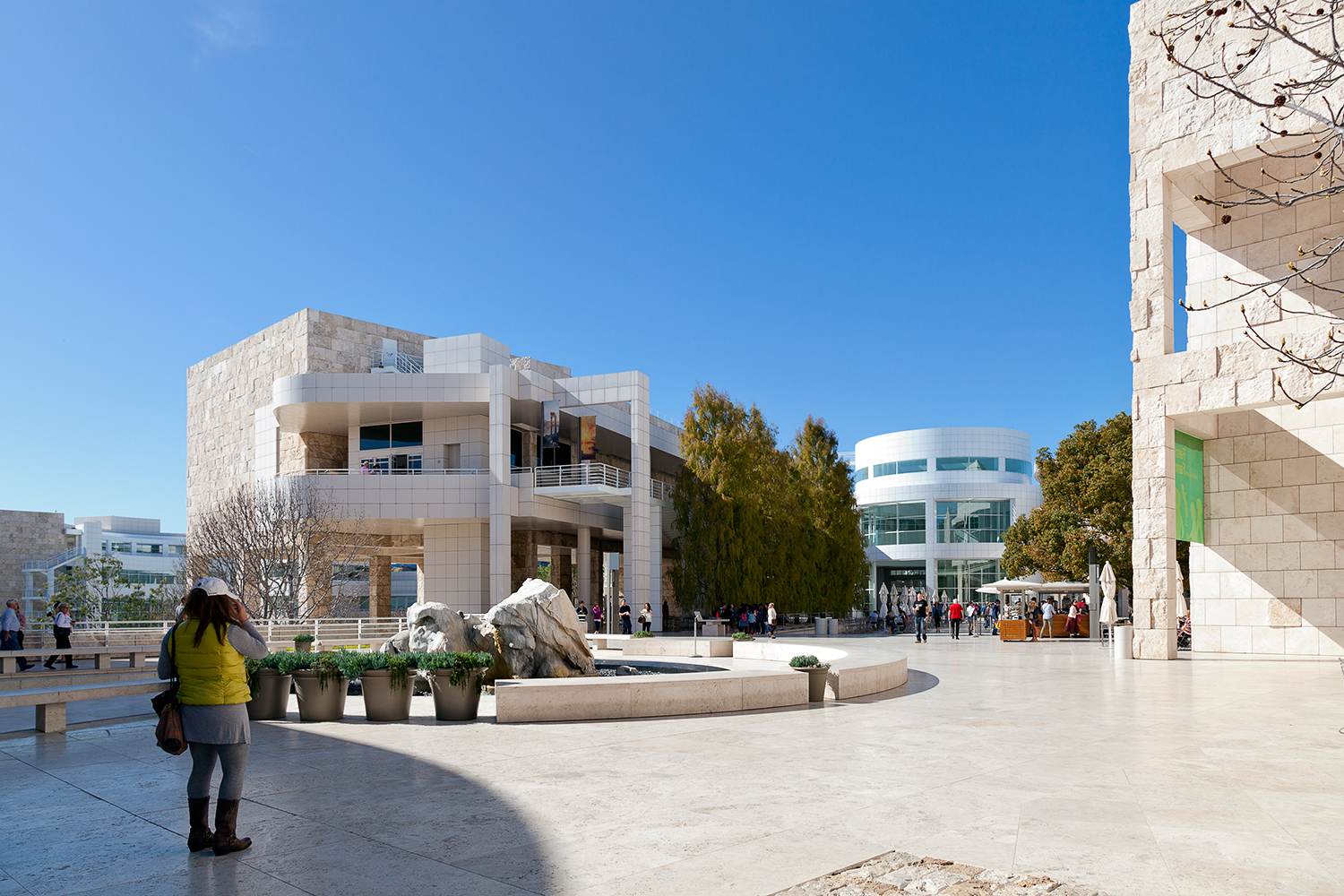
Architect Richard Meier chose beige-colored Italian travertine panels to cover the retaining walls and to serve as paving stones for the arrival plaza and museum courtyard.

In the 1970s and 1980s, the curator, Jiří Frel, designed a tax manipulation scheme which expanded the museum collection of antiquities, essentially buying artifacts of dubious provenance, as well as a number of artifacts generally considered fakes, such as the Getty kouros. In 1984, Frel was demoted, and in 1986, he resigned.

The Getty is involved in a controversy regarding proper title to some of the artwork in its collection. The museum's previous curator of antiquities, Marion True, hired by Frel, was indicted in Italy in 2005, along with famed dealer Robert E. Hecht, on criminal charges relating to trafficking in stolen antiquities. Similar charges have been addressed by the Greek authorities. The primary evidence in the case came from the 1995 raid of a Geneva, Switzerland, warehouse which had contained a fortune in stolen artifacts.

Italian art dealer Giacomo Medici was arrested in 1997. His operation was thought to be "one of the largest and most sophisticated antiquities networks in the world, responsible for illegally digging up and spiriting away thousands of top-drawer pieces and passing them on to the most elite end of the international art market". In 2005 True was forced to tender her resignation by the Board of Trustees, which announced her early retirement. Italy allowed the statute of limitations of the charges filed against her to expire in October 2010.

In a letter to the J. Paul Getty Trust in December 2006, True stated that she was being made to "carry the burden" for practices which were known, approved, and condoned by the Getty's board of directors. True is currently under investigation by Greek authorities over the acquisition of a 2,500-year-old funerary wreath, that was illegally excavated and smuggled out of Greece. The wreath, along with a 6th-century BC statue of a kore, have been returned to Greece and are currently exhibited at the Archaeological Museum of Thessaloniki. A 2,400-year-old, black limestone stele and a marble votive relief dating from about 490 BC were also returned.

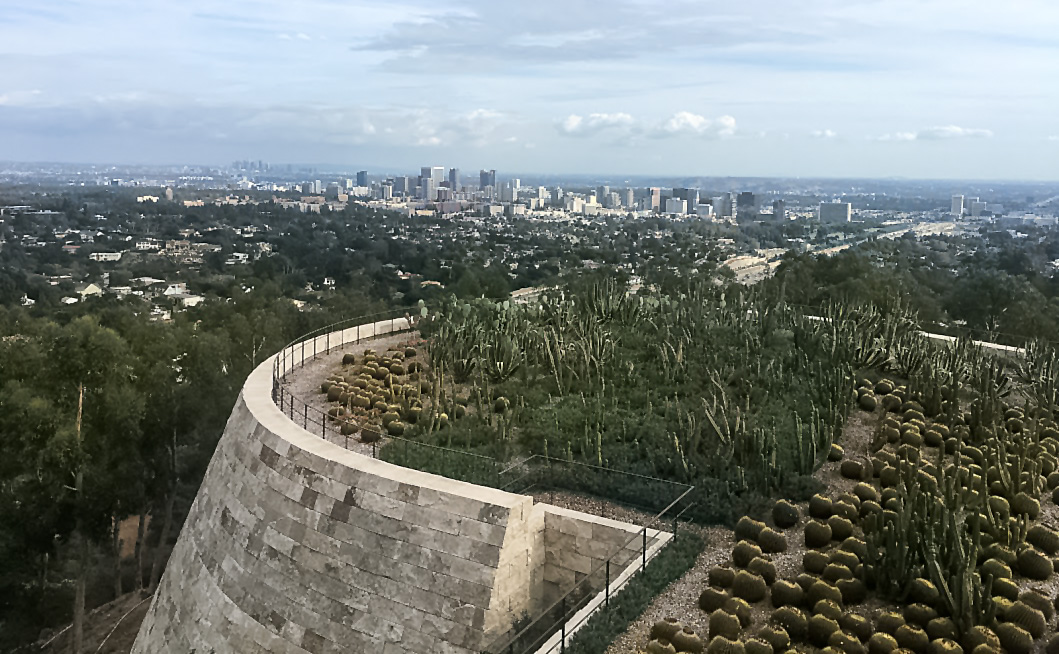
The succulent garden at the Getty Center

In November 2006, the director of the museum, Michael Brand, announced that 26 disputed pieces were to be returned to Italy, but not the Victorious Youth, which is still claimed by the Italian authorities. In 2007, the Los Angeles J. Paul Getty Museum was forced to return 40 artifacts, including a 5th-century BC statue of the goddess Aphrodite, which was looted from Morgantina, an ancient Greek settlement in Sicily. The Getty Museum resisted the requests of the Italian government for nearly two decades, only to admit later that "there might be 'problems'" attached to the acquisition." In 2006, Italian senior cultural official Giuseppe Proietti said: "The negotiations haven't made a single step forward." Only after he suggested that the Italian government should "take cultural sanctions against the Getty, suspending all cultural cooperation," did the J. Paul Getty Museum return the antiquities.

In another unrelated case in 1999, the Getty Museum had to hand over three antiquities to Italy after determining they were stolen. The objects included a Greek red-figure kylix from the 5th-century BC, signed by the painter Onesimos and the potter Euphronios as potter, looted from the Etruscan site of Cerveteri; a torso of the god Mithra from the 2nd-century AD, and the head of a youth by the Greek sculptor Polykleitos.

In 2016, the terracotta head of the Greek god Hades was returned to Sicily (Italy). The archaeological artifact was looted from Morgantina in the 1970s. The Getty museum purchased the terracotta head of Hades in 1985 from the New York collector Maurice Tempelsman, who had purchased it from the London dealer Robin Symes. Getty records show the museum paid $530,000 for it. In December 2016, the head of Hades was added to the collection of the archaeological museum of Aidone, where it joined the statue of Demeter, the mother of his consort Persephone. Sicilian archaeologists found a blue curl that was missing from Hades' beard, and so it proved the origin of the terracotta head.

== Selected paintings at the Getty Center ==
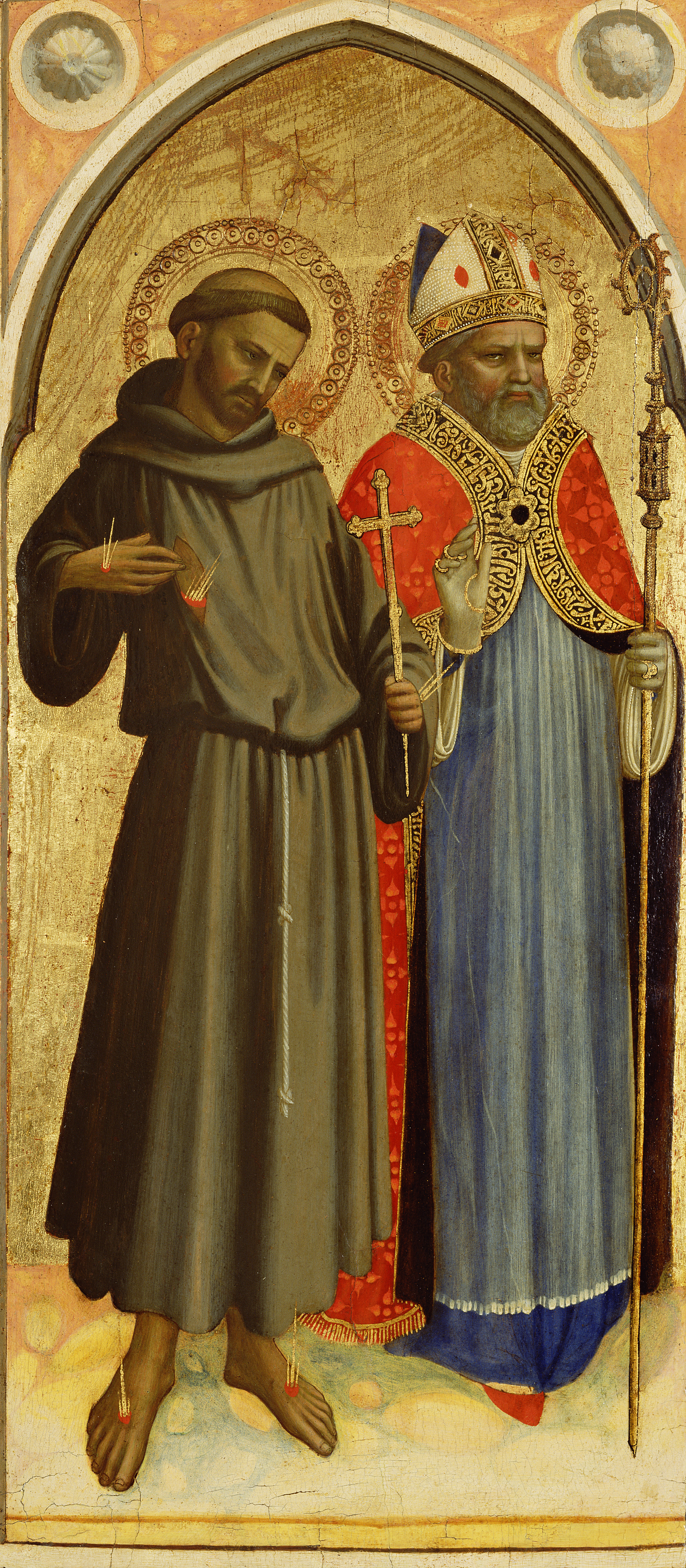
Fra Angelico Saint Francis and a Bishop Saint, 1420

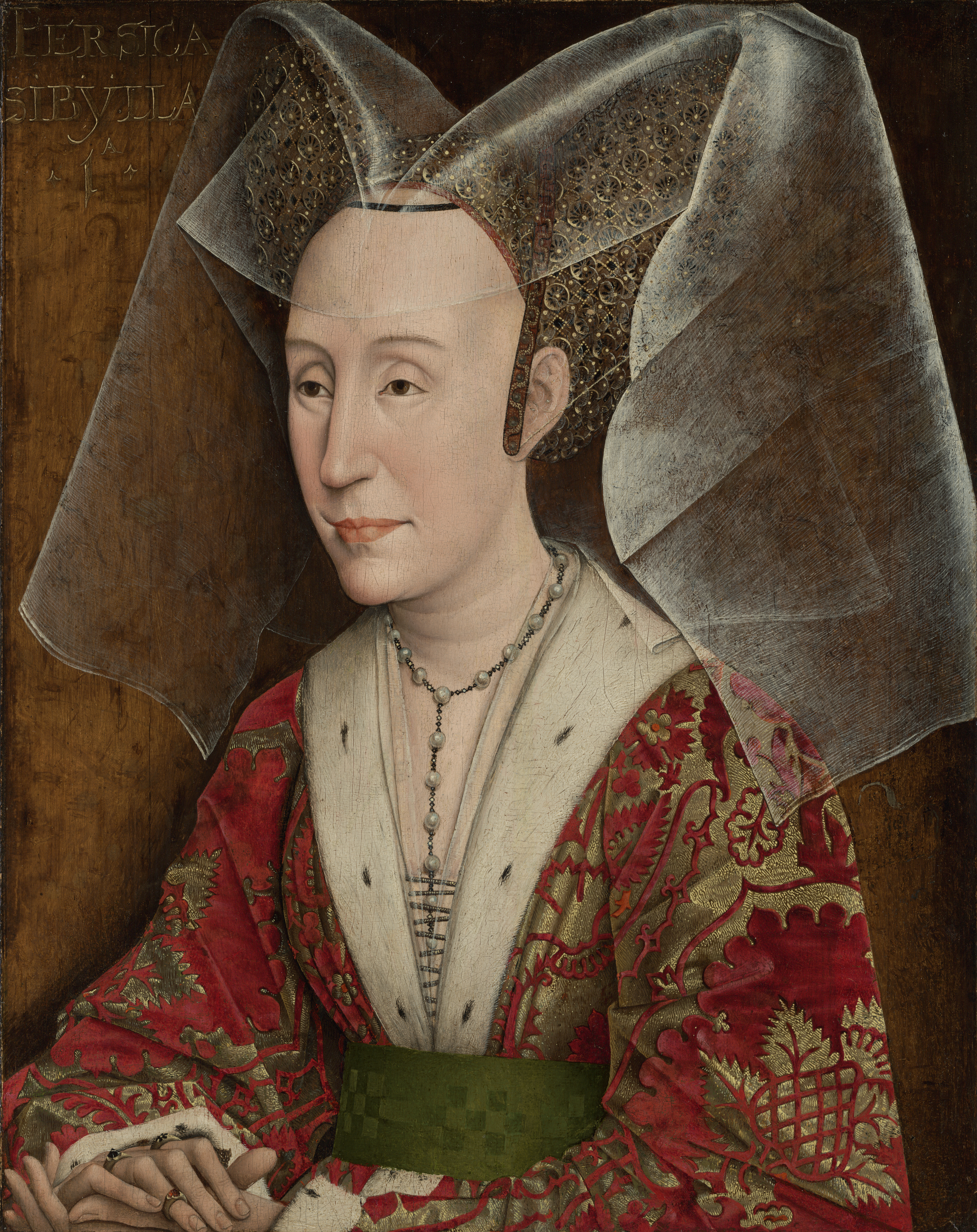
Circle of Rogier van der Weyden Portrait of Isabella of Portugal, 1450

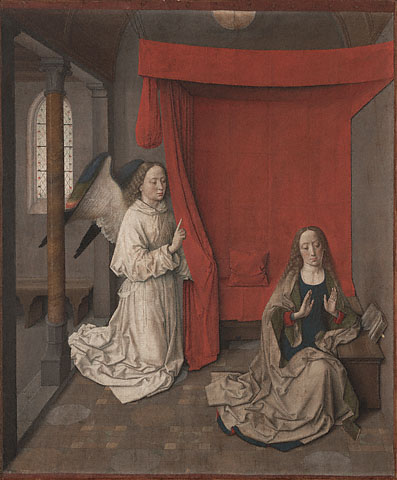
Dieric Bouts Annunciation, 1450-1455

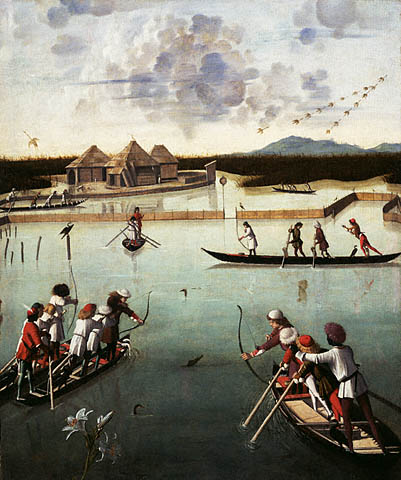
Vittore Carpaccio Hunting on the Lagoon, 1455-1465

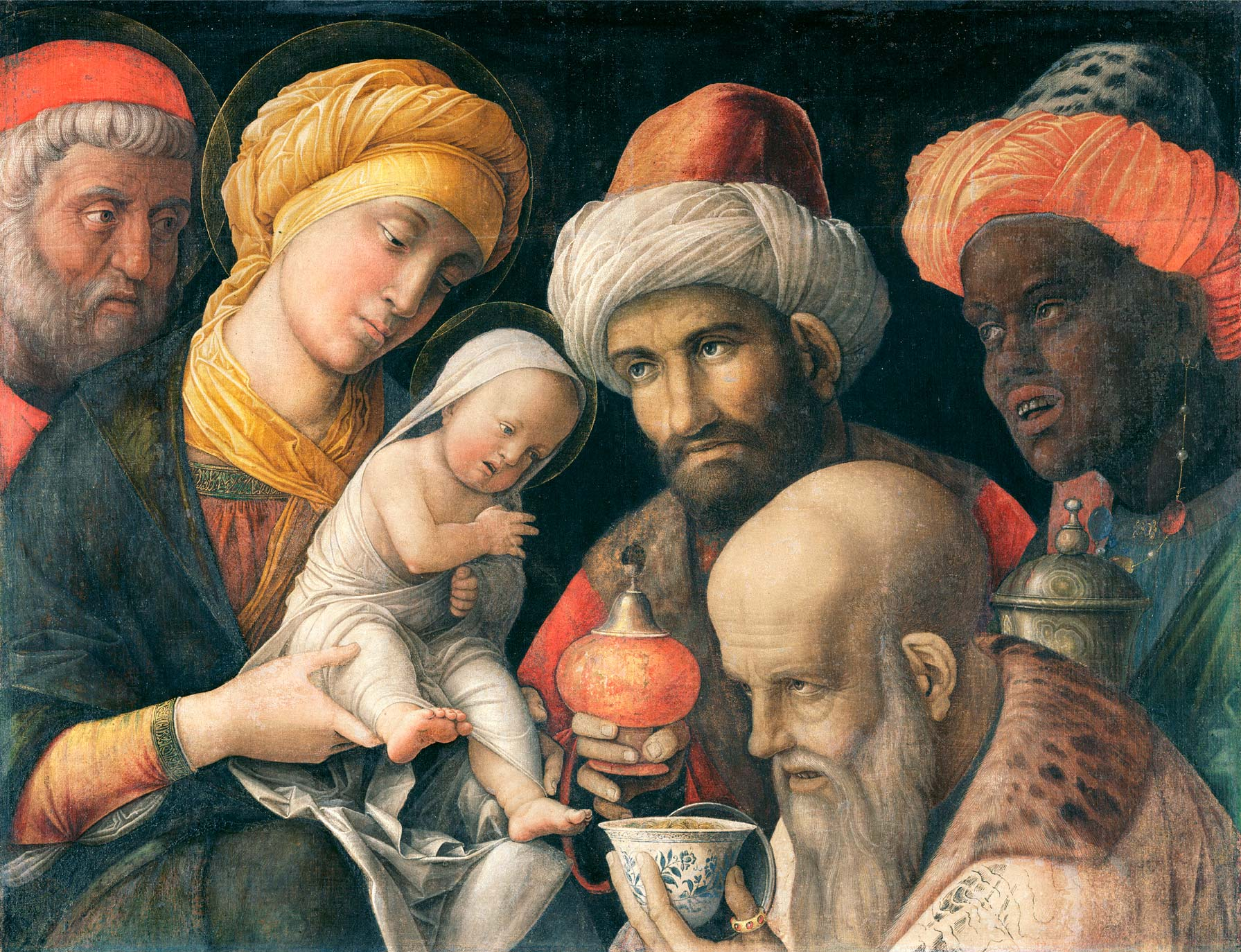
Andrea Mantegna Adoration of the Magi, 1495

Circle of Raphael Portrait of a Young Man in Red, 1505

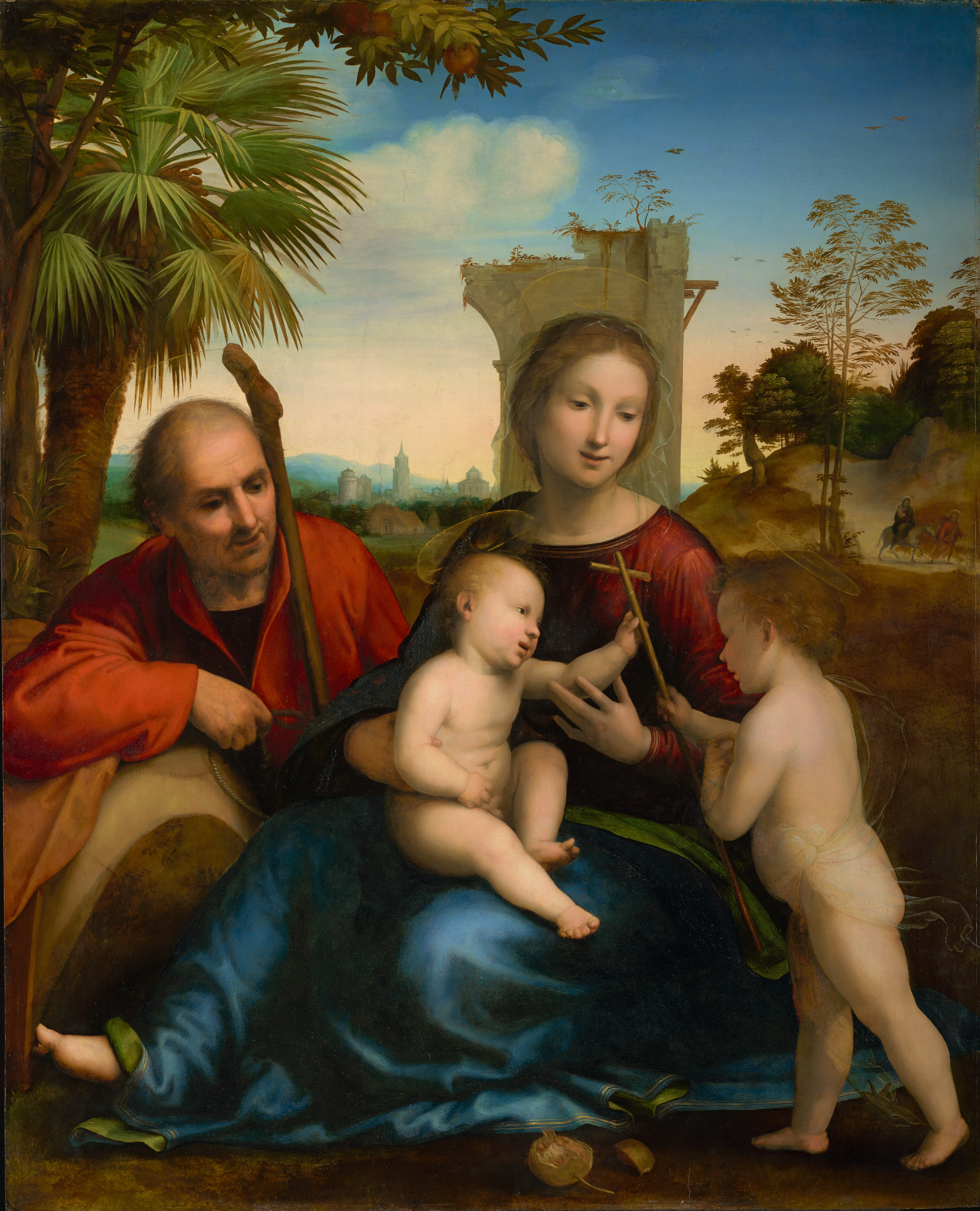
Fra Bartolomeo The Rest on the Flight into Egypt with Saint John the Baptist, 1509

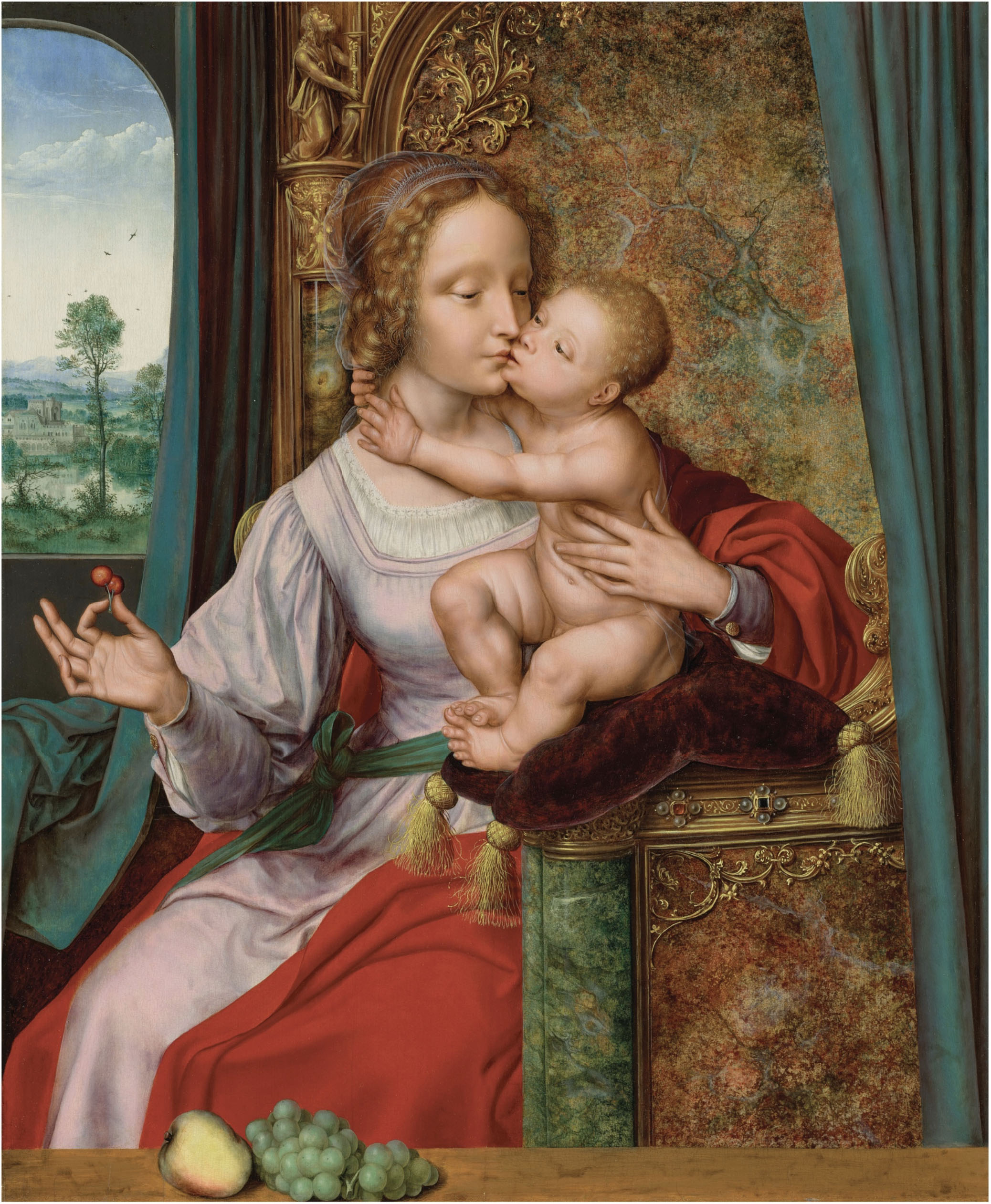
Quentin Matsys Madonna of the Cherries, 1520

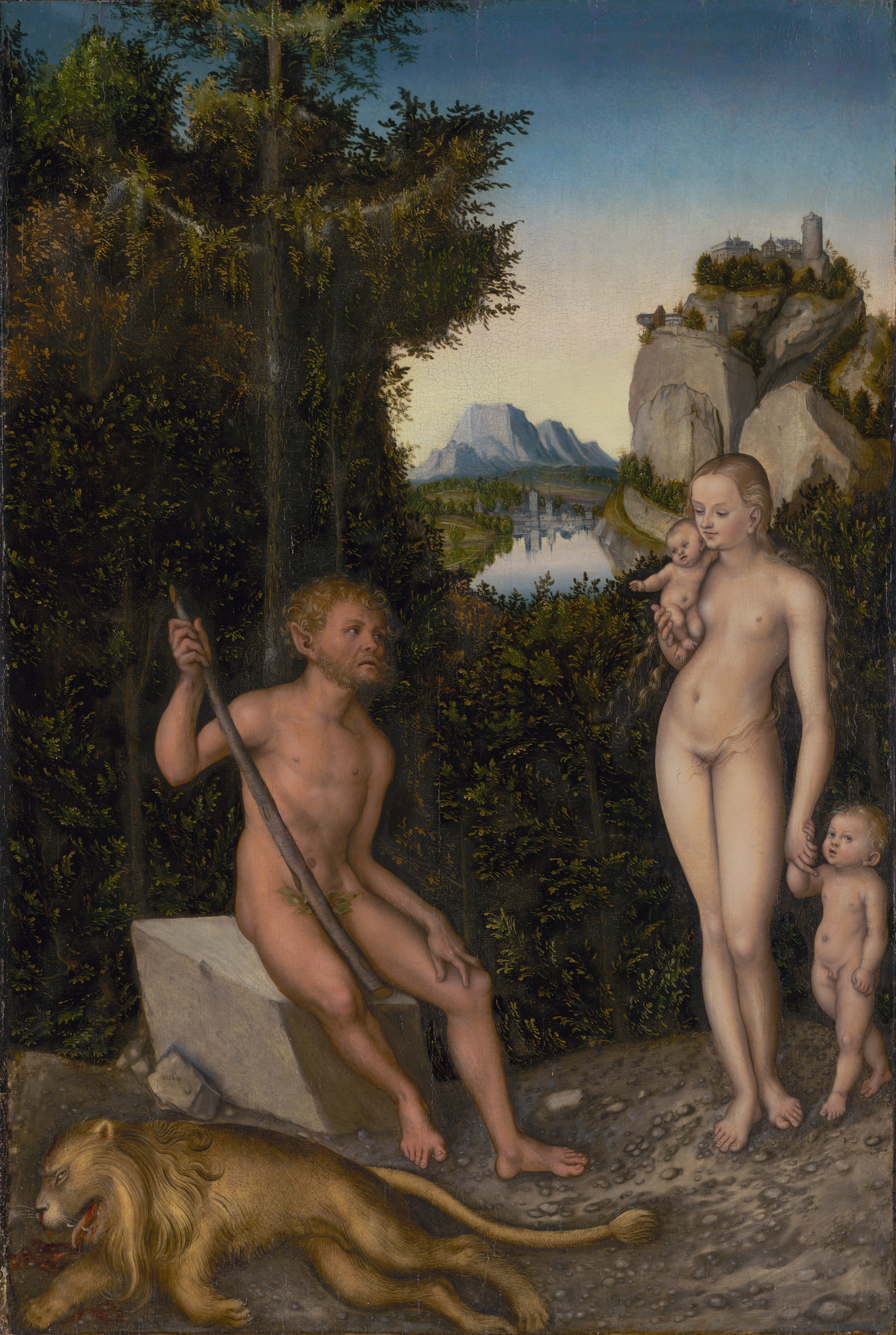
Lucas Cranach the Elder A Faun and His Family with a Slain Lion, 1522

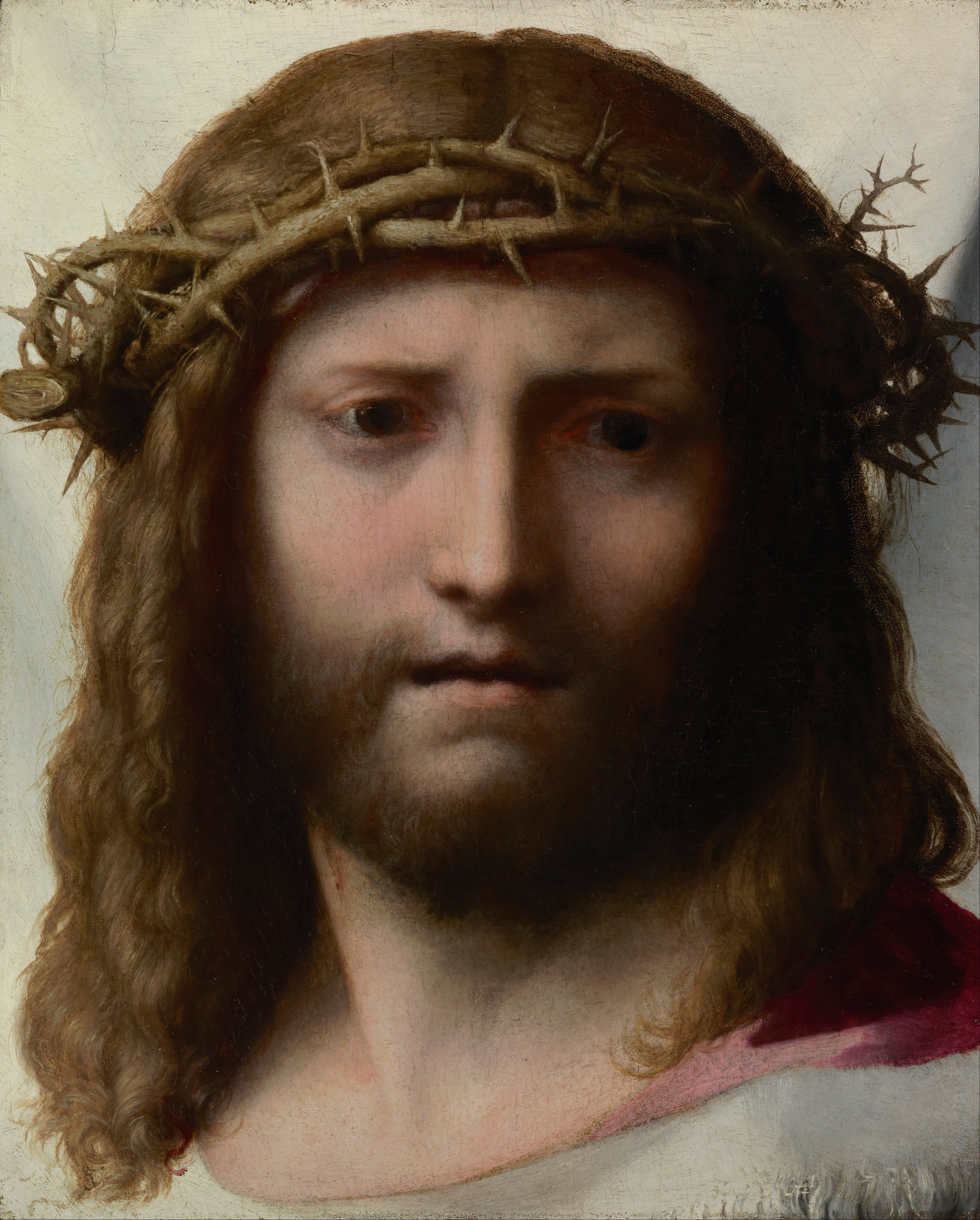
Correggio Head of Christ, 1525-1530

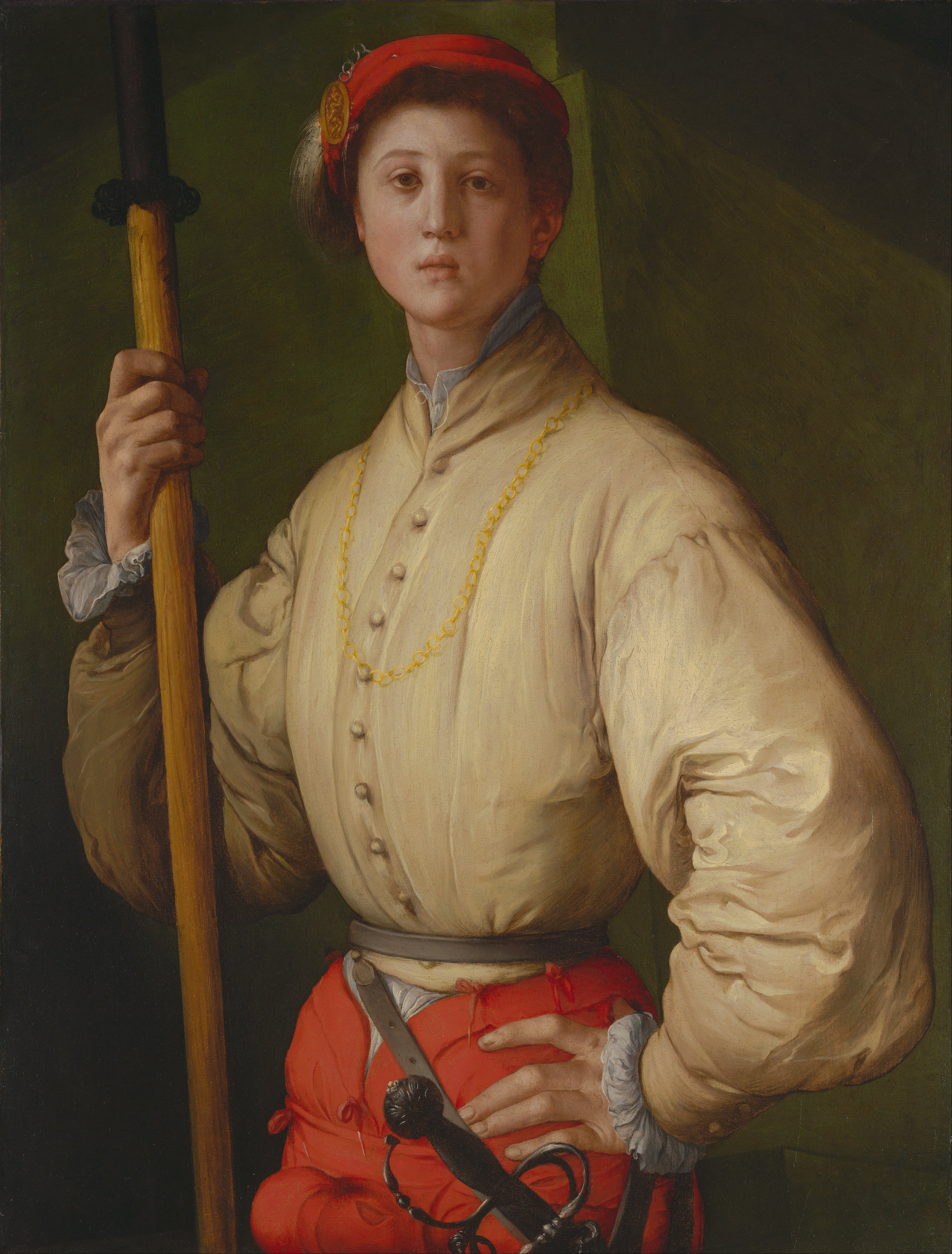
Pontormo, Portrait of a Halberdier, 1528

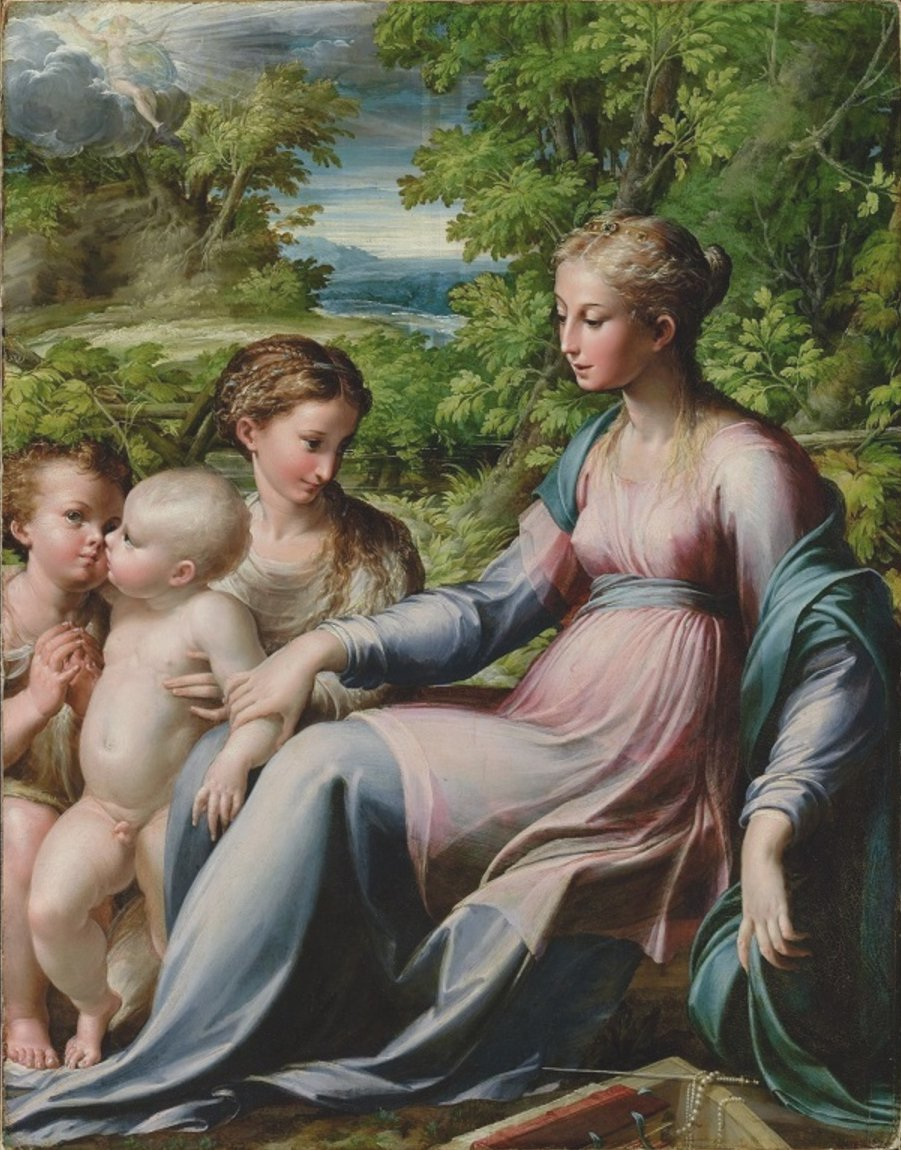
Parmigianino, Virgin with Child, St. John the Baptist, and Mary Magdalene, about 1530

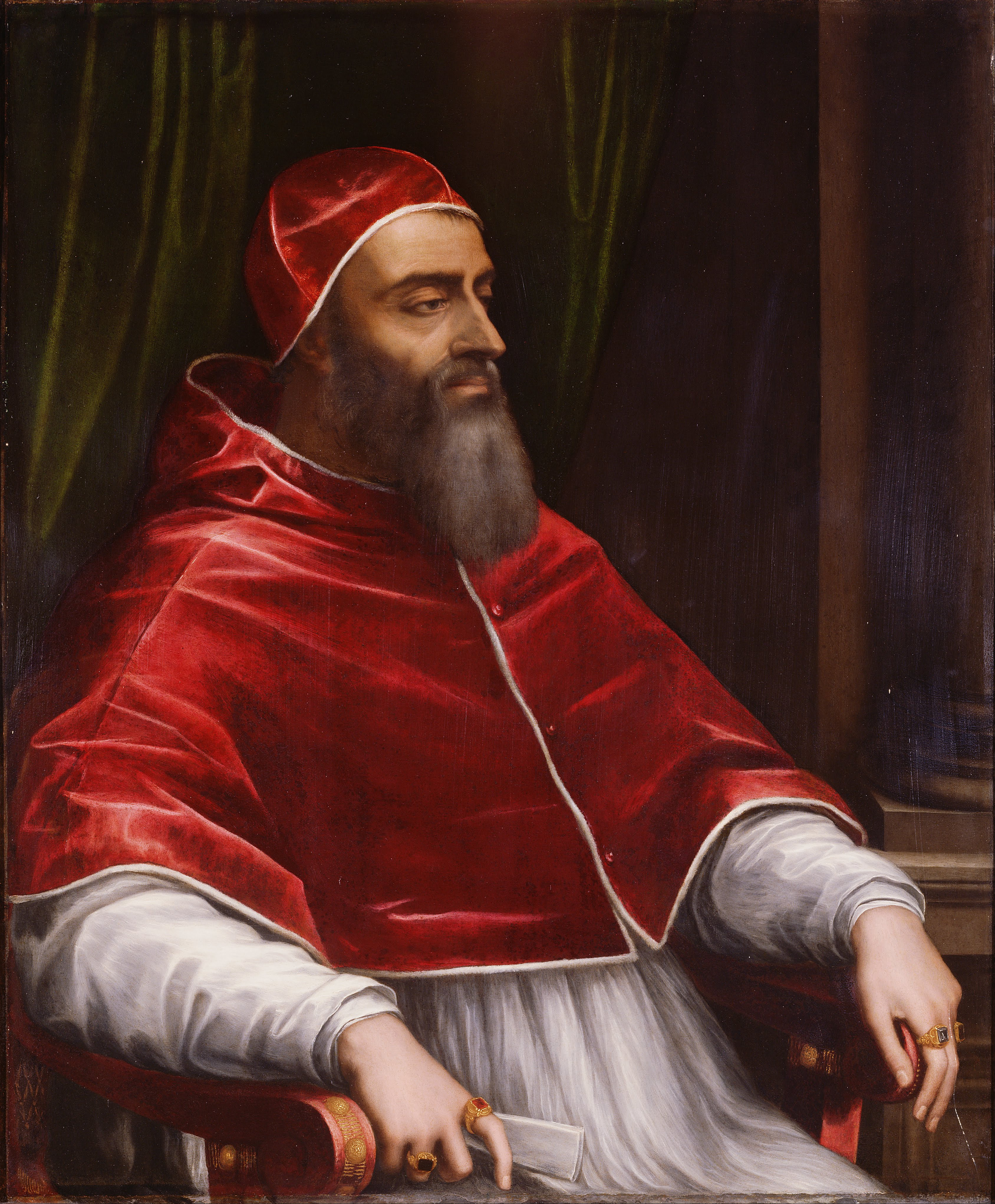
Sebastiano del Piombo Pope Clement VII, 1531

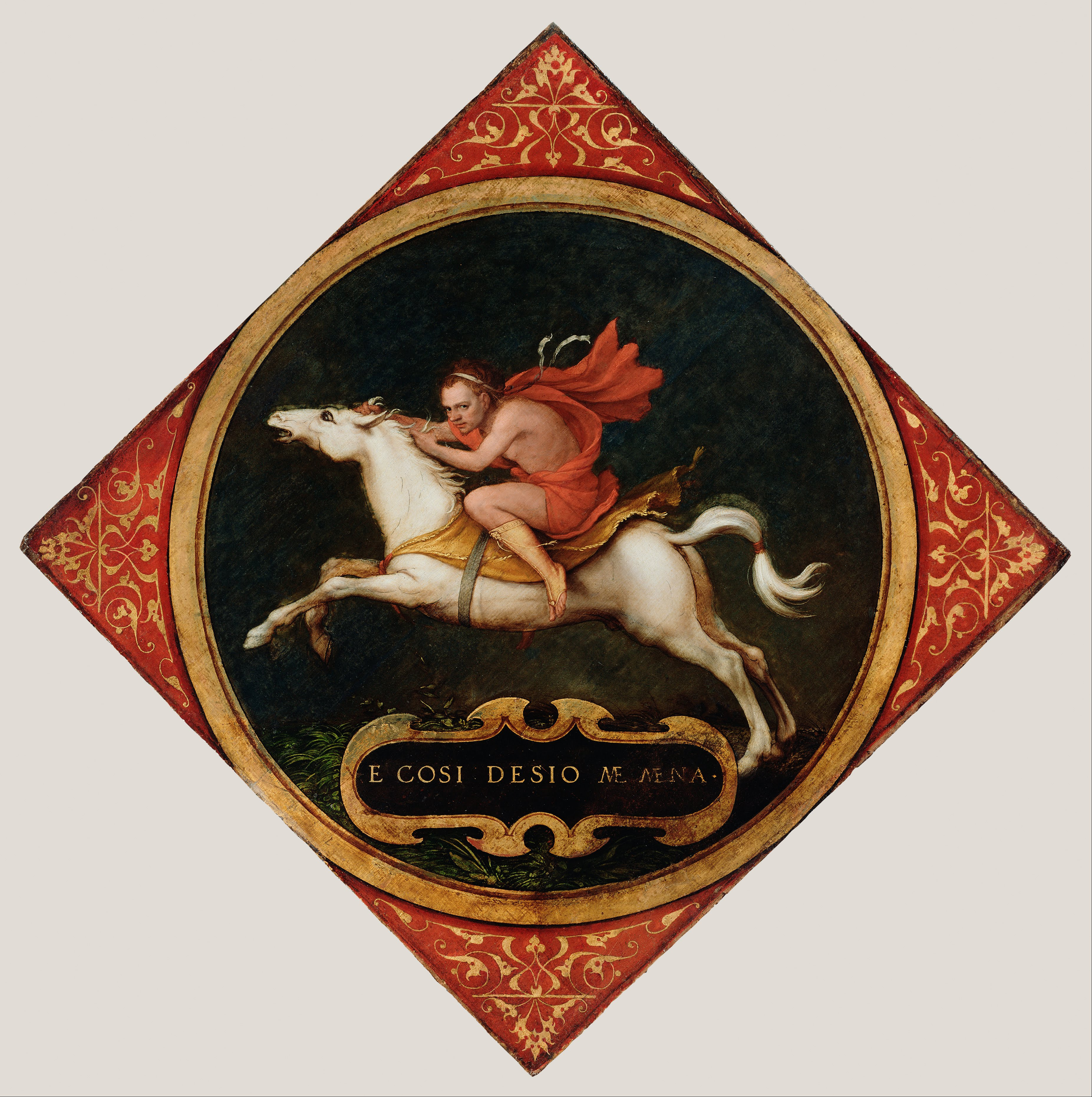
Hans Holbein the Younger An Allegory of Passion, 1532

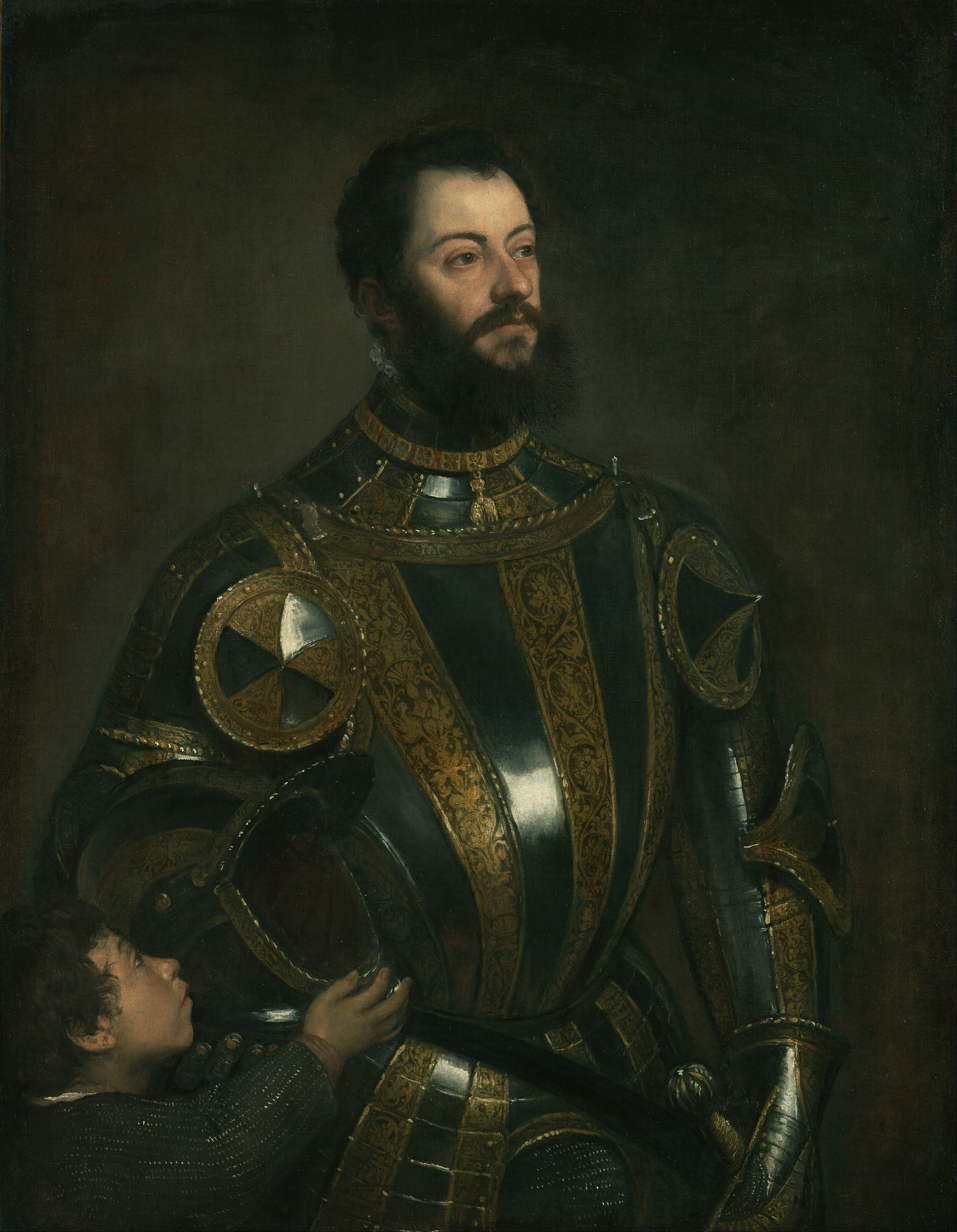
Titian, Portrait of Alfonso d'Avalos, Marchese del Vasto, 1533

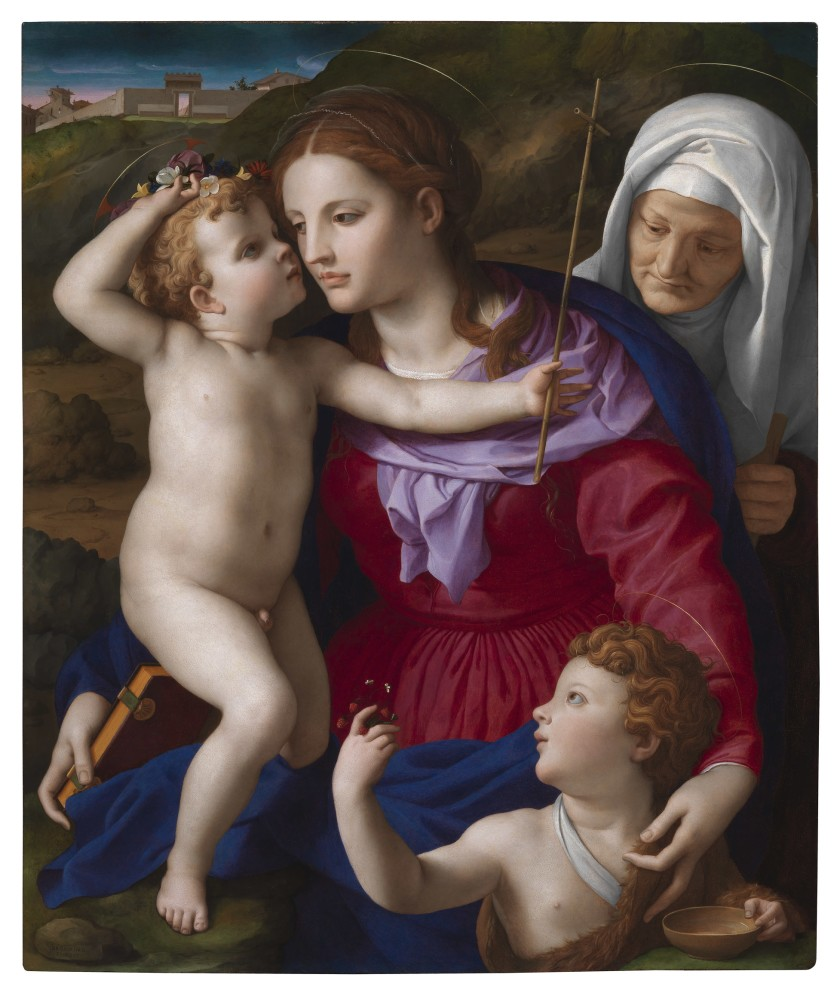
Bronzino, Virgin and Child with Saint Elizabeth and Saint John the Baptist, 1540-1545

Paolo Veronese Portrait of a Man, 1576–1578

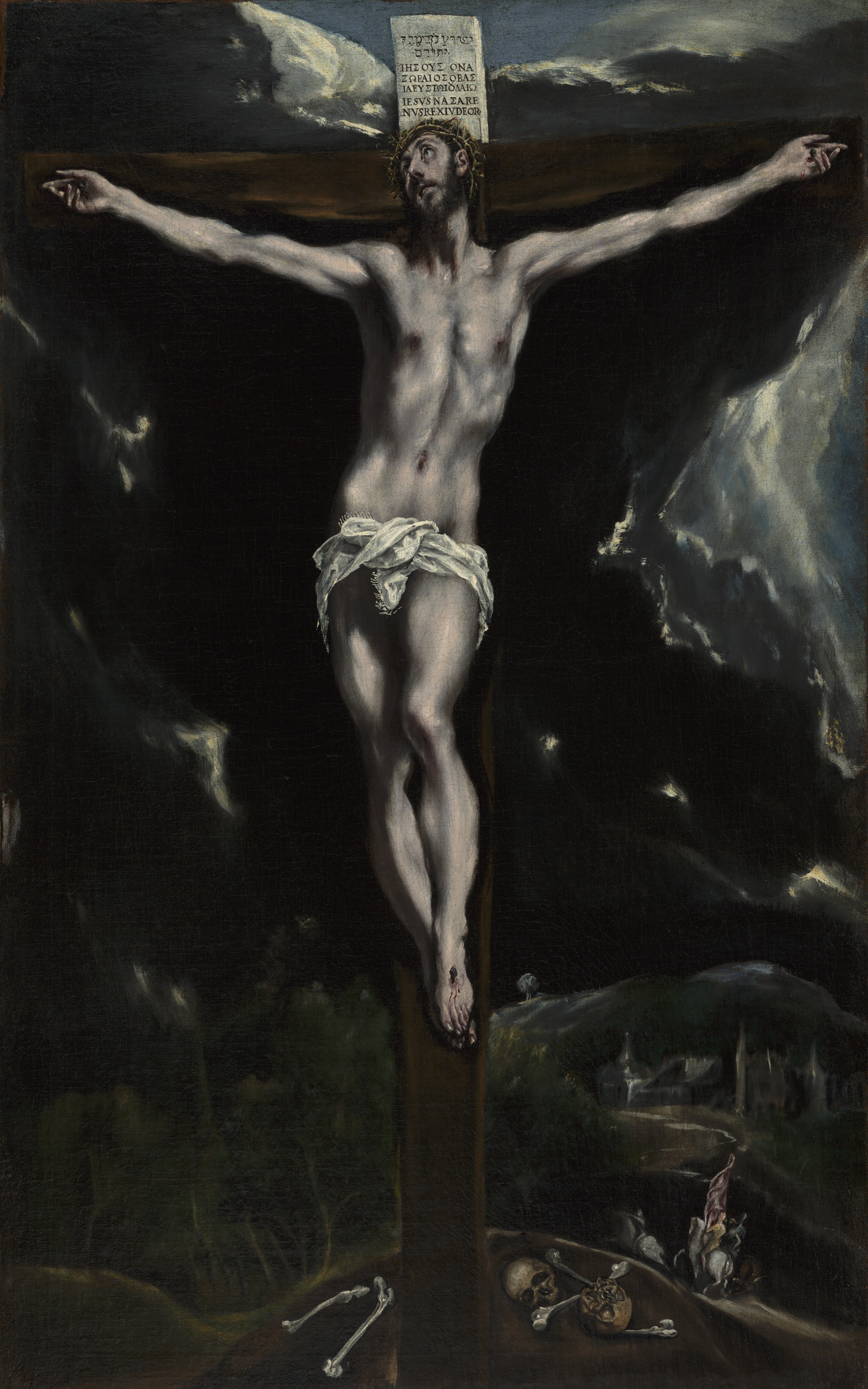
El Greco Christ on the Cross, 1610

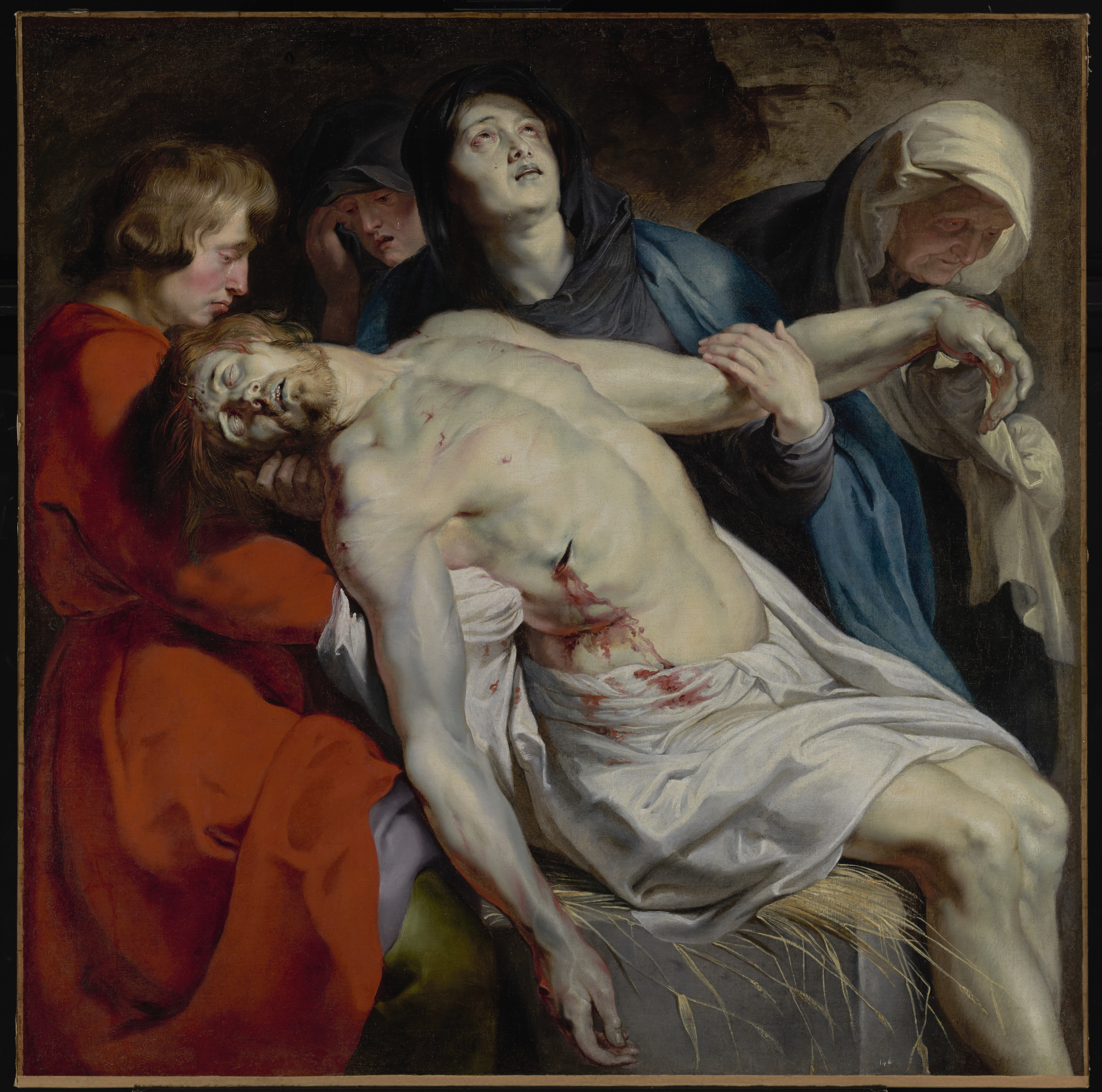
Peter Paul Rubens, The Entombment, 1612

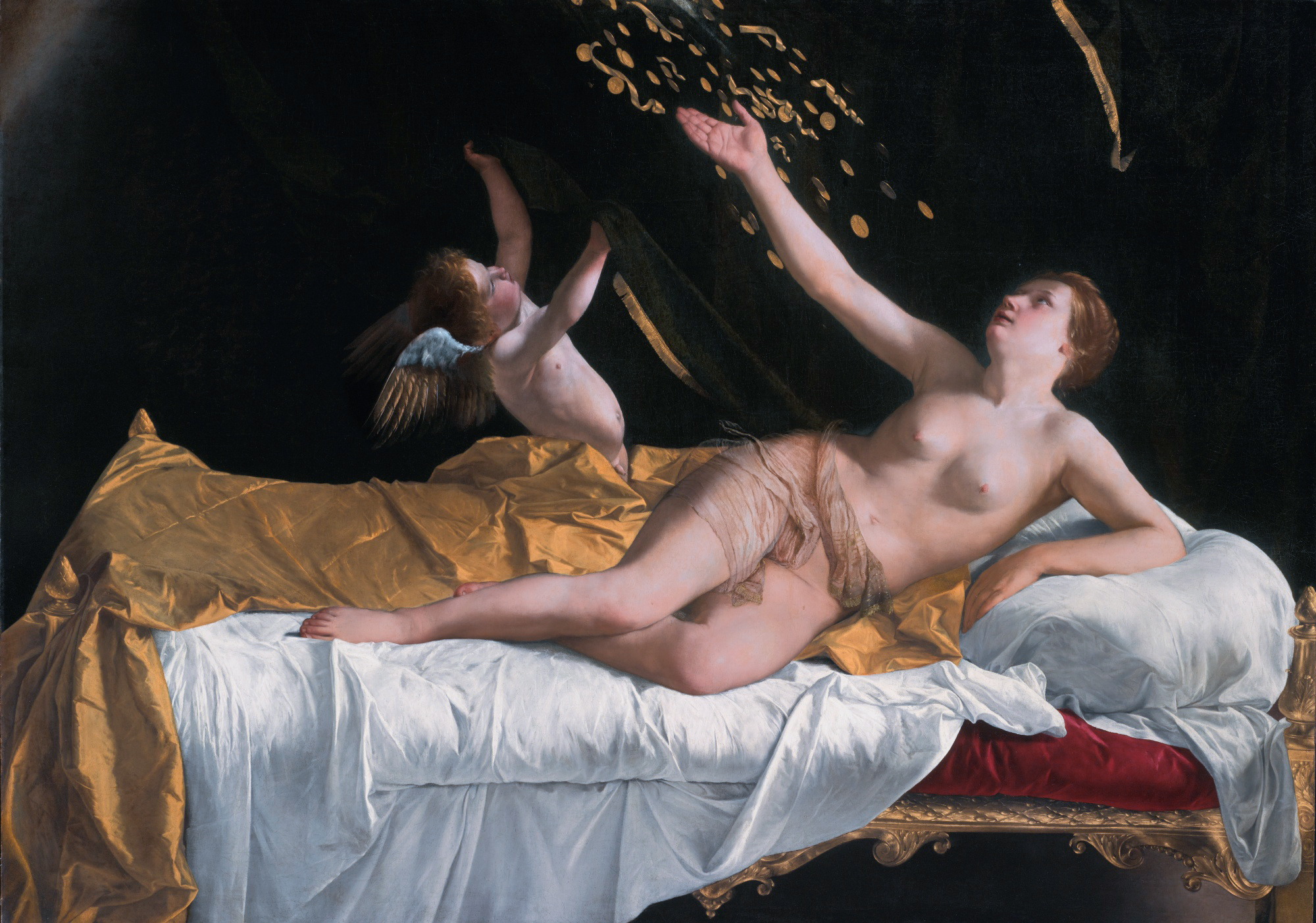
Orazio Gentileschi, Danaë, 1621

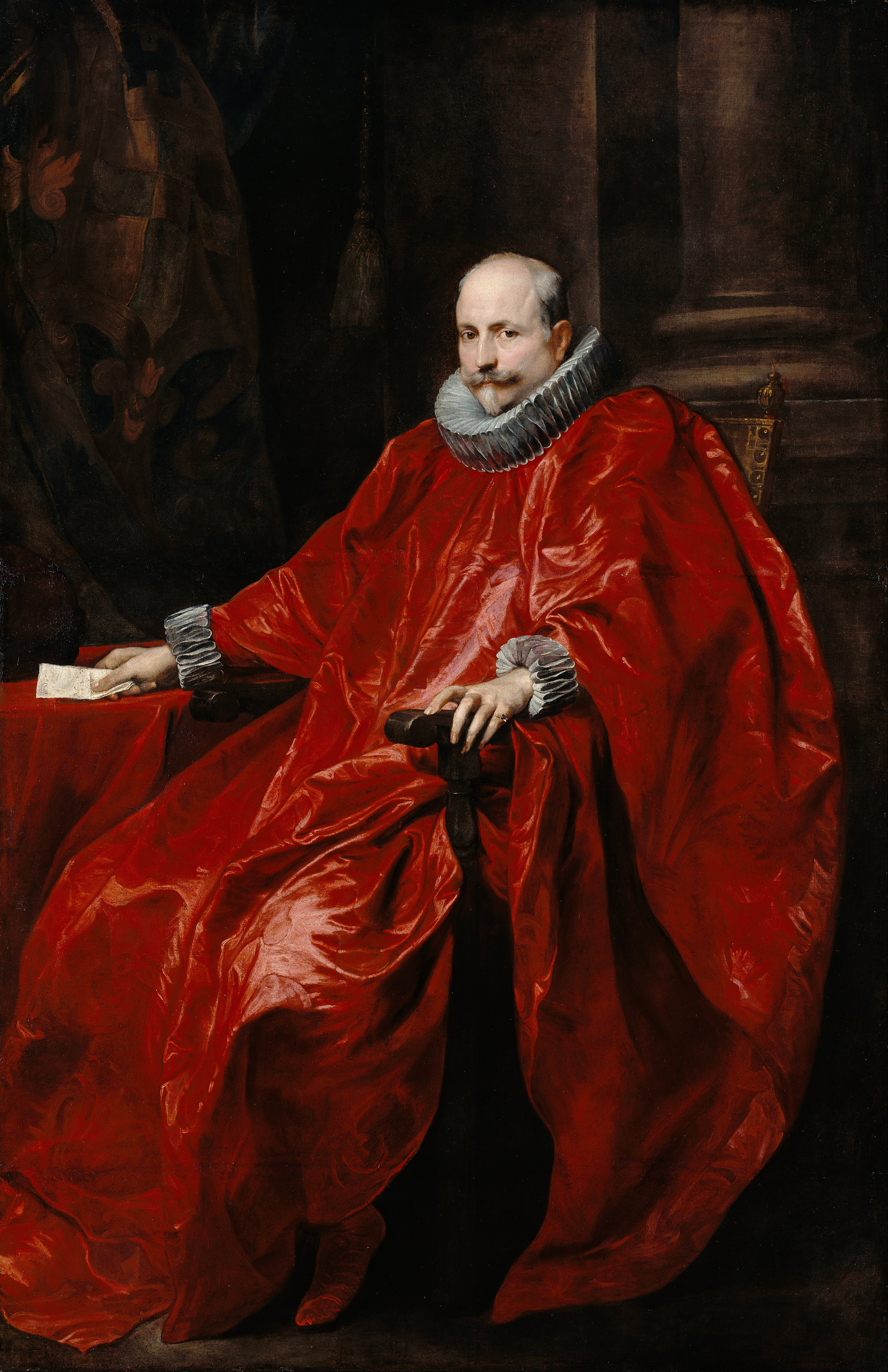
Anthony van Dyck Portrait of Agostino Pallavicini, 1621

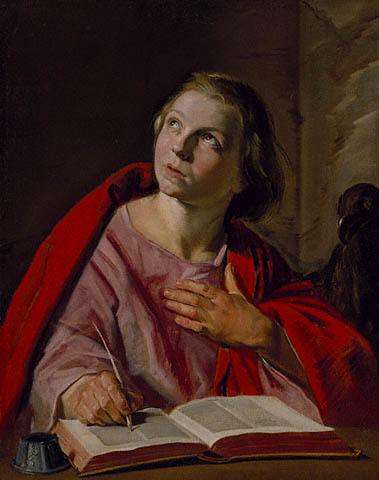
Frans Hals Saint John the Evangelist, 1625

Diego Velázquez Gaspar de Guzmán y Pimentel, c.1623

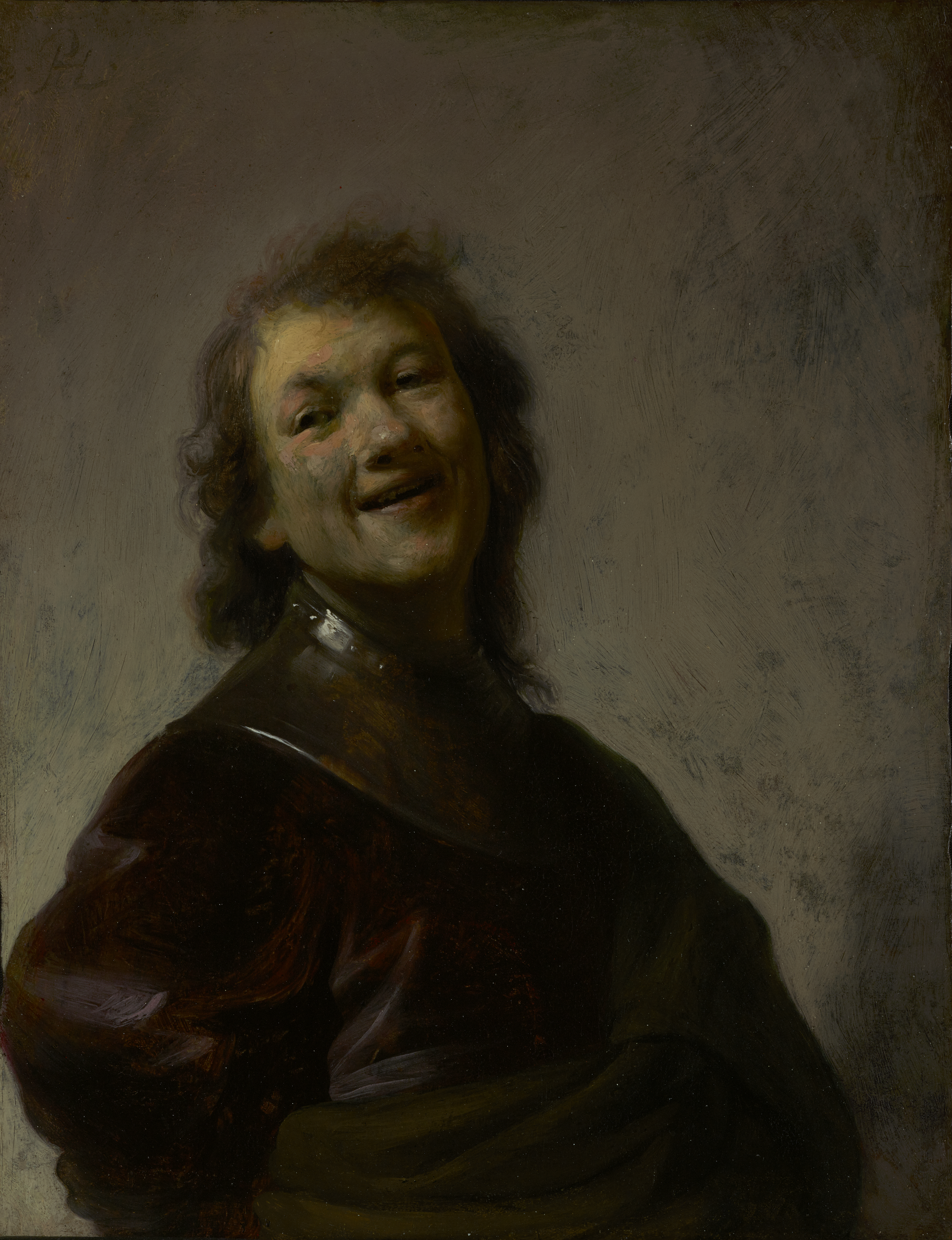
Rembrandt, Rembrandt Laughing, 1628

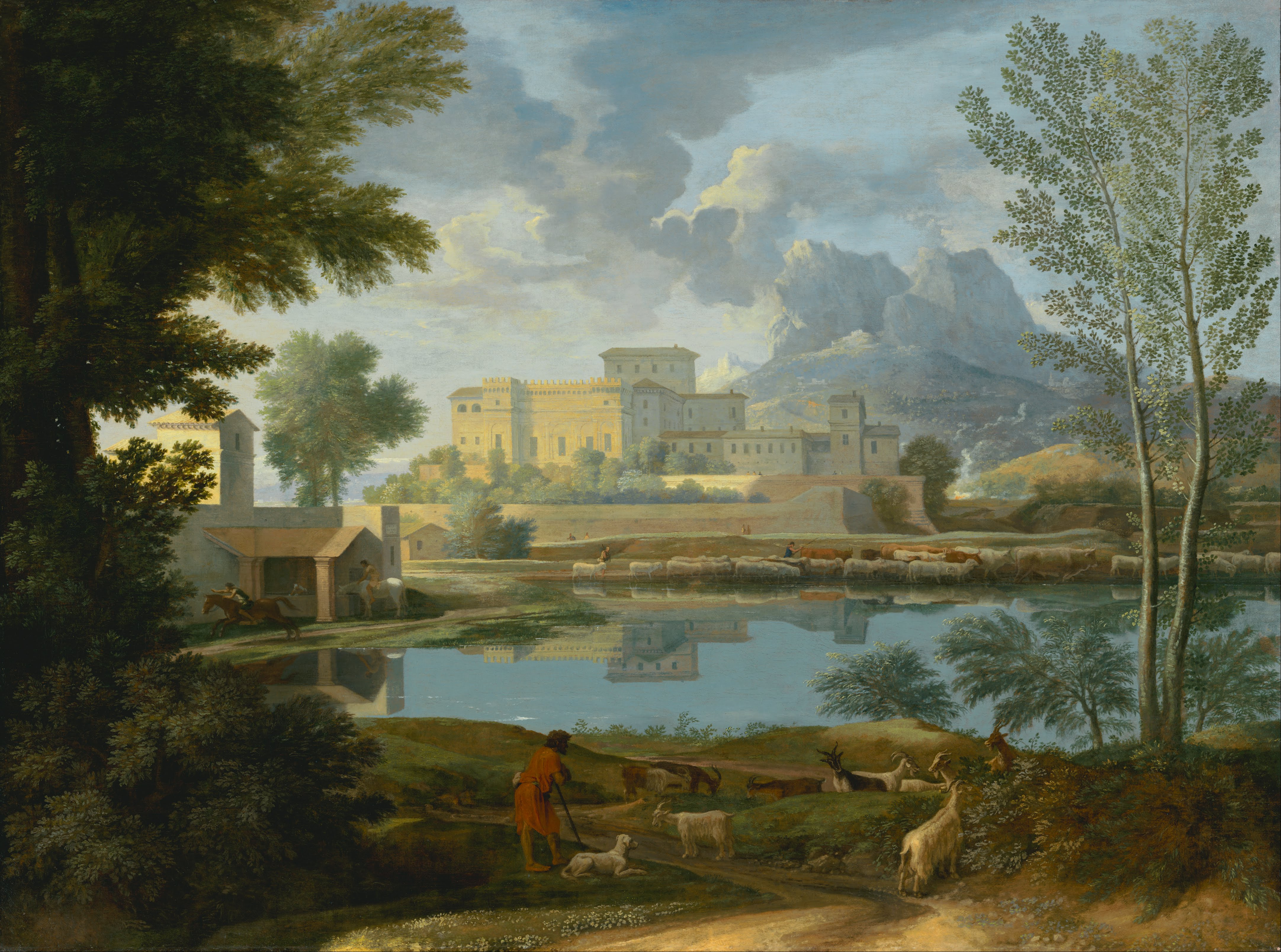
Nicolas Poussin, Landscape in Calm Weather, 1651

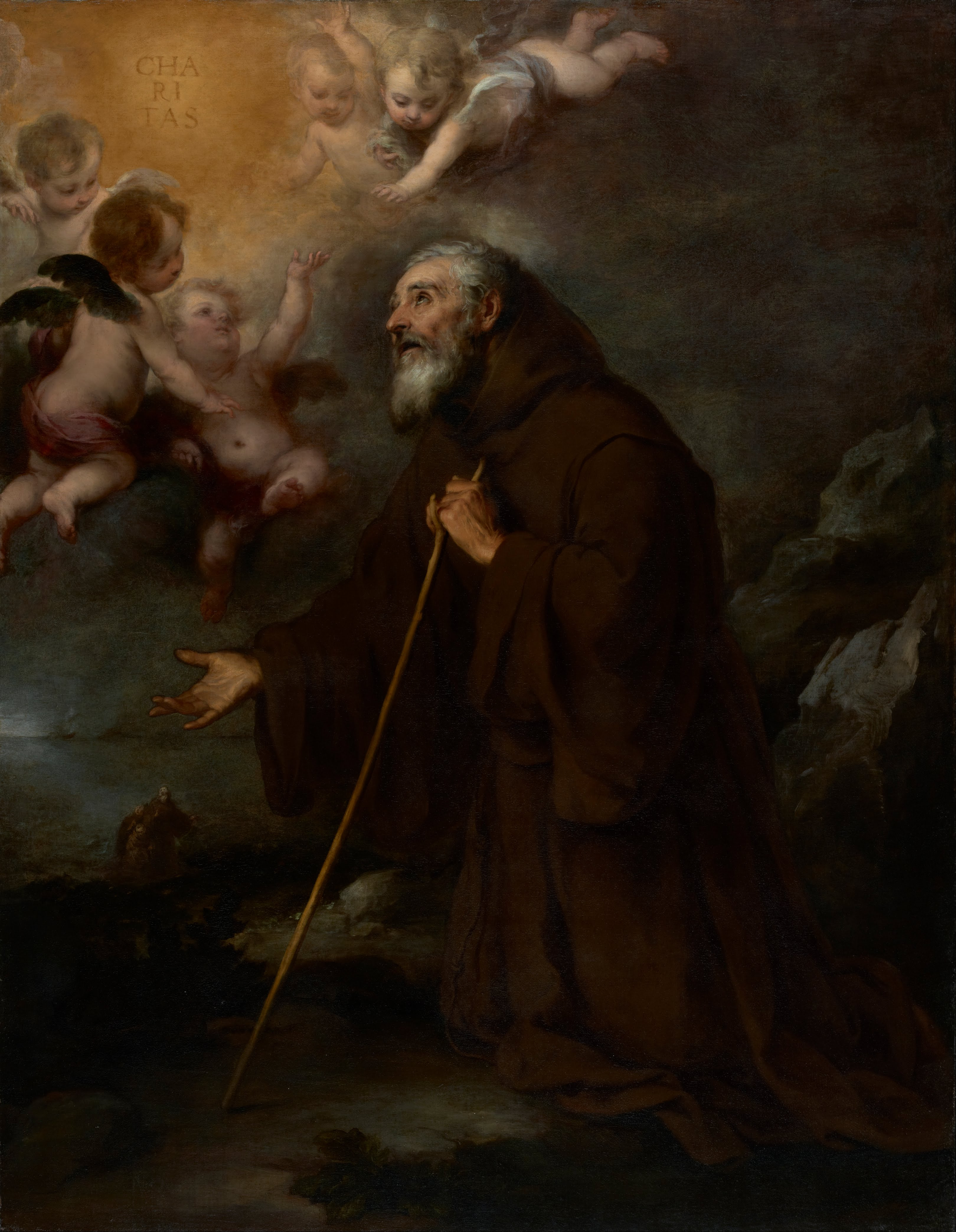
Bartolomé Esteban Murillo The Vision of Saint Francis of Paola, 1670

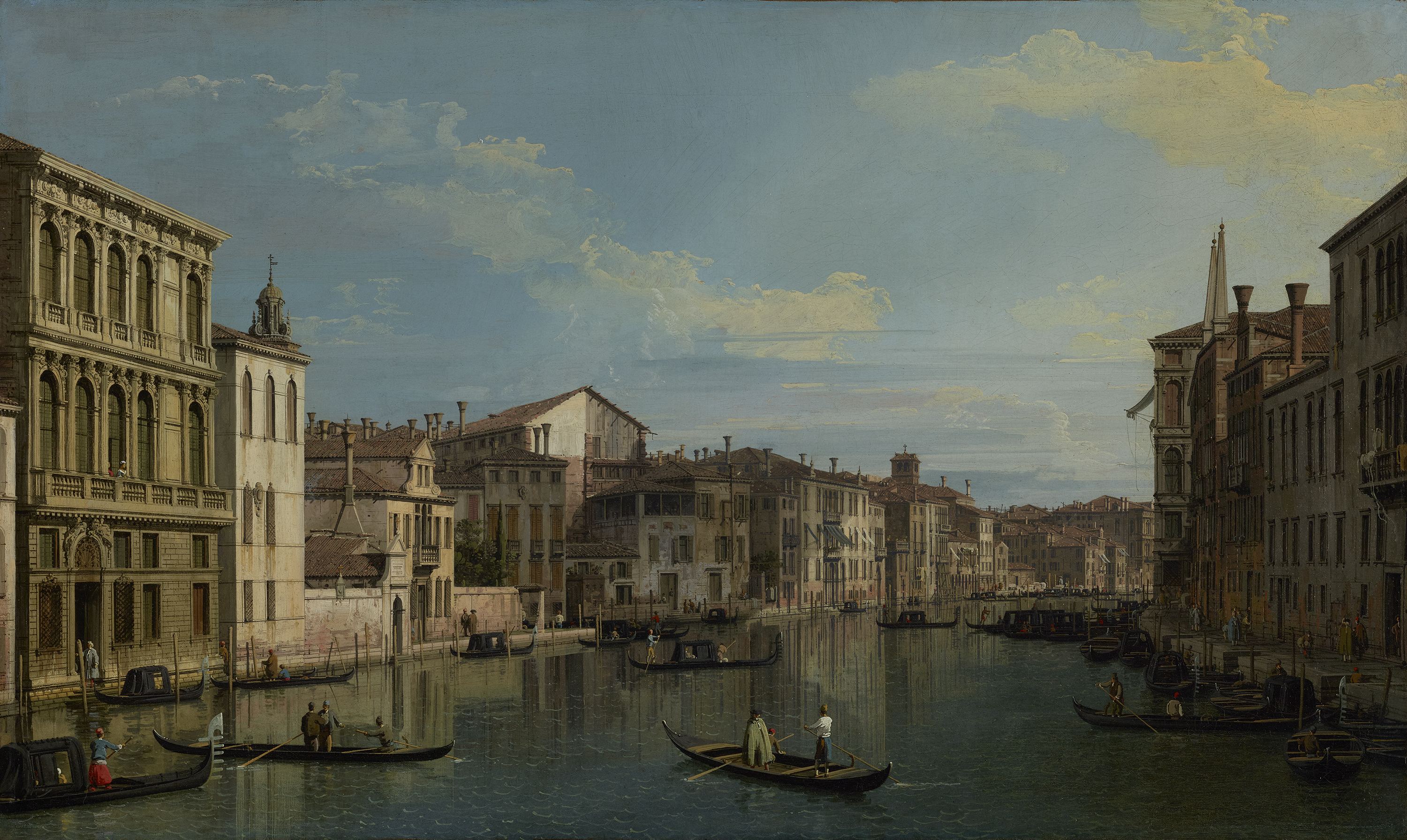
Canaletto, The Grand Canal in Venice from Palazzo Flangini to Campo San Marcuola, about 1738

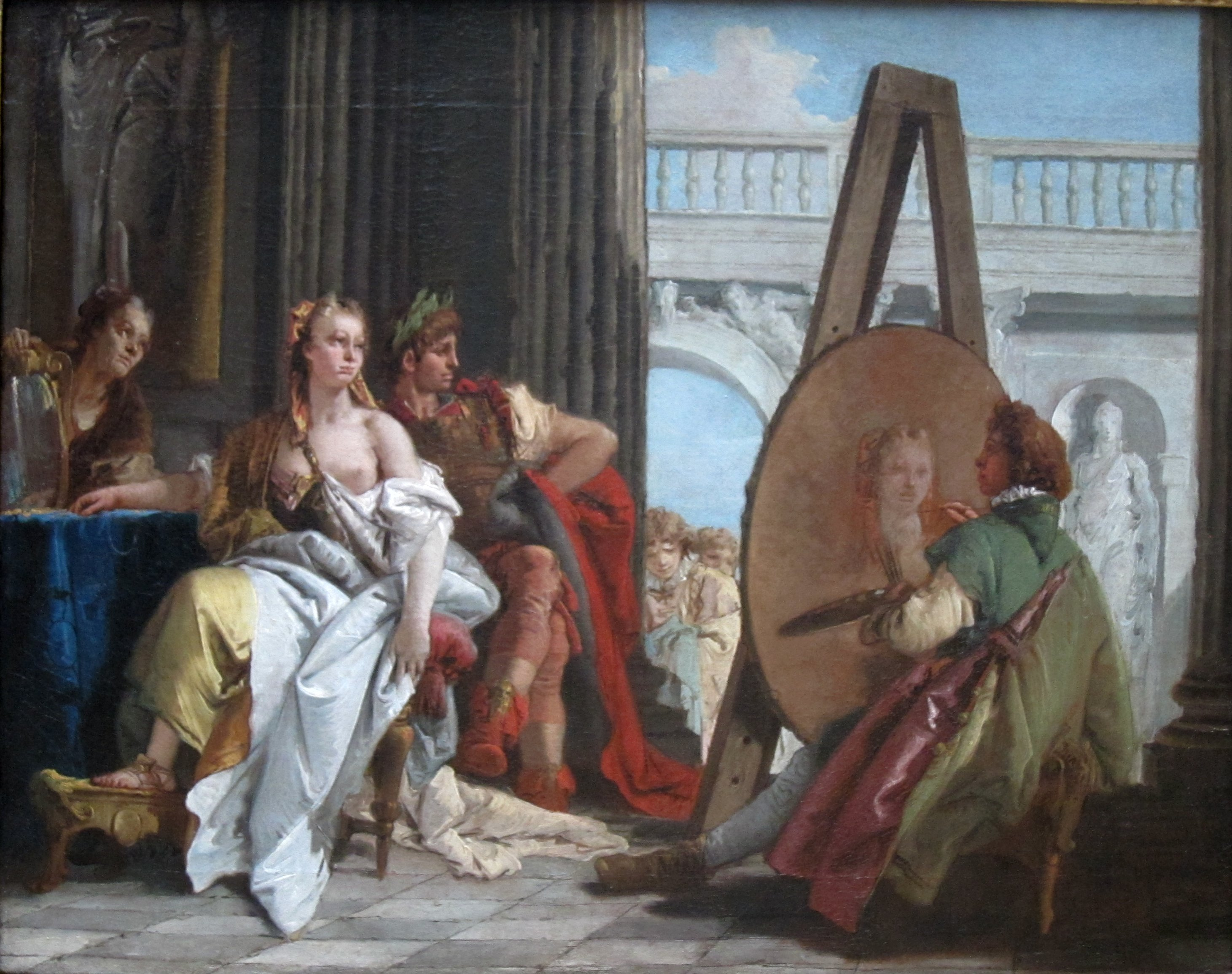
Tiepolo Alexander the Great and Campaspe in the Studio of Apelles, 1740

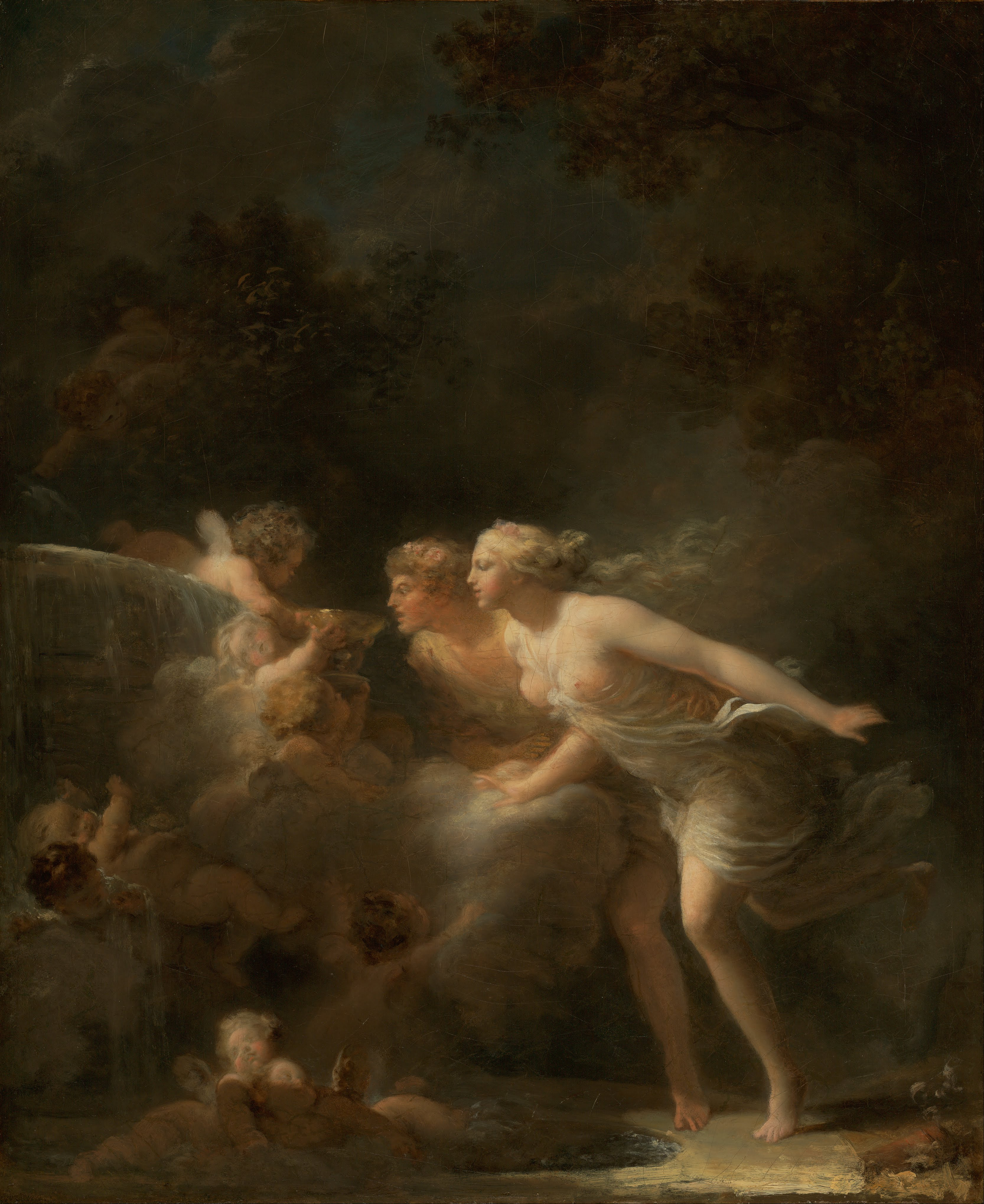
Jean-Honoré Fragonard The Fountain of Love, 1785

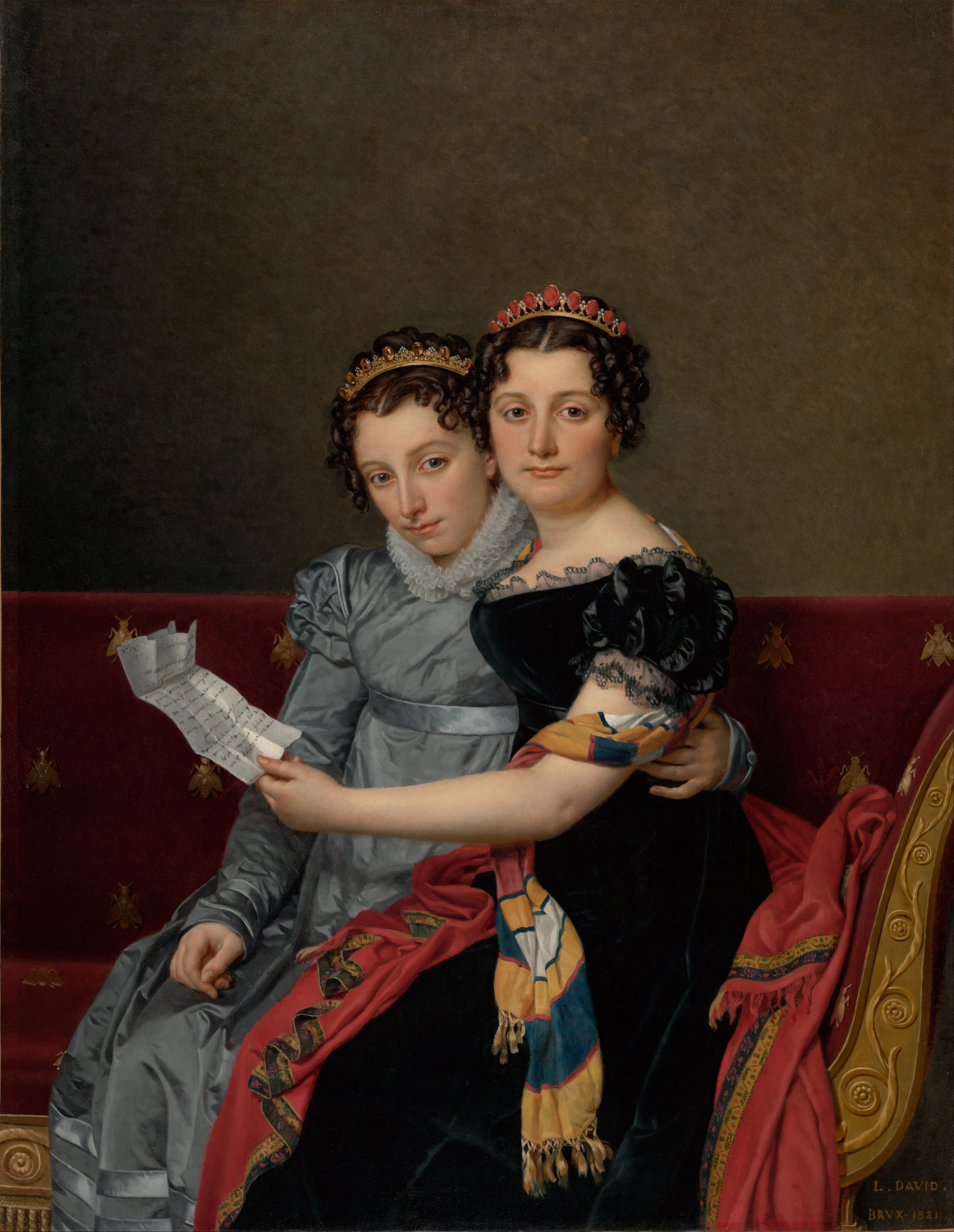
Jacques-Louis David, The Sisters Zénaïde and Charlotte Bonaparte, 1821

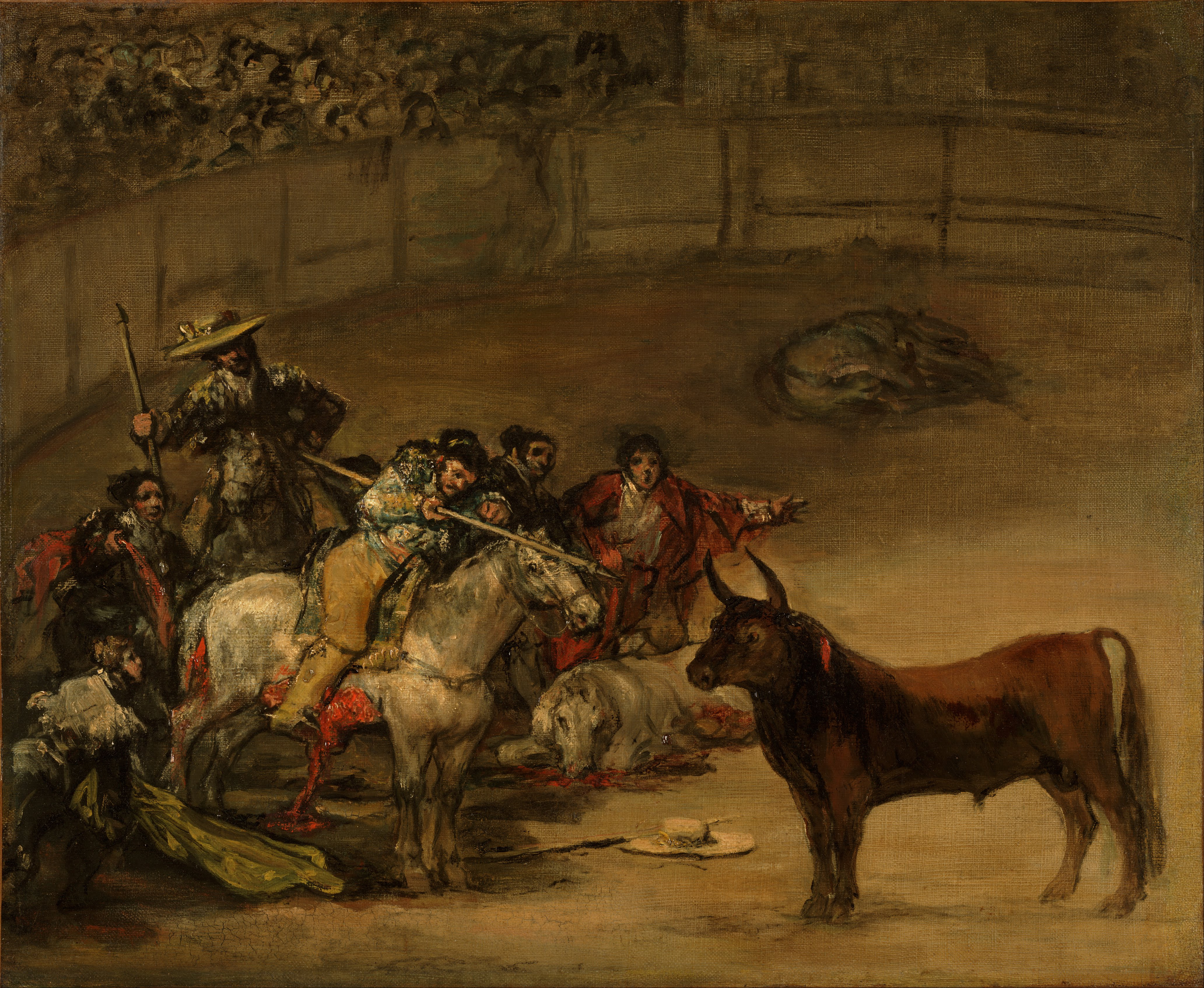
Francisco de Goya, Bullfight, 1824

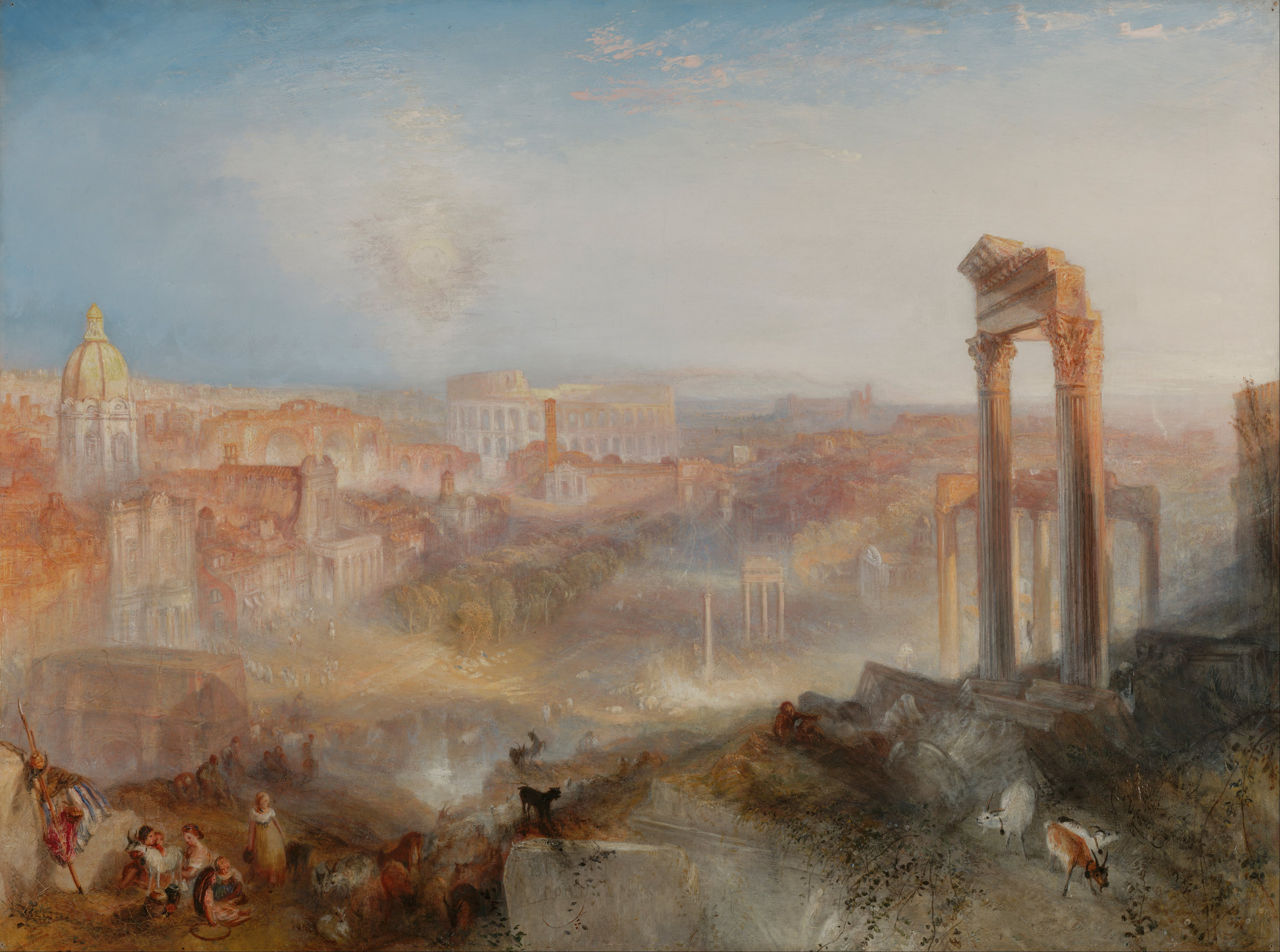
J. M. W. Turner, Modern Rome - Campo Vaccino, 1839

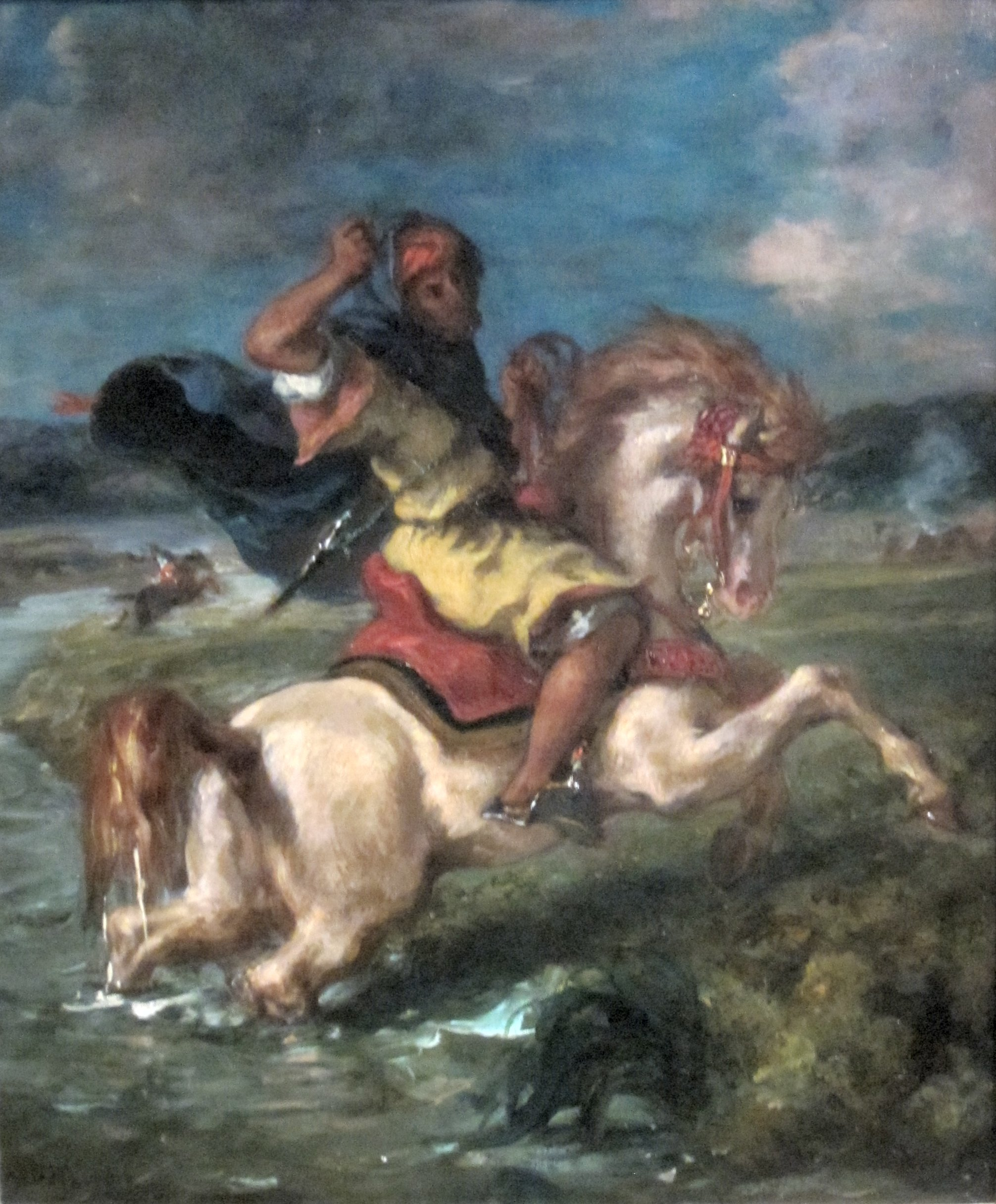
Eugène Delacroix Moroccan Horseman Crossing a Ford, 1850

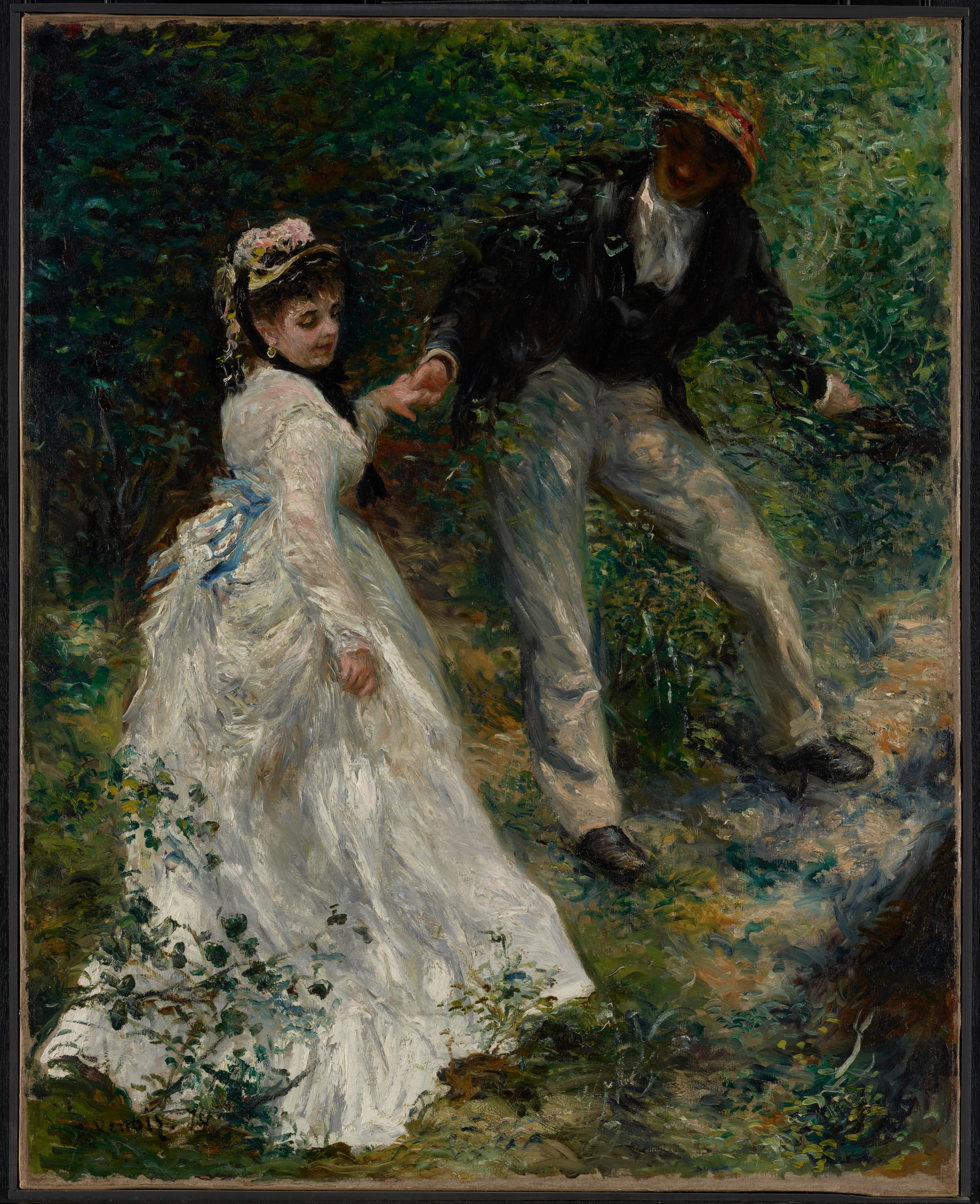
Pierre-Auguste Renoir, La Promenade, 1870

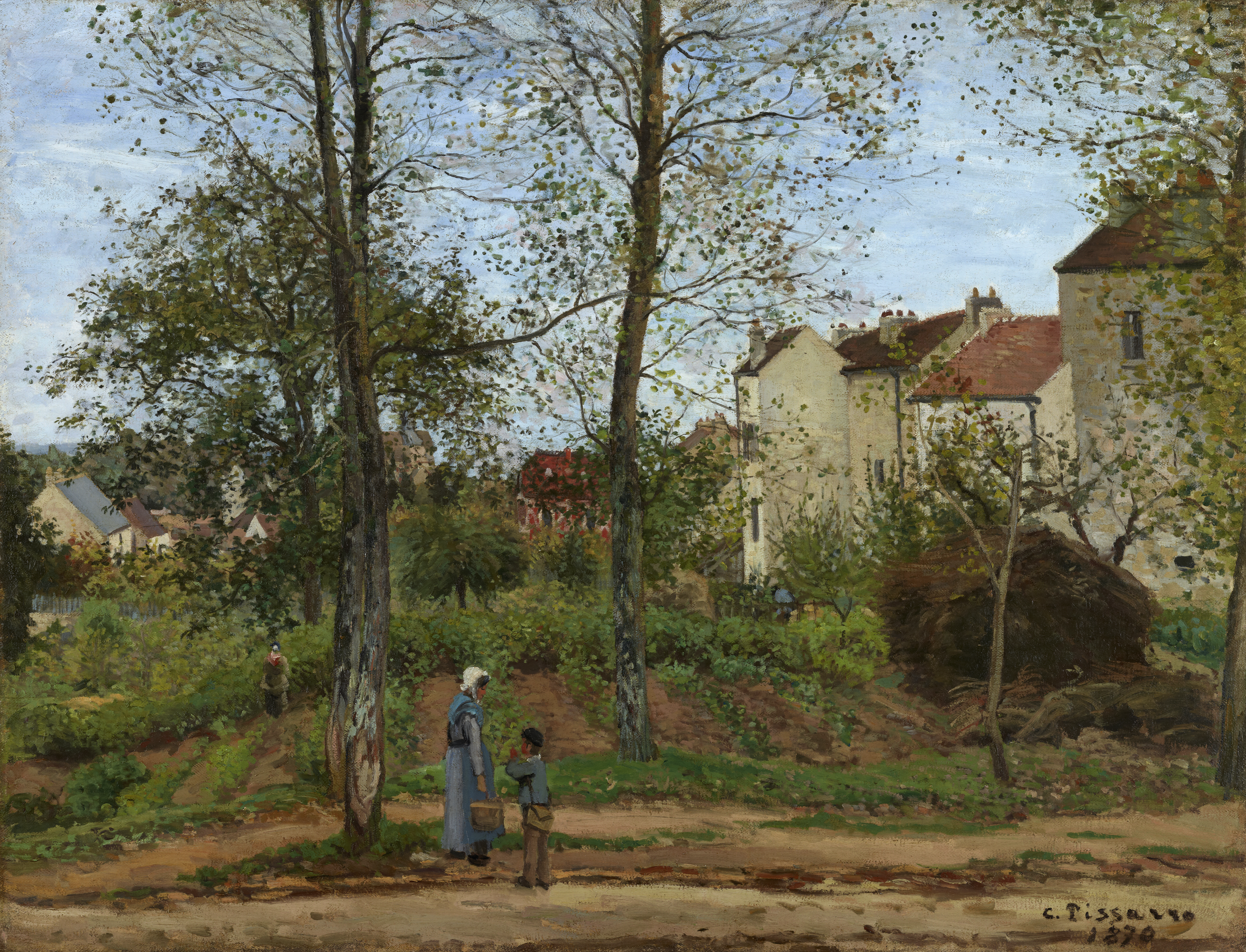
Camille Pissarro Landscape at Louveciennes (Autumn), 1870

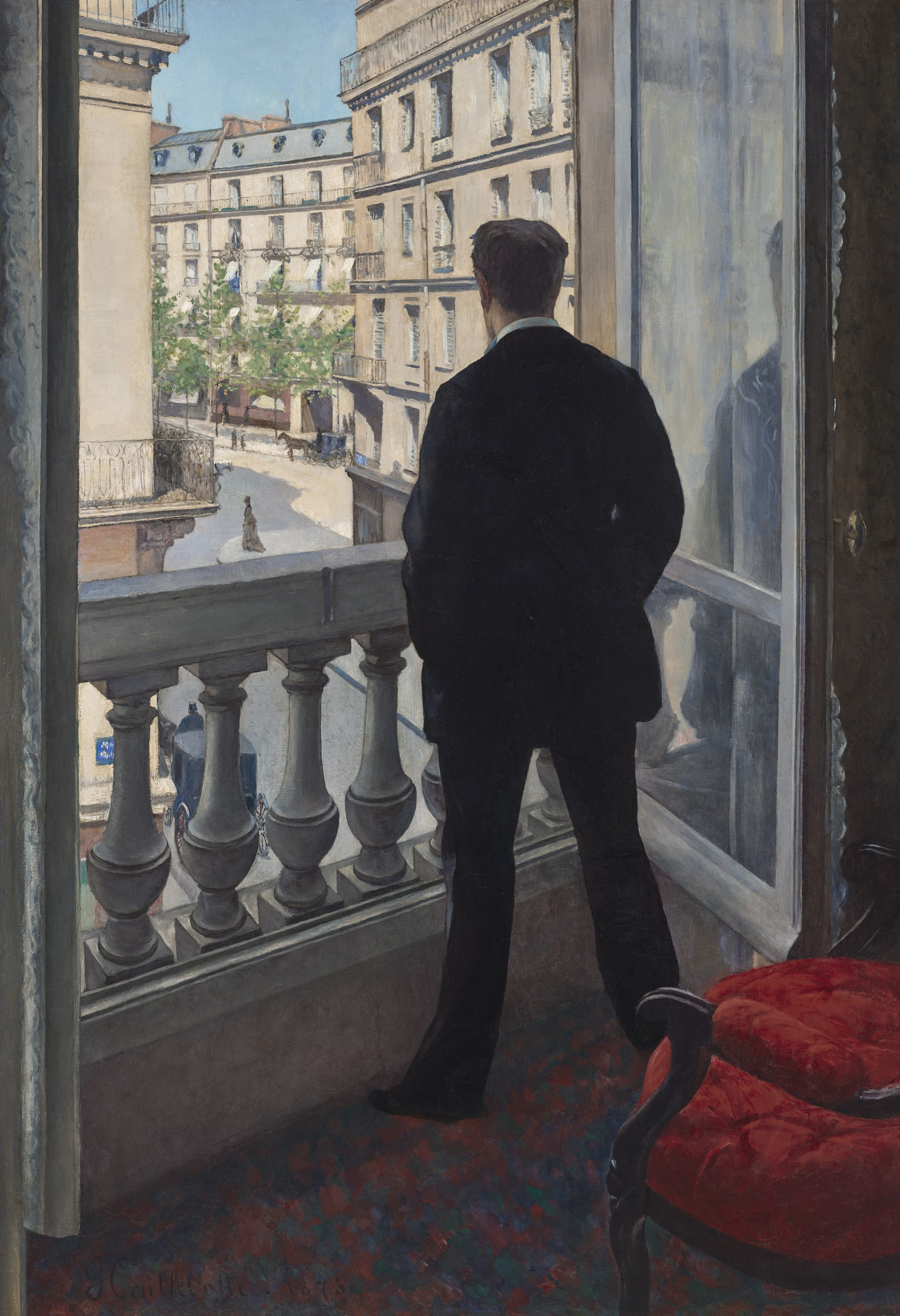
Gustave Caillebotte Young Man at His Window, 1876

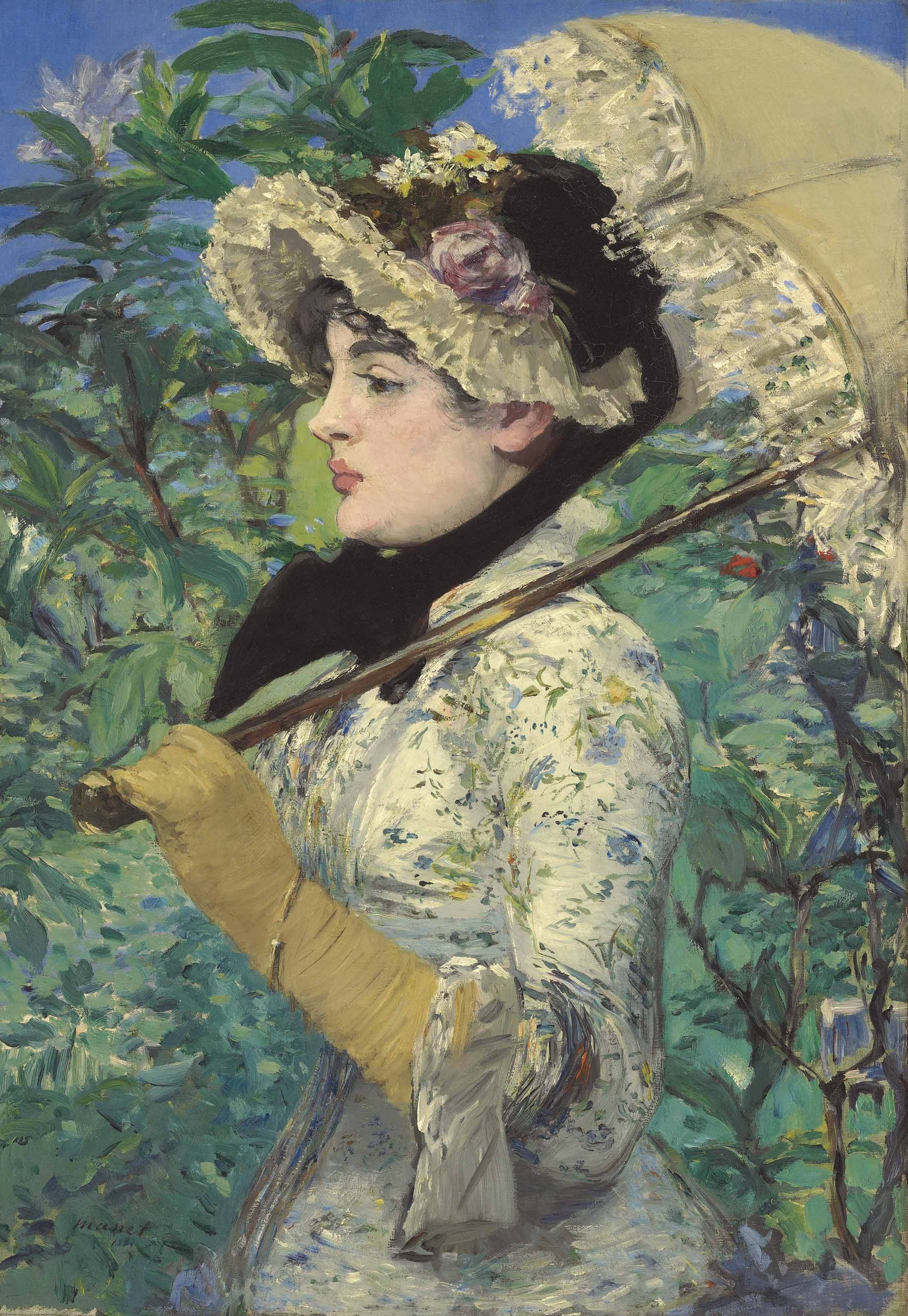
Édouard Manet, Spring, 1881

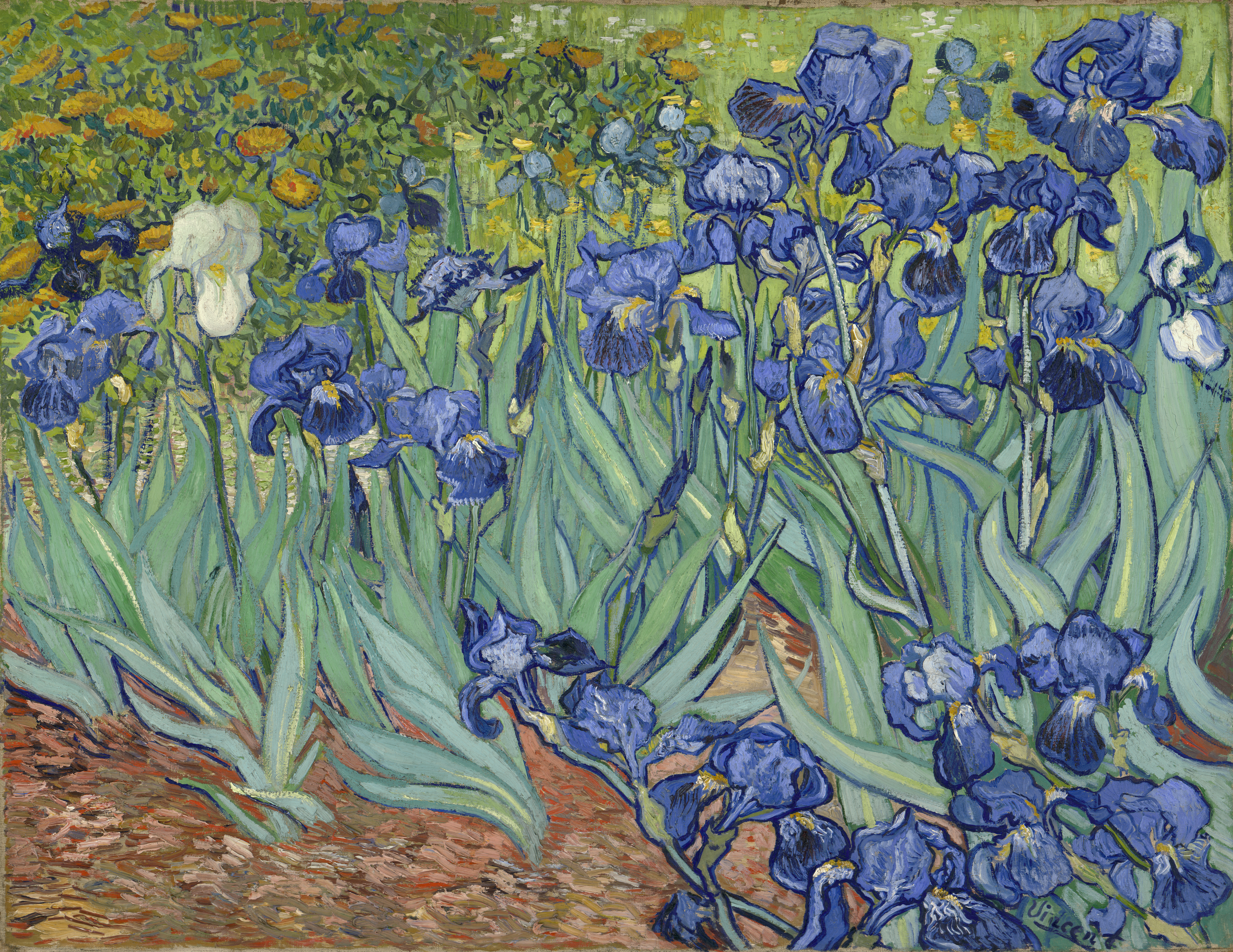
Vincent van Gogh, Irises, 1889

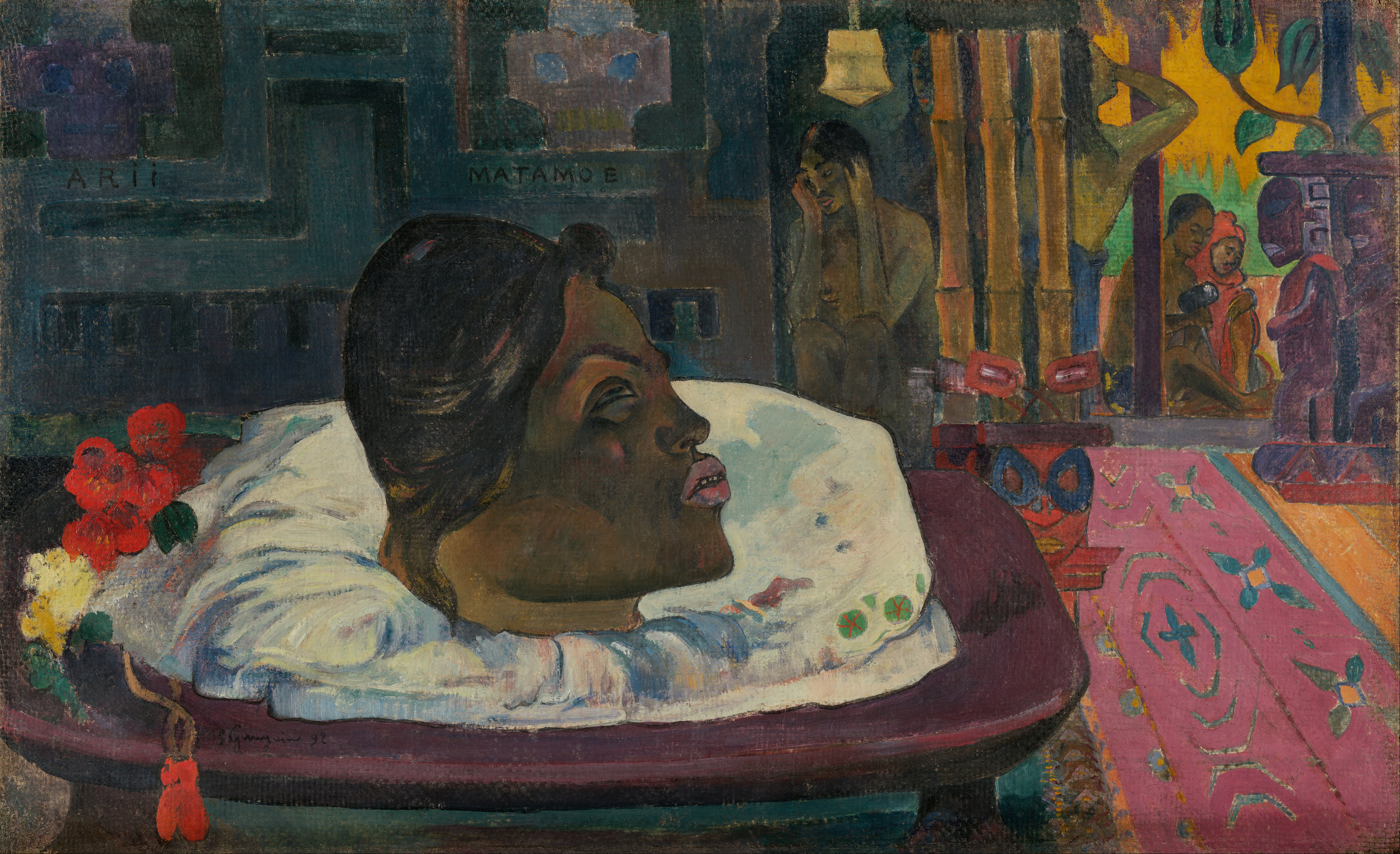
Paul Gauguin, Arii Matamoe (The Royal End), 1892

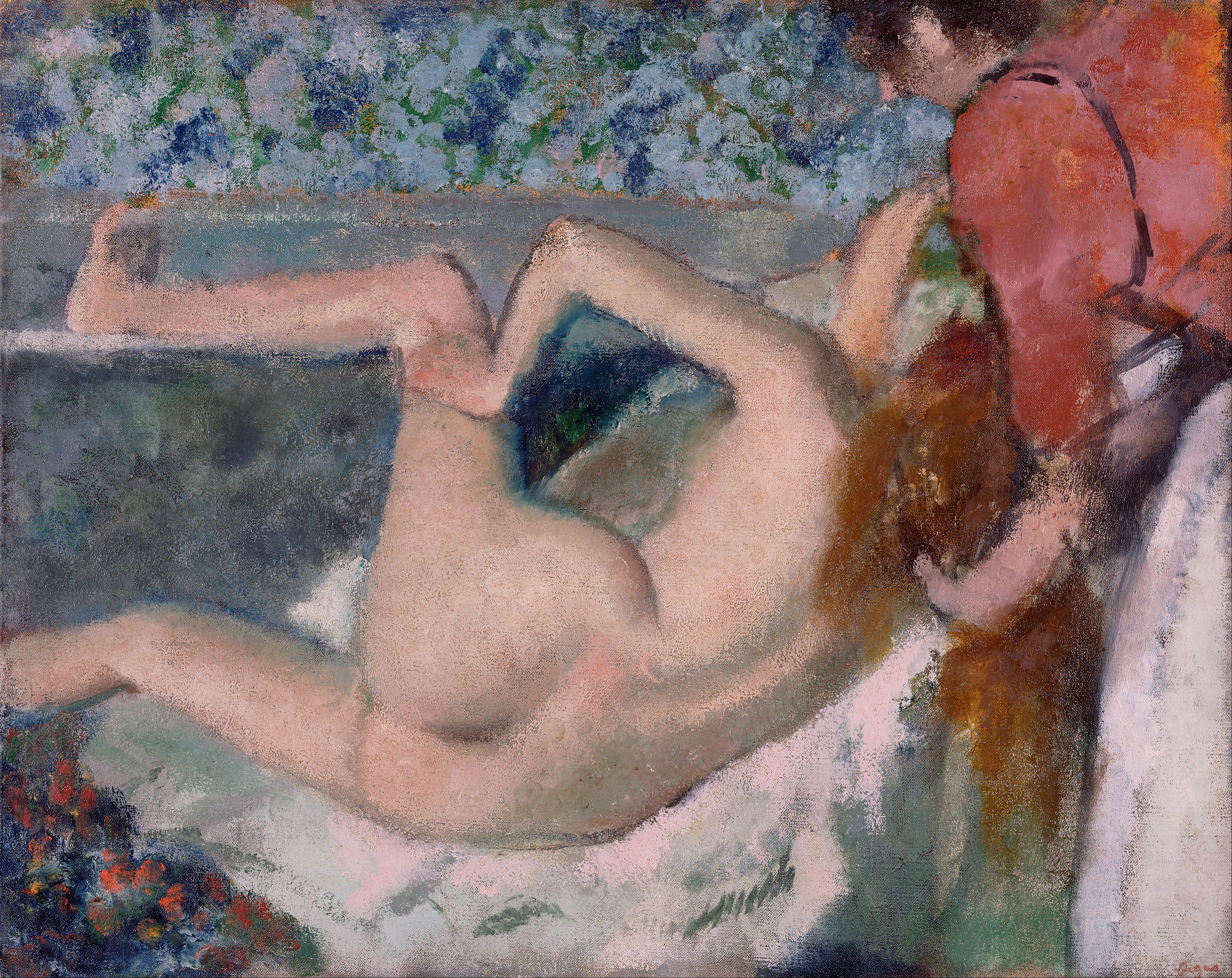
Edgar Degas After the Bath, 1895

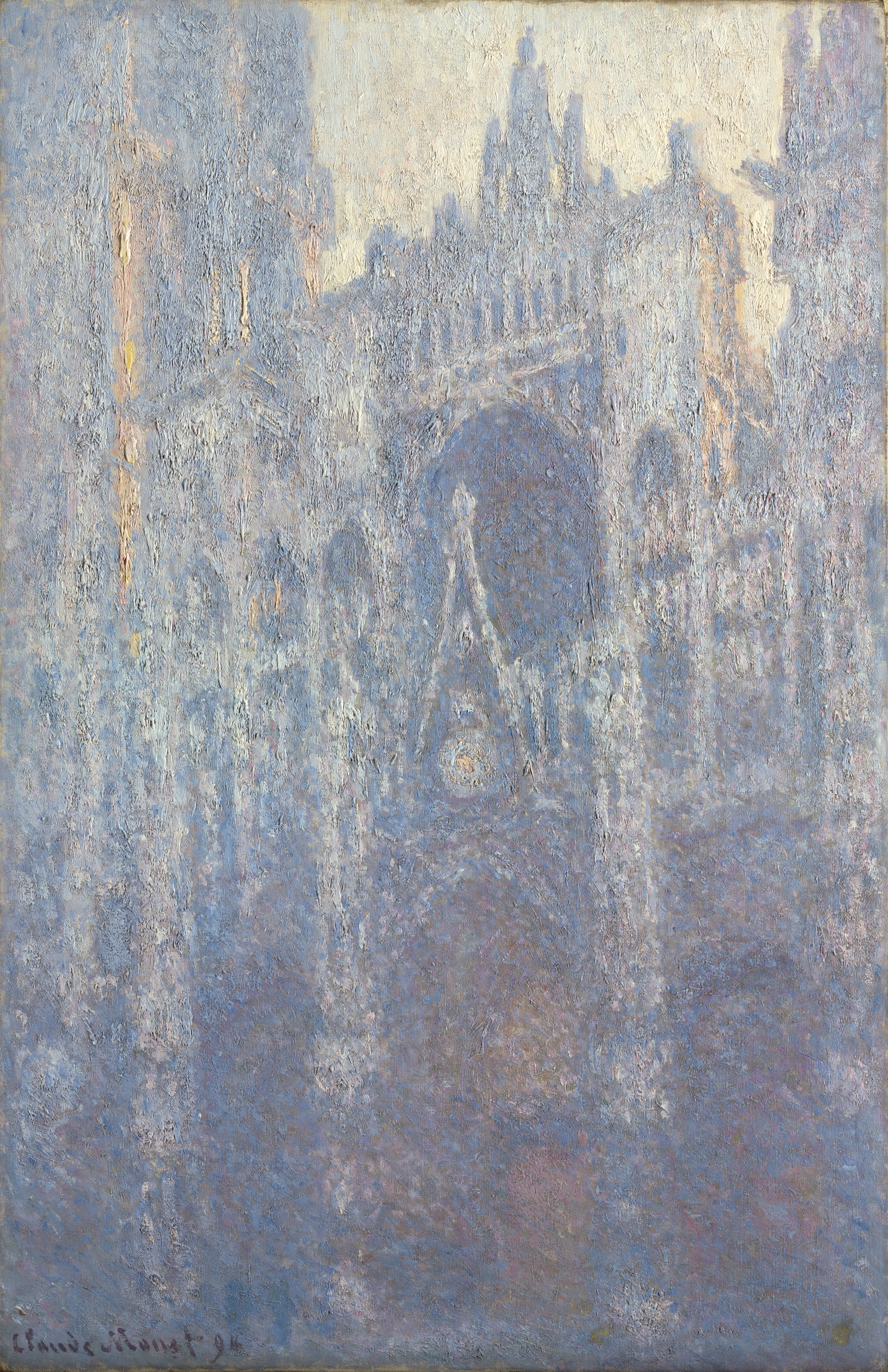
Claude Monet The Portal of Rouen Cathedral in Morning Light, 1894

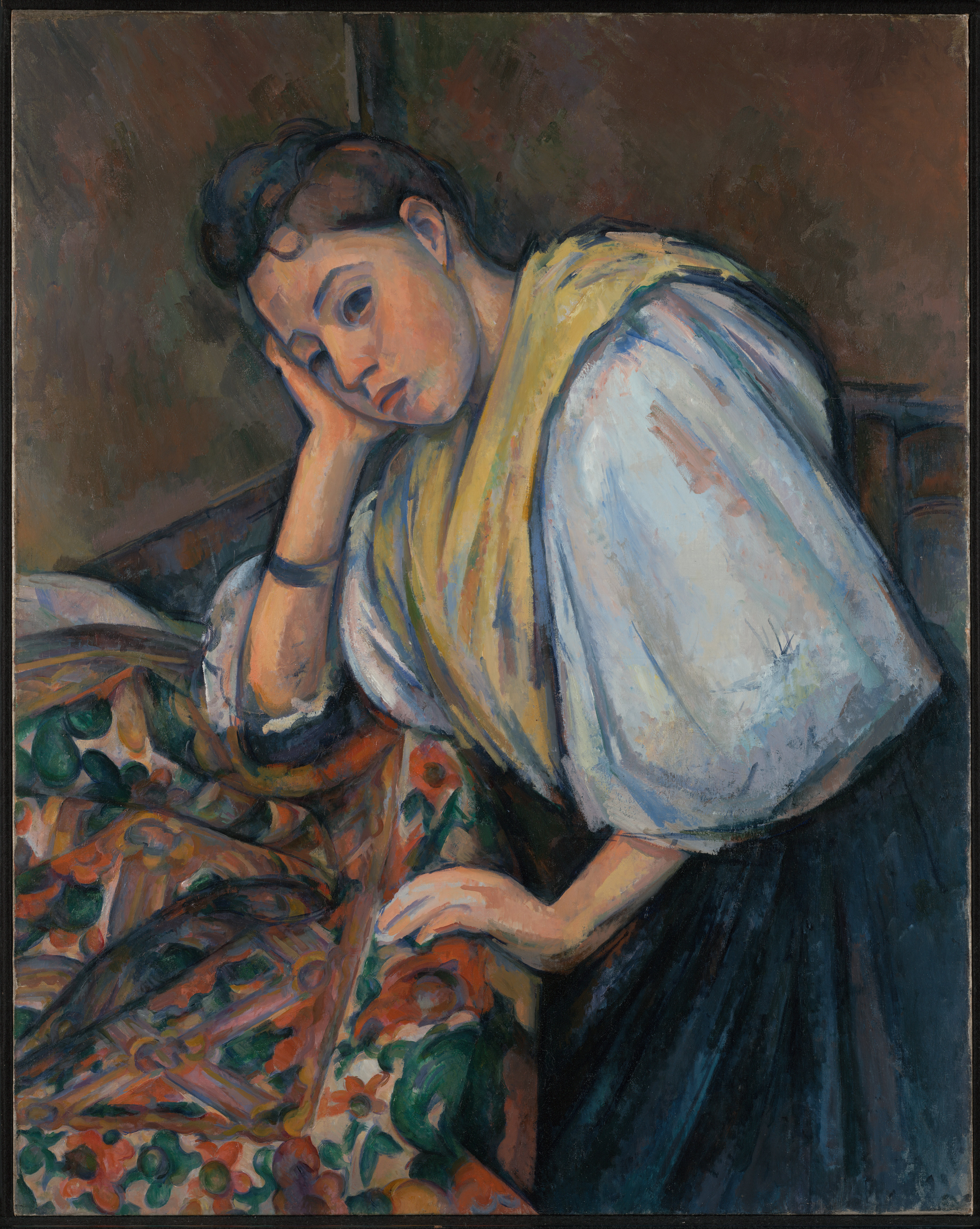
Paul Cézanne, Young Italian Woman at a Table, 1895

== Selected objects at the Getty Center ==
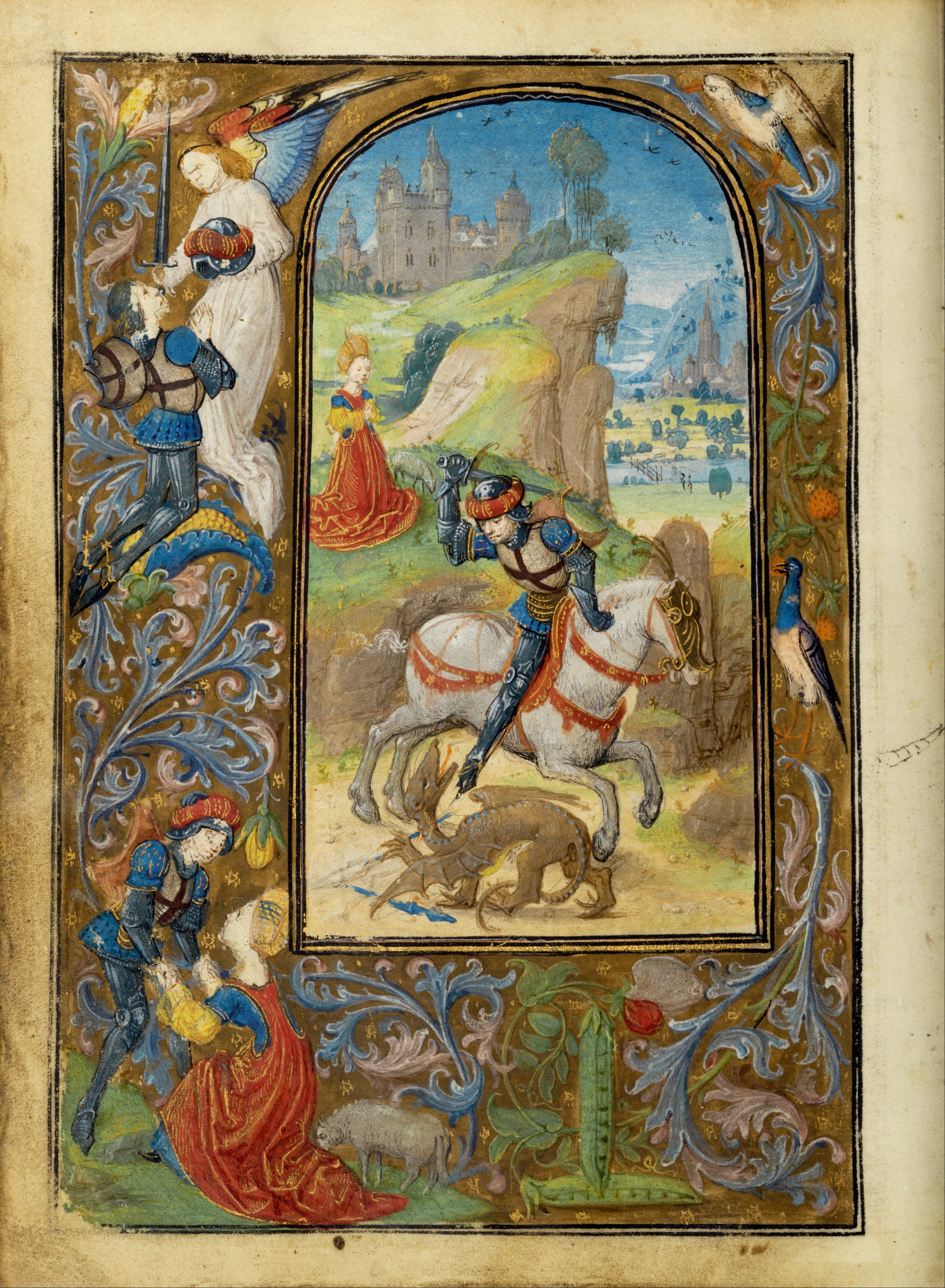
Lieven van Lathem, a page from Roman de Gillion de Trazegnies, 1471

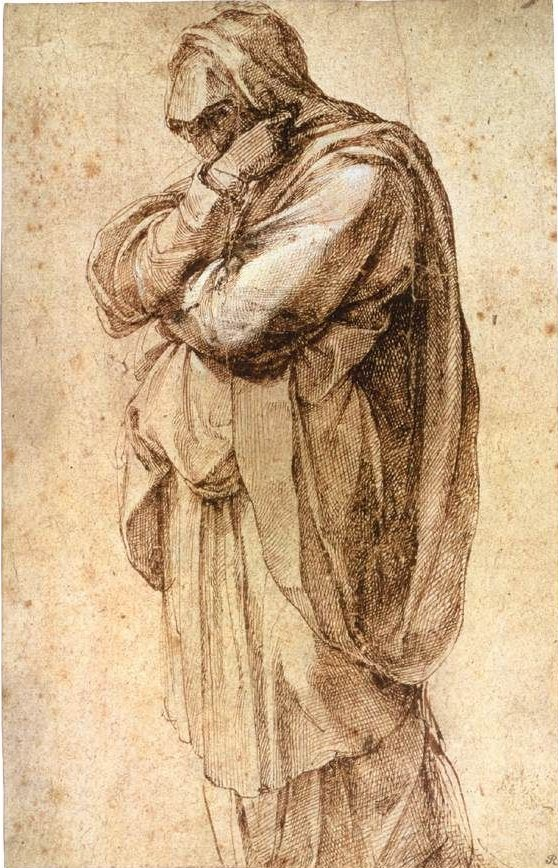
Michelangelo, Study of a Mourning Woman, 1500–05

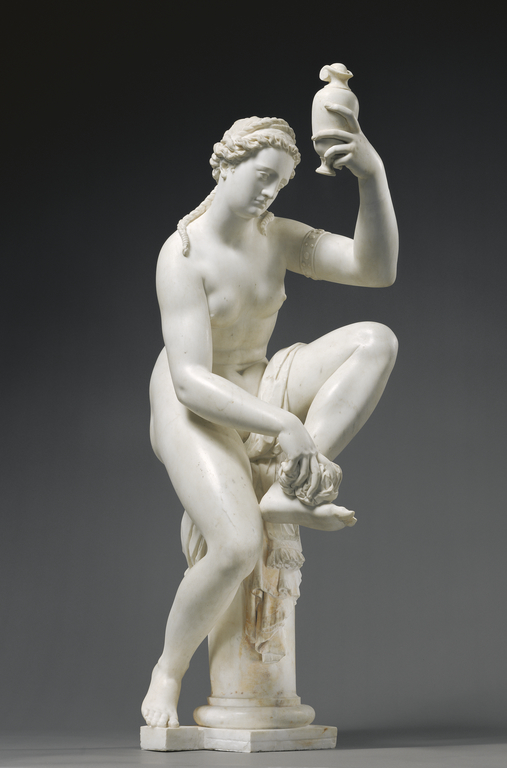
Giambologna, Female Figure (Giambologna), 1571–73

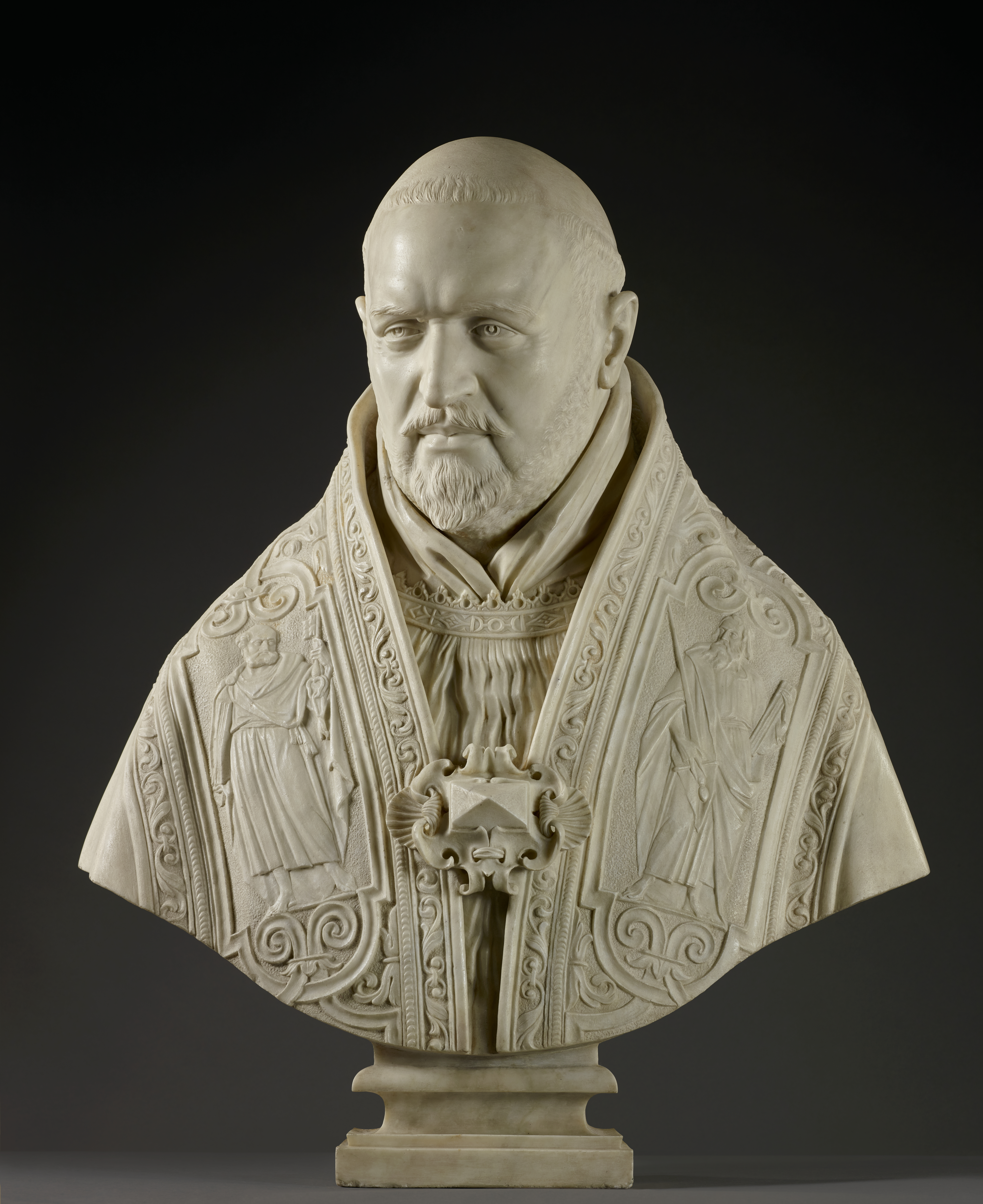
Gian Lorenzo Bernini, Bust of Pope Paul V, 1621

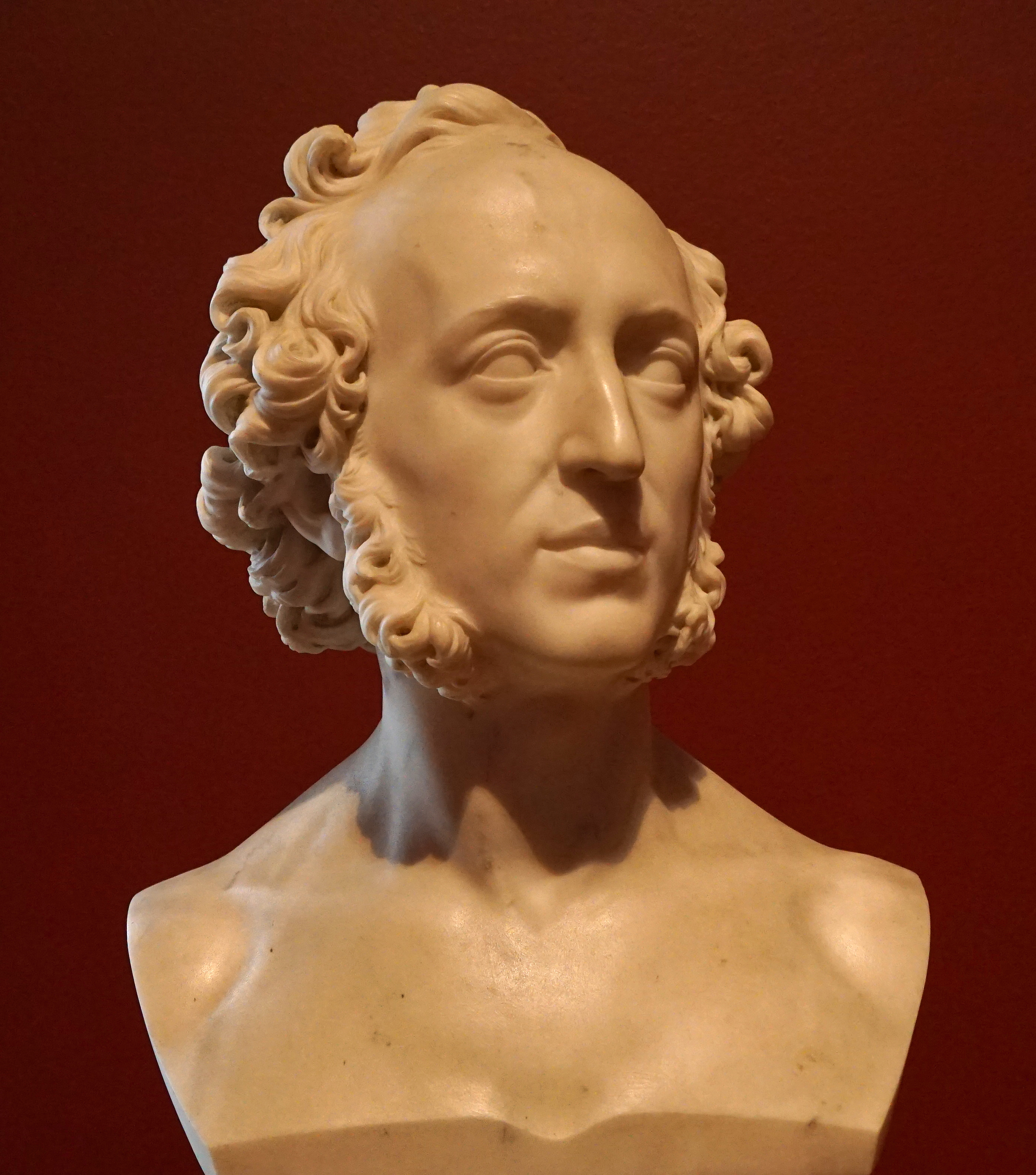
Ernst Rietschel, Bust of Felix Mendelssohn, 1848

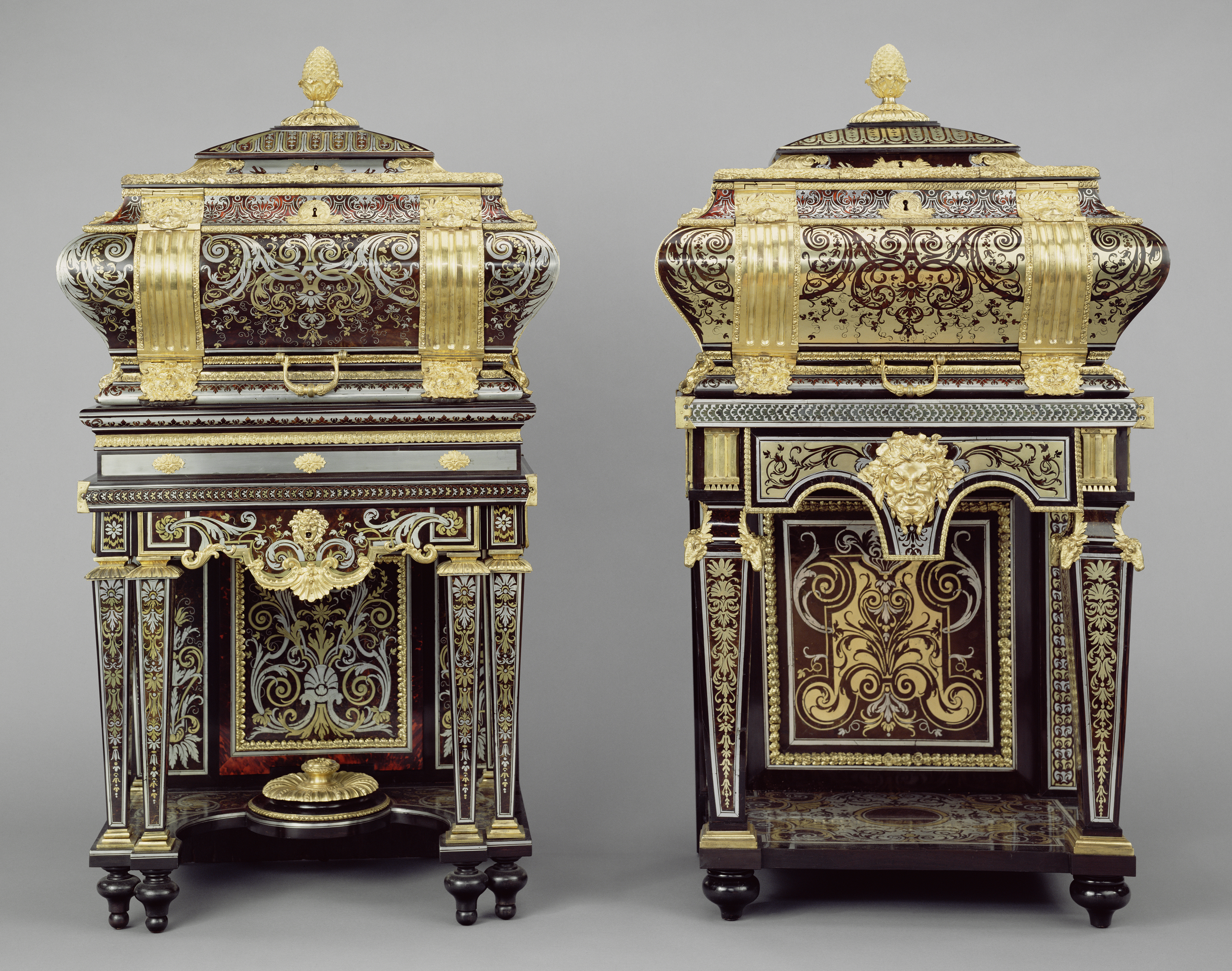
André-Charles Boulle, c. 1670.

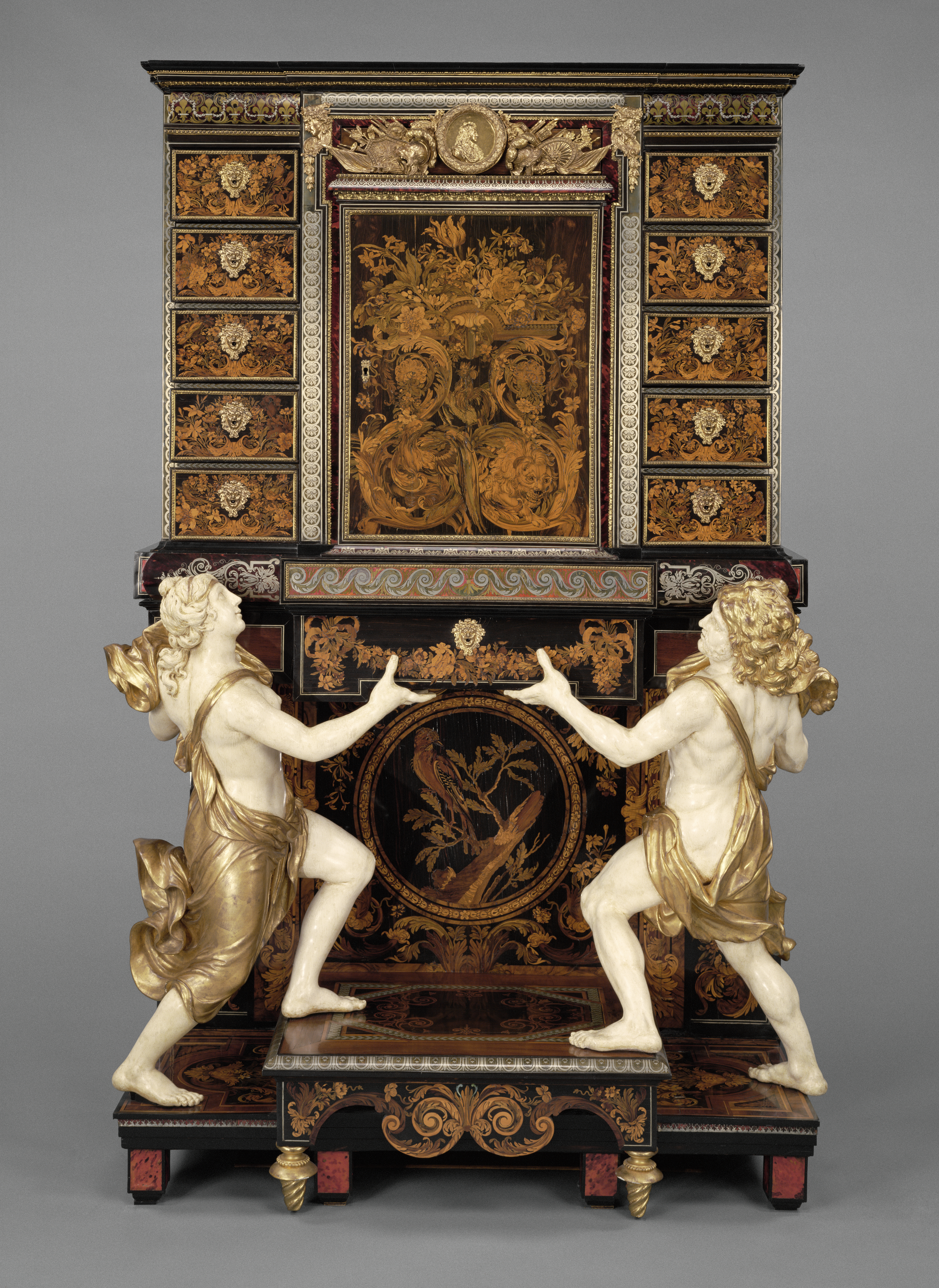
André-Charles Boulle, c. 1675.

== Selected photographs at the Getty Center ==
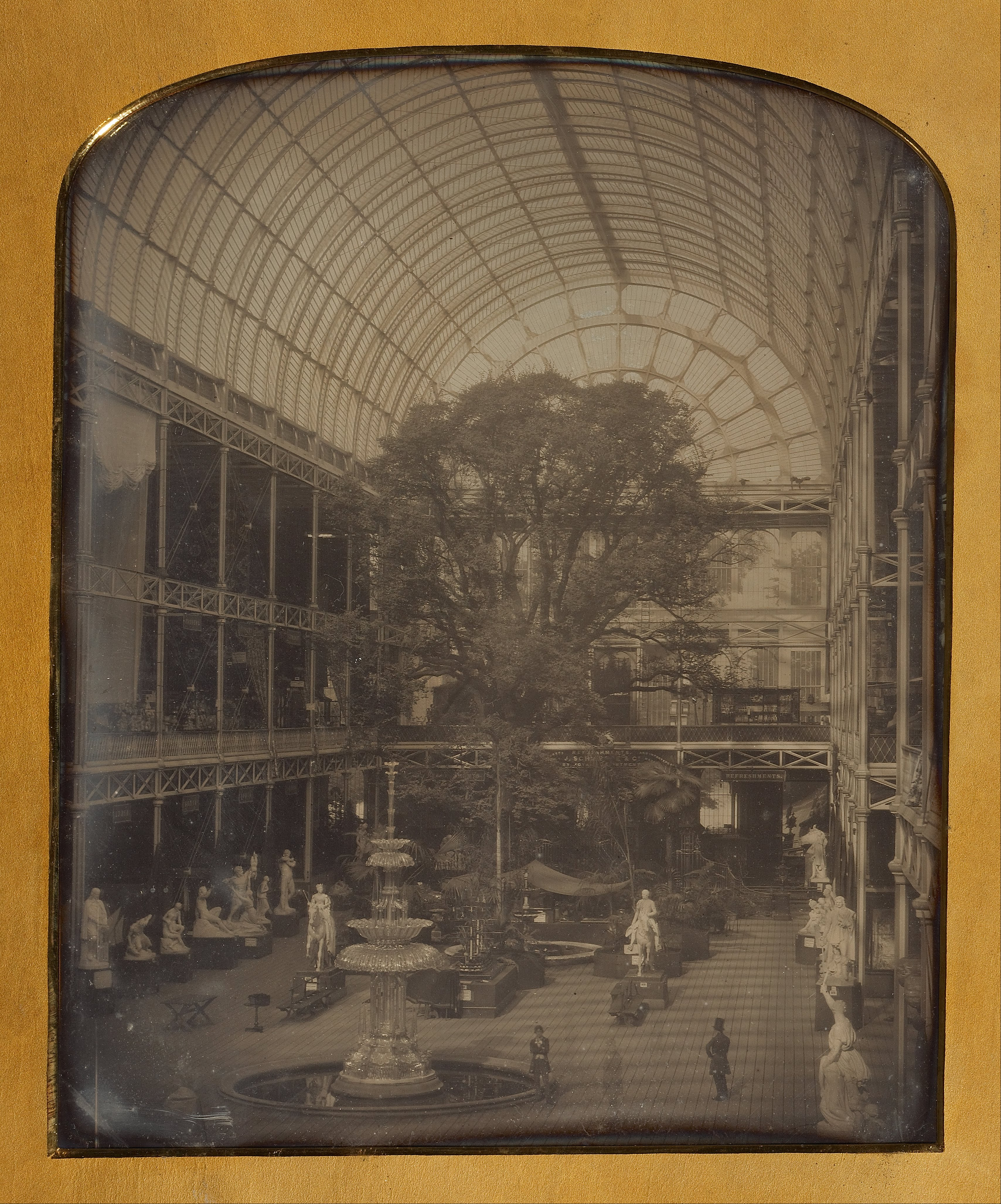
John Jabez Edwin Mayall, The Crystal Palace at Hyde Park, London, 1851

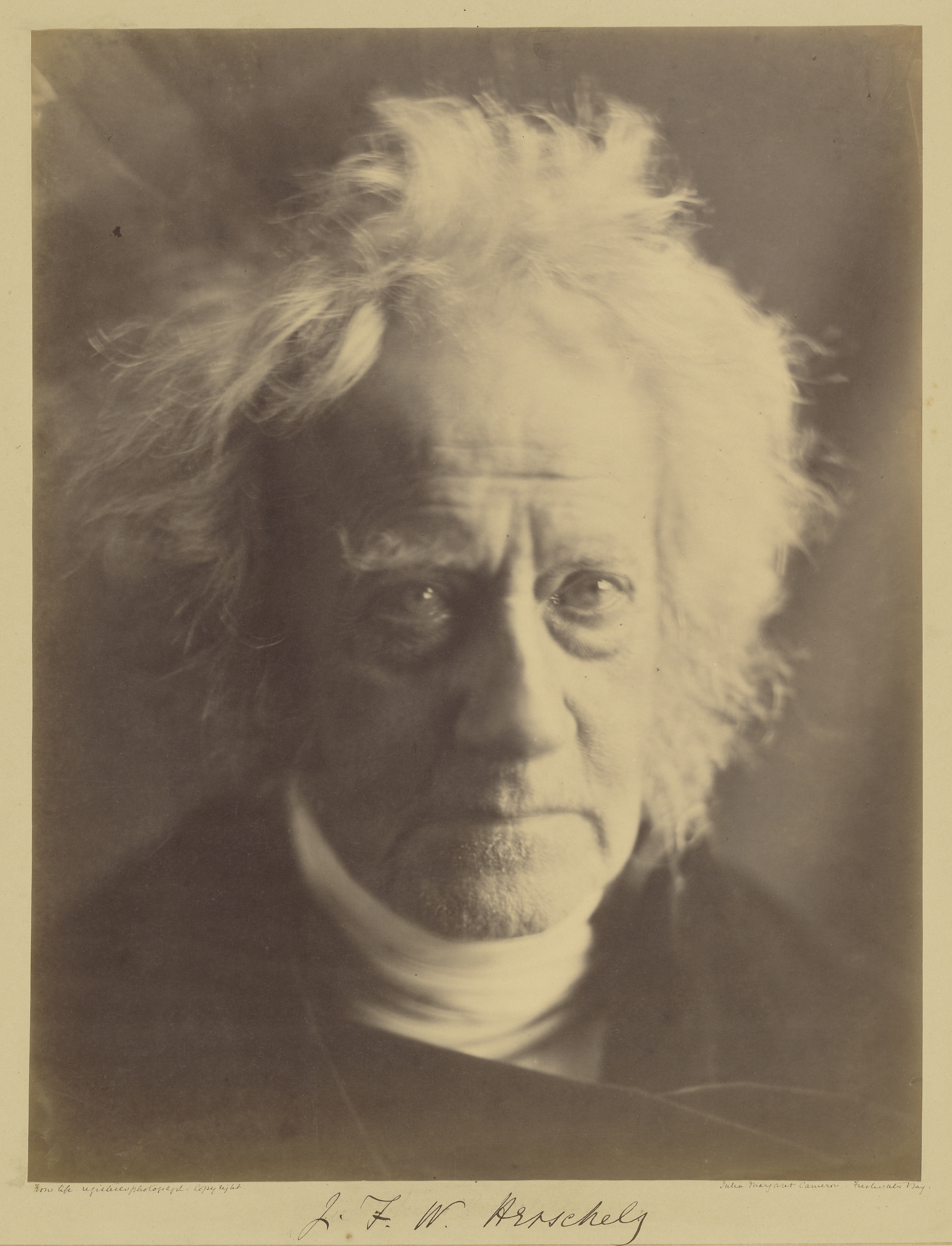
Julia Margaret Cameron, J.F.W. Herschel, April 1867

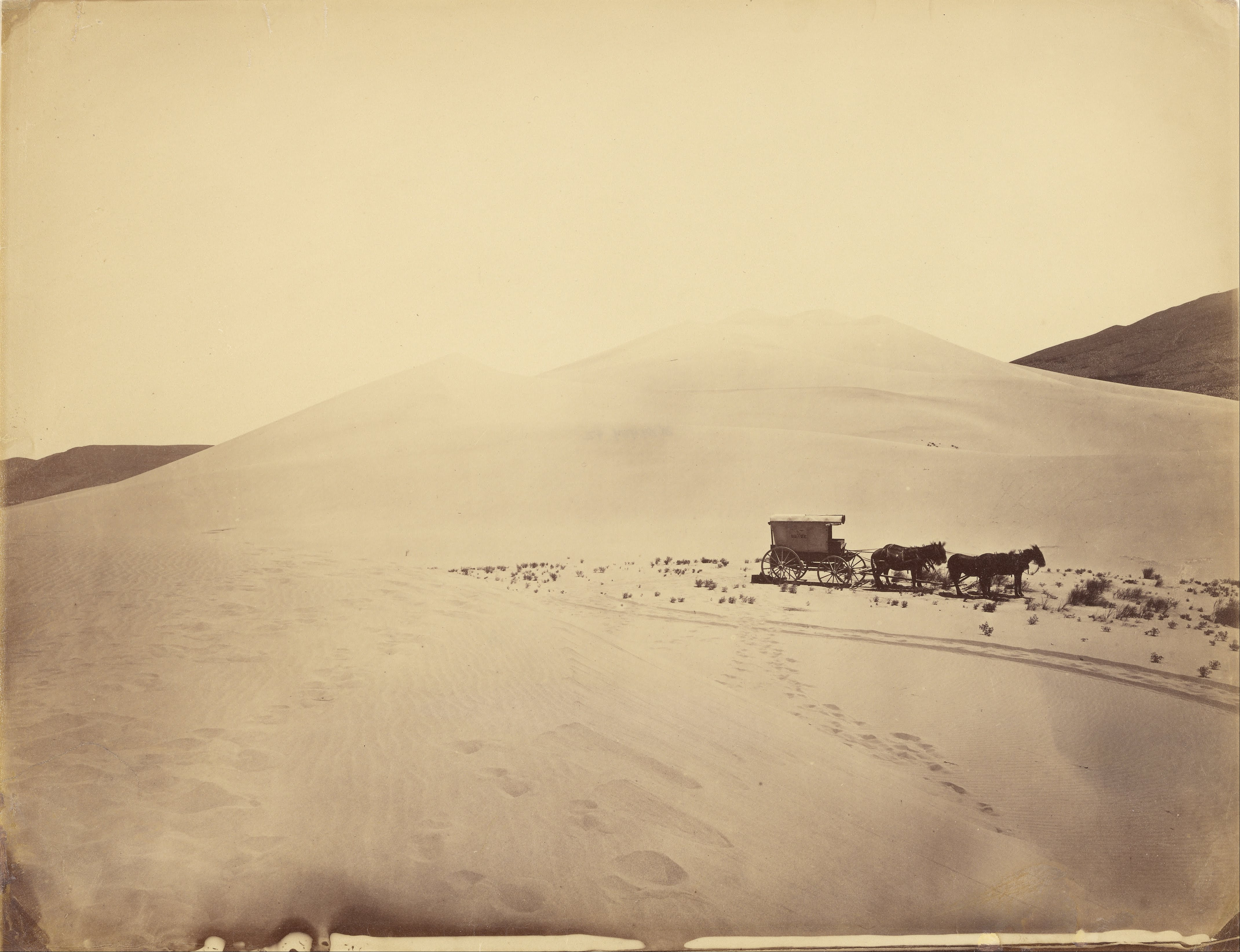
Timothy H. O'Sullivan, [Desert Sand Hills near Sink of Carson, Nevada], 1867

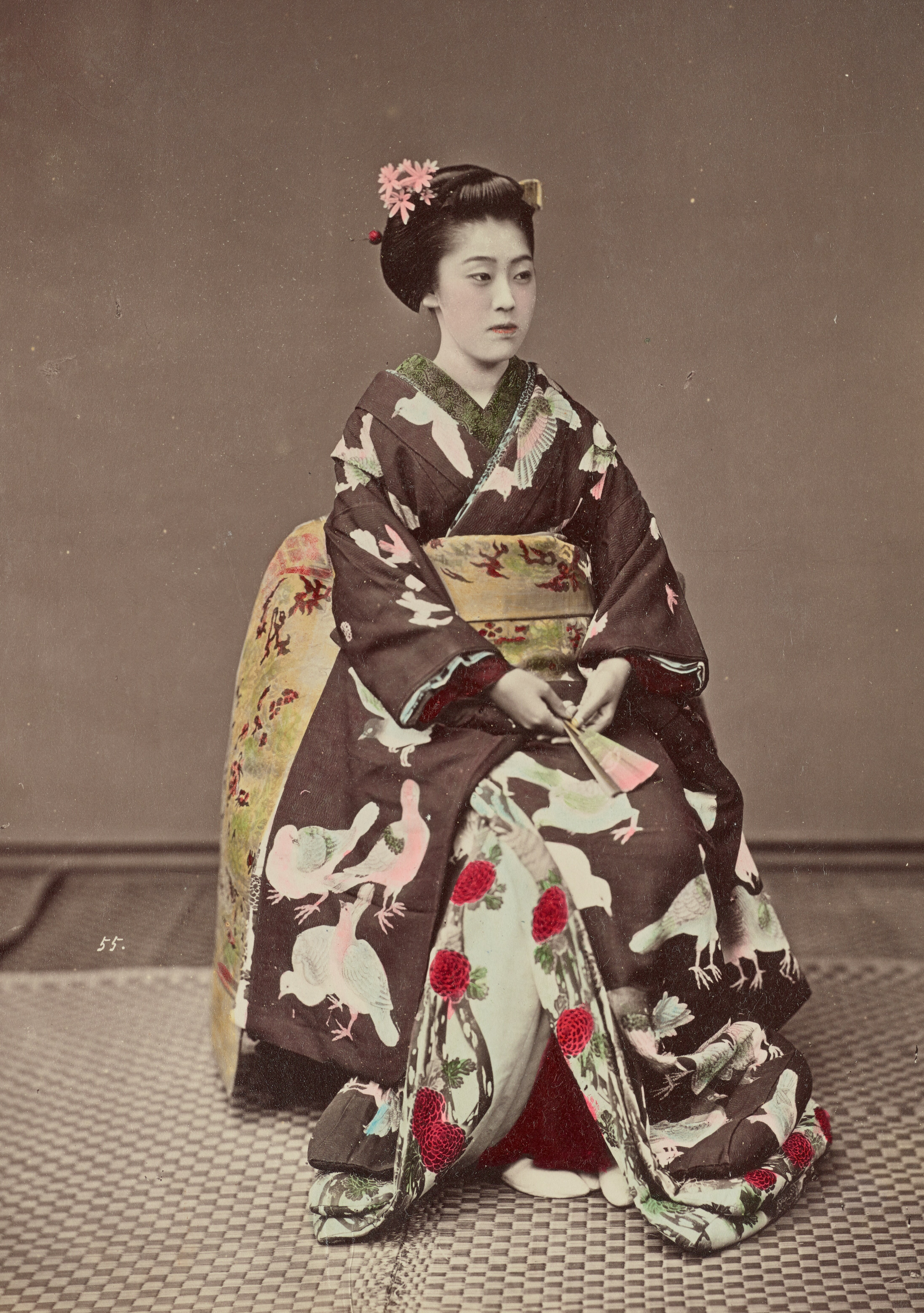
Kusakabe Kimbei, [Seated Woman], c. 1870–c. 1890

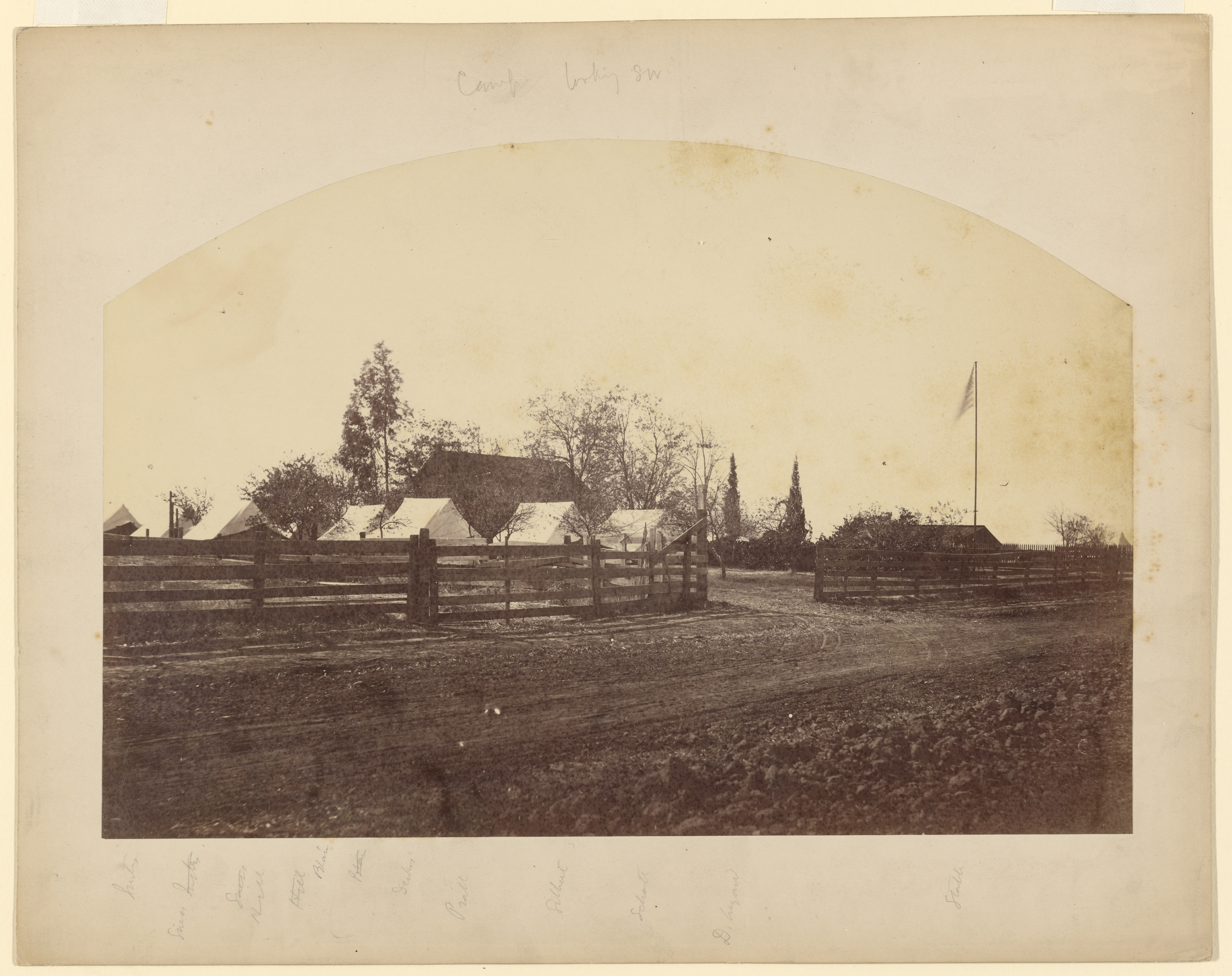
Carleton Watkins, Camp Looking SW, 1881

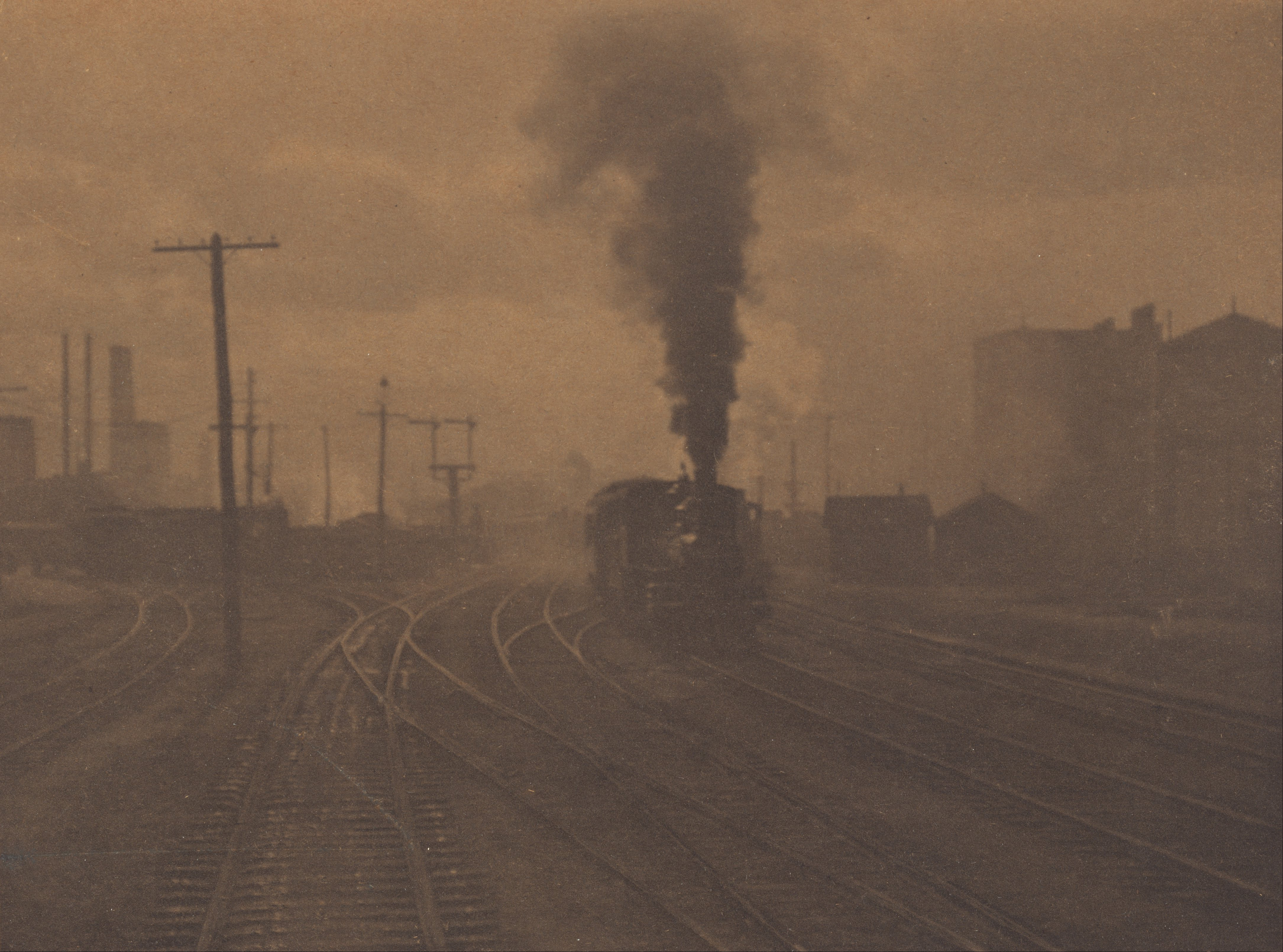
Alfred Stieglitz, The Hand of Man, 1902

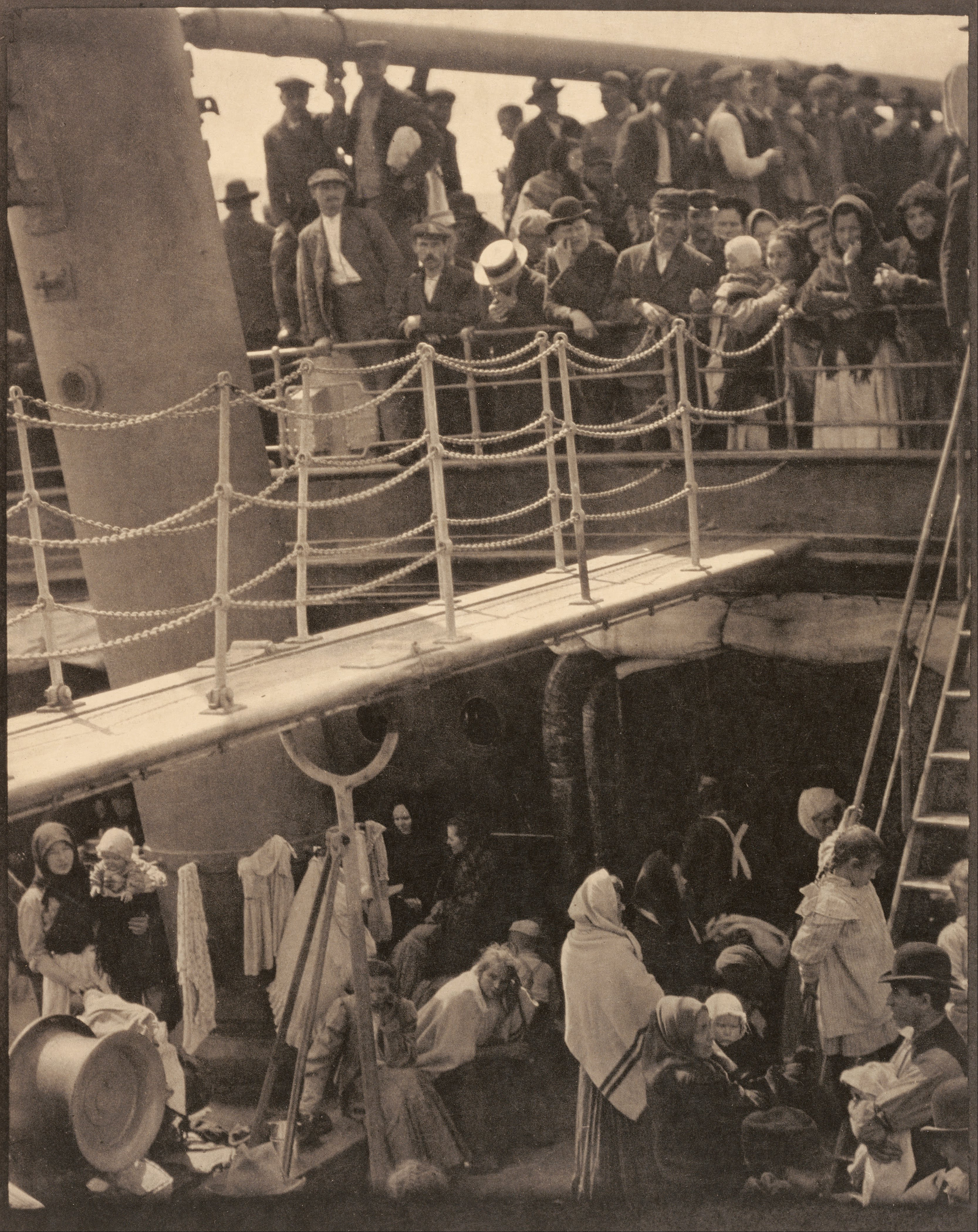
Alfred Stieglitz, The Steerage, 1907

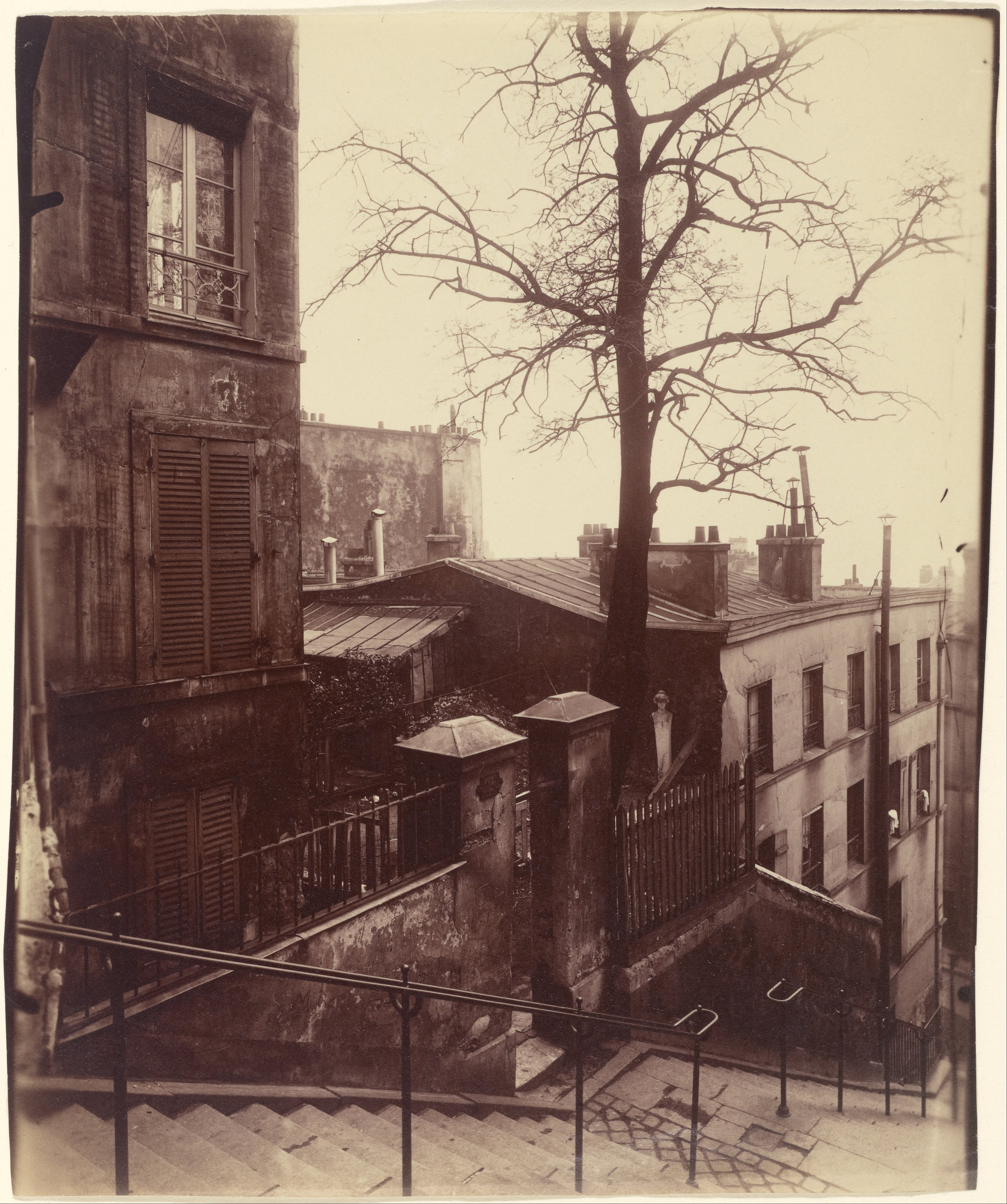
Eugène Atget, Staircase, Montmartre, 1921

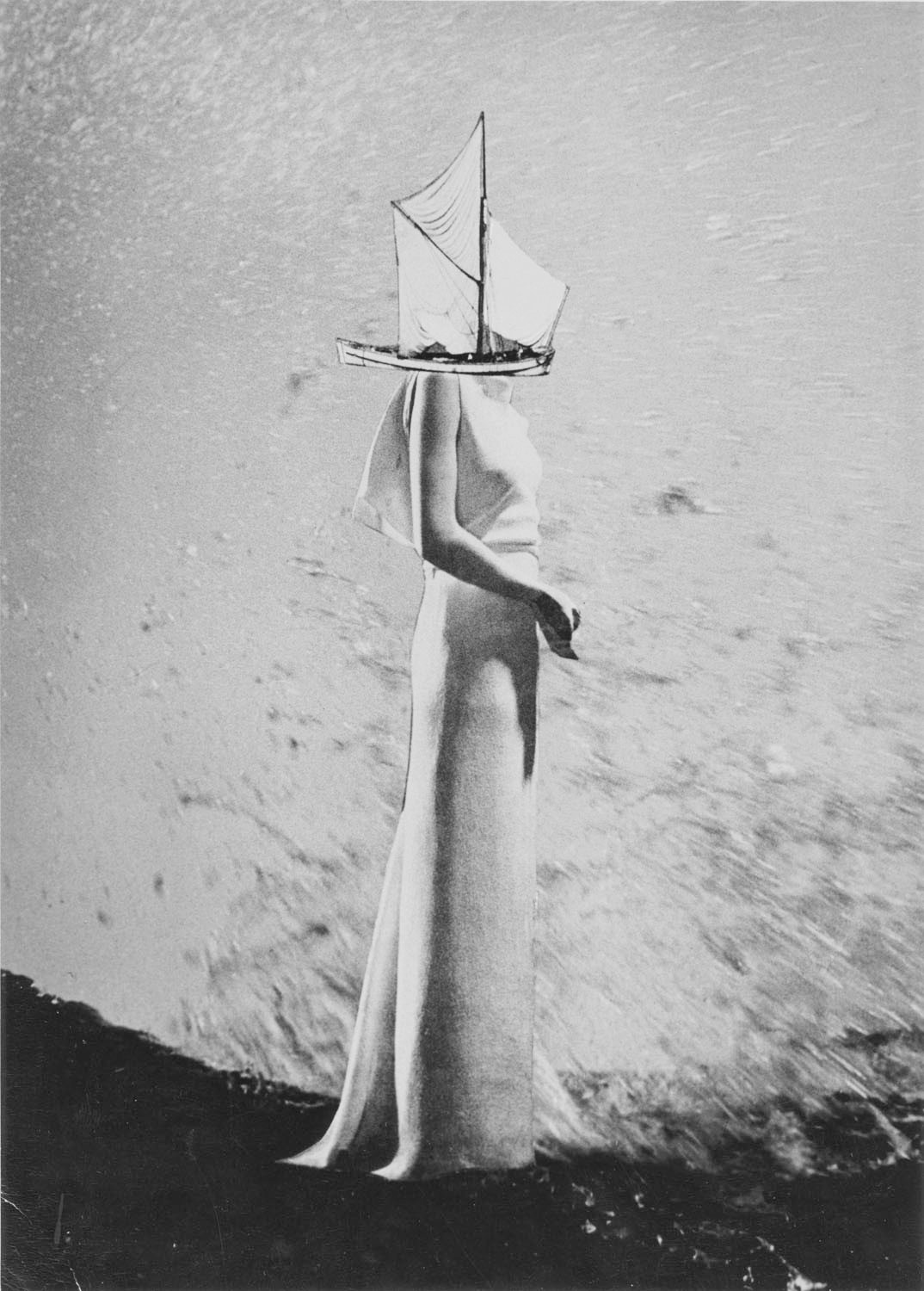
Kansuke Yamamoto, A Chronicle of Drifting, 1949

== See also ==
- Getty Conservation Institute
- Getty Foundation
- Getty Research Institute
- List of most-visited museums in the United States
