= 1754 in art =

Events from the year 1754 in art.

== Events ==
- Society for the encouragement of Arts, Manufactures & Commerce founded in England by William Shipley.
- Joshua Kirby publishes the pamphlet Dr. Brook Taylor's Method of Perspective made Easy both in Theory and Practice in London, containing William Hogarth's Satire on False Perspective.

== Paintings ==
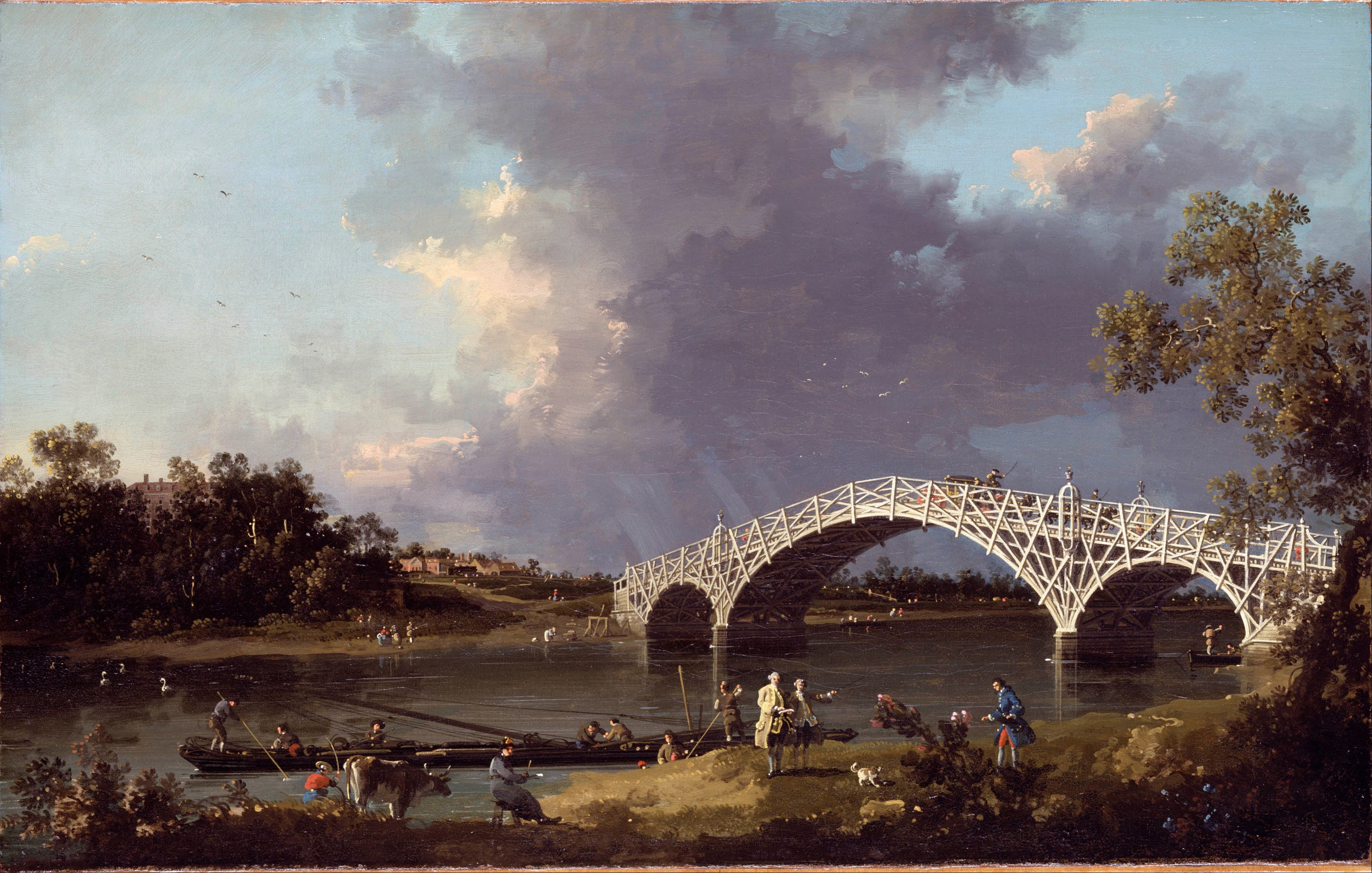
Canaletto – A View of Walton Bridge

- Canaletto
  - English Landscape Capriccio with a Column (National Gallery of Art, Washington D.C.)
  - English Landscape Capriccio with a Palace (National Gallery of Art, Washington D.C.)
  - Eton College (National Gallery, London)
  - Interior of the Rotunda at Ranelagh (National Gallery, London)
  - Old Walton Bridge (Dulwich Picture Gallery, London)
  - St. Paul's Cathedral (Yale Center for British Art, New Haven, Connecticut)
- John Giles Eccardt – Horace Walpole
- William Hogarth – Humours of an Election (four paintings)
- Claude-Joseph Vernet
  - Interior of the Port of Marseille
  - A Storm with a Shipwreck
- Richard Wilson – Rome from the Ponte Molle

== Births ==
- February 5 – Gilles-Louis Chrétien, French musician and creator of the physionotrace used for portraits (died 1811)
- April 12 – Peter Haas, German-Danish engraver (died 1804)
- May 8 – Amos Doolittle, American engraver (died 1832)
- May 10 – Asmus Jacob Carstens, Danish-German neoclassical artist (died 1798)
- May 17 – Antoine Berjon, French painter and designer (died 1843)
- May 26 – Jean-Louis Anselin, French engraver (died 1823)
- May 31 – Andrea Appiani, Milanese neoclassical painter (died 1817)
- August 2 – Pierre Charles L'Enfant, French architect and artist (died 1825)
- October 2 – Françoise-Jeanne Ridderbosch, Belgian painter and engraver (died 1837)
- October 9 – Jean-Baptiste Regnault, French painter (died 1829)
- October 29 – Claude Ramey, French sculptor (died 1838)
- December 20 – Francesco Manno, Italian painter and architect (died 1831)
- date unknown
  - Kim Deuk-sin, Korean painter, official painter of the Joseon court (died 1822)
  - John Graham, Scottish painter and teacher of art (died 1817)
  - Emanuel Granberg, Finnish painter (died 1797)
  - Charles Grignion the Younger, British history and portrait painter and engraver (died 1804)
  - Ivan Martos, Russian-Ukrainian sculptor and art teacher (died 1835)
  - Jean Népomucène Hermann Nast, Austrian-born French porcelain manufacturer (died 1817)
  - Victor-Jean Nicolle, French landscape and architecture painter (died 1824)
  - Marie-Elisabeth Simons, Belgian painter (died 1774)
  - Paul Theodor van Brussel, Dutch flower painter (died 1795)
  - Arend Johan van Glinstra, Dutch painter (died 1814)

== Deaths ==
- April 28
  - Roland Paradis, French silversmith working in New France (born 1696)
  - Giovanni Battista Piazzetta, Italian rococo painter (born 1682)
- May 2 – Thomas Restout, French painter (born 1671)
- May 5 – Giovan Battista Caniana, Italian sculptor and architect (born 1671)
- June 25 - Pierre-Jacques Cazes, French historical painter (born 1676)
- July 5 – Charles-Nicolas Cochin the Elder, French line-engraver (born 1688)
- October 22 – Peter von Bemmel, German landscape painter and etcher (born 1686)
- December 1 – Jean-Joseph Vinache, French sculptor (born 1696)
- date unknown
  - Fedor Leontyevich Argunov, Russian painter (born 1716)
  - Giovanni Costanzi, Italian gem engraver of the late-Baroque period (born 1674)
