= Victor-Jean =

Victor-Jean is a masculine given name. Notable people with the name include:

- Victor-Jean Nicolle (1754–1826), French painter
- Victor-Jean Perrin (1894–1971), French bishop
