= List of works by Canaletto =

This is a list of works by Italian/Venetian renaissance painter Giovanni Antonio Canal, better known as "Canaletto".

| Work | Title | Date | Location |
|---|---|---|---|
| | Campo San Giacomo di Rialto, Venice | 1697–1768 | Sotheby's – New York City |
| | Canal Scene, Venice | 1697–1768 | Walters Art Museum – Baltimore, US |
| | Place Saint Marc | 1697–1768 | Musée d'art et d'histoire de Narbonne – France |
| | Le Grand Canal à Sainte Lucie | 1697–1768 | Fondation Bemberg – Toulouse, France |
| | The Grand Canal from Campo della Carità | 1697–1768 | Gallerie dell'Accademia |
| | Place of San Giacomo di Rialto in Venice | 1697–1768 | Gemäldegalerie Alte Meister, Germany |
| | Venise la place Saint-Marc-Le | 1697–1768 | Musée des beaux-arts de Brest – France |
| | Campo dei Gesuiti | 1697–1768 | Private Collection |
| | The Square and the church San Francesco della Vigna | 1697–1768 | Private collection, Milan |
| | Architectural Capriccio | 1697–1768 | Morgan Library and Museum – New York |
| | Piazzetta in Venice | 1700s | Alte Pinakothek, Munich, Germany |
| | Venice: the Grand Canal | 1700s | LLL Art Galleries |
| | Capriccio Piazza San Marco | 1720s | Metropolitan Museum of Art- Manhattan, New York |
| | The Grand Canal near the Rialto Bridge, Venice | 1720s | Museum of Fine Arts, Houston, US |
| | The Piazzetta towards San Giorgio Maggiore | 1720 | Institut of Applied Statistics, archive of the art department |
| | The Pantheon | 1720 | Dayton Art Institute, US |
| | Capriccio with Gothic church and lagoon | c. 1720–21 | Galleria d'Italia – Palazzo Leoni Montanari, Vicenza |
| | Grand Canal, Looking Northeast from Palazo Balbi toward the Rialto Bridge | 1720–1723 | Ca' Rezzonico, Venice, Italy |
| | San Cristoforo, San Michele and Murano from the Fondamenta Nuove, Venice | 1722–23 | Dallas Museum of Art, Dallas, Texas, United States |
| | The Grand Canal in Venice with the Palazzo Corner Ca'Grande | 1722–23 | Gallery of Paintings of the Ancient Masters |
| | Piazza di San Marco, em Veneza | 1723 | Instituto Ricardo Brennand (IRB), Brazil |
| | Piazza San Marco in Venice looking West with the Campanile | 1723 | House of Liechtenstein, Liechtenstein |
| | Piazza San Marco Looking East along the Central Line | 1723–24 | Thyssen-Bornemisza Museum, Madrid, Spain |
| | Grand Canal, Looking East from the Campo San Vio | 1723–24 | Thyssen-Bornemisza Museum, Madrid, Spain |
| | Rio dei Mendicanti | 1723–24 | Ca' Rezzonico, Venice, Italy |
| | Piazza San Marco looking west towards San Geminiano | 1723–24 | Royal Collection, United Kington |
| | The Rio dei Mendicanti | 1723–24 | Ca' Rezzonico, Venice |
| | The Piazzetta towards San Giorgio Maggiore | c. 1724 | Royal Collection, Buckingham Palace, England |
| | The Grand Canal, Venice, Looking North East from the Palazzo Balbi to the Rialto Bridge (1) | c. 1724 | Private collection |
| | The Grand Canal, Looking North-East from Palazzo Balbi to the Rialto Bridge (2) | c. 1724 | Private collection |
| | The Grand Canal looking south-west from the Rialto to Ca’ Foscari | 1724–25 | Royal Collection, RU |
| | The Riva degli Schiavoni | 1724–30 | Kunsthistorisches Museum, Vienna |
| | Dogana | 1724-c.30 | Kunsthistorisches Museum, Vienna |
| | The Stonemason's Yard | c. 1725 | National Gallery, London, England |
| | Rio dei Mendicanti: Looking South | c. 1725 | Gemäldegalerie Alte Meister, Dresden, Germany |
| | Entrance to the Grand Canal – Looking East | 1725 | Gemäldegalerie Alte Meister, Dresden, Germany |
| | Grand Canal – Looking North-East toward the Rialto Bridge (detail) | 1725 | Gemäldegalerie Alte Meister, Dresden, Germany |
| | Doge Palace | 1725 | Columbia Museum of Art, US |
| | The Parvis of the churches Saint Jean and Saint Paul | 1725 | Gemäldegalerie Alte Meister, Germany |
| | Il Canal Grande dalle prossimità del ponte di Rialto | 1725 | Pinacoteca Giovanni e Marella Agnelli, Turin, Italy |
| | Il ponte di Rialto da nord | 1725 | Pinacoteca Giovanni e Marella Agnelli, Turin, Italy |
| | The Grand Canal near the Ponte di Rialto | 1725 | Private collection |
| | The Bacino di San Marco, Venice | 1725–26 | Farnborough Hall, Warwickshire |
| | San Giacomo di Rialto | 1725–26 | Gemäldegalerie Alte Meister |
| | View of the Isles of San Michele, San Cristoforo and Murano from the Fondamenta Nuove | 1725–28 | Hermitage Museum, Saint Petersburg, Russia |
| | View of Church of San Giovanni dei Battuti on the Isle of Murano | 1725–1728 | Hermitage Museum, Saint Petersburg, Russia |
| | A View of Dolo on the Brenta Canal | 1725–1729 | Ashmolean Museum, Oxford, England |
| | The Piazzetta Looking South-west towards S. Maria della Salute | 1725–1730 | Royal Collection at Windsor Castle, England |
| | The Piazzetta Looking towards the Torre dell'Orologio | 1725–1730 | Royal Collection at Windsor Castle, England |
| | San Giacomo di Rialto | c. 1726 | Gemäldegalerie Alte Meister, Dresden, Germany |
| | The Grand Canal near San Maria della Carità | 1726 | Pinacoteca Giovanni e Marella Agnelli, Turin, Italy |
| | Santi Giovanni e Paolo and the Scuola di San Marco | 1726 | Private collection |
| | The Bacino di San Marco, Venice, Seen from the Giudecca | 1726 | Upton House, National Trust, England |
| | Grand Canal: Looking from Palazzo Balbi | c. 1726 | Gemäldegalerie Alte Meister, Dresden, Germany |
| | Grand Canal: Looking North from Near the Rialto Bridge (1) | c. 1726 | Gemäldegalerie Alte Meister, Dresden, Germany |
| | Venice: the Grand Canal Looking North from the Rialto Bridge (2) | 1726–27 | Royal Collection, Windsor Castle, England |
| | Rialto Bridge from the North | 1726–27 | Royal Collection, England |
| | The Grand Canal with the Scalzi and S. Simeone Piccolo | 1726–27 | Royal Collection, England |
| | The Reception of the French Ambassador Jacques–Vincent Languet, Comte de Gergy at the Doge's Palace, Venice | 1726–27 | Hermitage Museum, Saint Petersburg, Russia |
| | Venice: S. Geremia and the Entrance to the Cannaregio | 1726–1727 | Royal Collection, Windsor Castle, England |
| | The Grand Canal looking south from Ca’ Foscari to the Carità | 1726–1727 | Royal Collection, RU |
| | Embouchure du grand canal-musée de Grenoble | 1726–28 | Musée de Grenoble, France |
| | Veduta del Canal Grande | 1726–28 | Galleria degli Uffizi, Florencia, Italy |
| | The Stonemason's Yard | 1726–1730 (or 1727) | National Gallery, London, England |
| | View of the Grand Canal | 1726–28 | Galleria degli Uffizi, Florencia |
| | Grand Canal – The Rialto Bridge from the South | 1727 | Holkham Hall |
| | View of the Salute Church from the entrance to the Grand Canal detalle | 1727 | Musées de la Ville de Strasbourg |
| | Venice: The Grand Canal from the Palazzo Vendramin-Calergi towards S. Geremia | 1727–28 | Royal Collection, Windsor Castle, England |
| | Return of the Bucintoro to the Molo on Ascension Day | 1727–1732 | Royal Collection, Windsor Castle, England |
| | Benetke, pogled s San Giorgio Maggiore | 1727–1730 | Pomurje Museum Murska Sobota, Slovenia |
| | The Grand Canal from the Campo San Vio | 1728 | National Gallery of Scotland |
| | The Clock Tower in the Piazza San Marco | 1728–1730 | Nelson-Atkins Museum of Art, Kansas City, US |
| | The Grand Canal near the Rialto Bridge, Venice | 1728–1732 | Museum of Fine Arts, Houston, US |
| | The Grand Canal with S. Maria della Salute towards the Riva degli Schiavoni | 1729–1730 | Royal Collection, England |
| | The Grand Canal from Campo San Vio towards the Bacino | 1729–1734 | Royal Collection, Windsor Castle, England |
| | View of the Grand Canal | Late 1720s | Birmingham Museum of Art, Birmingham, Alabama, United States |
| | Piazza San Marco (1) | Late 1720s | Metropolitan Museum of Art, Manhattan, New York, United States |
| | Piazza San Marco with the Basilica (2) | c. 1730 | Fogg Art Museum, US |
| | The Doge's Palace, Venice | c. 1730 | Fitzwilliam Museum, Cambridge, England |
| | The Doge's Palace and Riva degli Schiavoni, Venice | c. 1730 | Tatton Park, National Trust, England |
| | Rialto Bridge | c. 1730 | Philadelphia Museum of Art, US |
| | Reception of the Ambassador in the Doge's Palace | c. 1730 | Private collection |
| | View of the Grand Canal: Santa Maria della Salute and the Dogana from Campo Santa Maria Zobenigo | c. 1730 | Fitzwilliam Museum, Cambridge, England |
| | The Entrance to the Grand Canal, Venice | c. 1730 | Museum of Fine Arts, Houston, Houston, United States |
| | The Grand Canal, Piazzetta and Dogana, Venice | c. 1730 | Tatton Park, National Trust, England |
| | The Piazza San Marco, Venice, looking towards the procuratie nuove and the church of San Geminiano | c. 1730 | Private collection |
| | View of Molo, Venice | c. 1730 | El Paso Museum of Art, US |
| | The Molo, Venice, from the Bacino di San Marco (1) | 1730s | Private collection of Edward Howard, 9th Duke of Norfolk, England |
| | The Molo Seen from the Bacino di San Marco (2) | 1730s | Musée du Louvre, Paris, France |
| | Il molo visto dal bacino di san marco (3) | c. 1730 | |
| | Il molo visto dal bacino di san marco (4) | c. 1730 | |
| | Il molo visto dal bacino di san marco (5) | c. 1730 | |
| | Il molo visto dal bacino di san marco (6) | c. 1730 | |
| | The Entrance to the Grand Canal, Venice | 1730 | Museum of Fine Arts, Houston, US |
| | Veduta del canale di santa chiara a venezia (1) | c. 1730 | Collections of the Musée Cognacq-Jay |
| | Veduta del canale di santa chiara a venezia (2) | c. 1730 | Collections of the Musée Cognacq-Jay |
| | Veduta del canale di santa chiara a venezia (3) | c. 1730 | Collections of the Musée Cognacq-Jay |
| | Veduta del canale di santa chiara a venezia (4) | c. 1730 | Collections of the Musée Cognacq-Jay |
| | The Piazzetta, Venice, Looking North | 1730s | Norton Simon Museum, Pasadena, California |
| | The Grand Canal looking north-west from Ca' Corner to Ca' Contarini degli Scrigni, with the campanile of Santa Maria della Carità | 1730s | Norton Simon Museum, Pasadena, California |
| | The Interior of Henry VII's Chapel, Westminster Abbey | 1730s | Museum of London |
| | Fonteghetto della Farina | 1730s | Private Collection |
| | View of the Piazetta with the Southwest corner of the Doge Palace | 1730s | Private collection |
| | Piazza di San Marco, looking towards the Church of San Geminiano Woburn | 1730s | Woburn Abbey, England |
| | View Embarkation of the Doge of Venice, for the Ceremony of the Marriage of the Adriatic | 1730s | Woburn Abbey, England |
| | Campo Santa Maria Formosa | 1730s | Private collection |
| | The Bucintoro Returning to the Molo on Ascension Day after the Ceremony of Wedding the Adriatic | 1730s | Bowes Museum, United Kingdom |
| | The Grand Canal, Venice, Looking South toward the Rialto Bridge | 1730–39 | Metropolitan Museum of Art, Manhattan |
| | The Grand Canal, Venice, Looking Southeast, with the Campo della Carità to the Right | 1730–39 | Metropolitan Museum of Art, Manhattan |
| | Piazzetta Riva degli Schiavoni, Canaletto, WAF137, Alte Pinakothek Munich | 1730–1740 | Alte Pinakothek, Munich, Germany |
| | The Entrance to the Canal Grande at the Punta della Dogana and the Santa Maria della Salute | 1730–1745 | Rijksmuseum Amsterdam |
| | The Grand Canal seen from the Palazzo Balbi towards the Bridge of Rialto | 1730–1750 | Accademia Carrara, Italy |
| | Venice: the Grand Canal with S. Maria della Salute towards the Riva degli Schiavoni | 1730 | Royal Collection, Windsor Castle, England |
| | Piazza San Marco – the Clocktower | 1730 | Nelson-Atkins Museum of Art, Kansas City, US |
| | Dogenpalast | 1730 | Royal Collection, Windsor Castle, England |
| | The Grand Canal from the Salute towards the Carità | 1730 | Royal Collection, RU |
| | Dogenpalast | 1730 | Private Collection |
| | Doge Palace | 1730 | Columbia Museum of Art, USA |
| | The Bacino di San Marco, Looking North | 1730 | National Museum, Cardiff, Wales |
| | The Canale di San Marco with the Bucintoro at Anchor | 1730–1733 | Windsor Castle, English |
| | The Bucintoro Returning to the Molo on Ascension Day | 1730–1735 | Bowes Museum, Barnard Castle, England |
| | Piazza San Marco, Venice | 1730 –1735 | Fogg Museum, Cambridge, Massachusetts |
| | Le Burchiello à Venise | 1730 –1735 | Musée Cognacq-Jay, Paris |
| | La Piazzetta | 1730–1735 | Galleria Nazionale d'Arte Antica, Rome |
| | A Regatta on the Grand Canal | 1730–1735 | Bowes Museum, Barnard Castle, England |
| | Il Canale Grande a Rialto | 1730–1750 | Museo Nacional del Prado. Spain |
| | La Piazzetta | 1730–1750 | Galleria Nazionale d'Arte Antica, Rome |
| | La Régate sur le Grand Canal | 1731–32 | Bowes Museum, Barnard Castle |
| | A Regatta on the Grand Canal | 1732 | Royal Collection at Windsor Castle |
| | View of the entrance to the Arsenal | 1732 | Private collection |
| | Rescloses de Dolo | 1732–35 | Staatsgalerie Stuttgart, Germany |
| | Return of the Bucentoro to the Molo on Ascension Day | 1733–1734 | Collection Buckingham Palace, England |
| | A View of the Rialto, Venice | 1734–35 | Sir John Soane's Museum, London, England |
| | The Piazza di San Marco, Venice | 1734–35 | Sir John Soane's Museum, London, England |
| | Venice: the Grand Canal from Campo San Vio towards the Bacino | 1734–1760 | Wallace Collection, London, England |
| | Venice: the Grand Canal with Santa Maria della Salute towards the Riva degli Schiavoni | 1734–1762 | Wallace Collection, London, England |
| | Venice: the Grand Canal from the Palazzo Foscari to the Carità | 1734–1762 | Wallace Collection, London, England |
| | Campo San Rocco | circa 1735 | Private collection |
| | Piazza San Marco, Looking toward San Geminiano | circa 1735 | Galleria nazionale d'arte antica di palazzo Corsini, Rome |
| | The Molo, Venice | c. 1735 | Kimbell Art Museum, Fort Worth, Texas, United States |
| | View of the Piazzetta San Marco Looking South | c. 1735 | Indianapolis Museum of Art, Indianapolis, Indiana, United States |
| | Venice: A Regatta on the Grand Canal | 1735 | National Gallery, London, England |
| | The Rialto Bridge from the South | 1735 | Galleria Nazionale d'Arte Antica di Palazzo Corsini, Italy |
| | The Feast Day of Saint Roch | 1735 | National Gallery |
| | View of the Bacino di San Marco in Venice | 1735 | Städel Museum, Germany |
| | The Quay of the Dogana | mid 1730s | Private collection |
| | View of Campo Santa Maria Formosa | mid 1730s | Private collection |
| | The Entrance to the Canal Grande at the Punta della Dogana and the Santa Maria della Salute Woburn | mid 1730s | Private collection, Woburn Abbey |
| | Grand Canal looking East from Palazzo Bembo to Palazzo Vendramin-Calergi Woburn | mid 1730s | Private collection |
| | Piazza di San Marco, looking towards the Church of San Geminiano Woburn | mid 1730s | Woburn Abbey |
| | View of San Zaccaria | mid 1730s | Private Collection |
| | View of the Santi Giovanni e Paolo and the Equestrian Statue of Bartolomeo Colleoni | 1735–1738 | Private collection |
| | The Brenta Canal at Padua | 1735–40 | National Gallery of Art, London, England |
| | Entrance to the Grand Canal – from the West End of the Molo | 1735–40 | National Gallery of Art, Washington DC |
| | Venice the Bacino di San Marco from San Giorgio Maggiore | 1735–1744 | Wallace Collection, London, England |
| | View of the Riva degli Schiavoni | 1736 | Sir John Soane's Museum, London, England |
| | The Grand Canal at the Salute Church | c. 1736–38 | Munich Old Pinacoteca |
| | Venezia, campo Santi Giovanni e Paolo | c. 1736–40 | Royal Collection |
| | St. Mark's and the Clock Tower, Venice | c. 1737 | National Gallery of Canada, Ottawa, Canada |
| | The Grand Canal in Venice from Palazzo Flangini to Campo San Marcuola | c. 1738 | The J. Paul Getty Museum, Los Angeles |
| | Il Ritorno del Bucintoro al molo nel giorno dell'Ascensione | c. 1738 | Holkham Hall, England |
| | Il Canal Grande dalla chiesa di Santa Maria di Nazareth | 1738 | Pinacoteca Giovanni e Marella Agnelli, Ialy |
| | The Grand Canal looking North-East from the Palazzo Dolfin-Manin to the Rialto Bridge | 1738–1739 | Private collection |
| | The Campo Santi Giovanni e Paolo, Venice, with the West End of the Church and the Scuola di San Marco | 1738–1739 | Private collection |
| | The St Mark's Square, Venice | 1738–1740 | Detroit Institute of Arts, Detroit, Michigan, United States |
| | Bacino di San Marco | 1738–1740 | Museum of Fine Arts, Boston, United States |
| | The Grand Canal at the Salute Church | 1738–1742 | Private Collection |
| | Il Bucintoro al molo nel giorno dell'Ascensione | c. 1740 | Pinacoteca Giovanni e Marella Agnelli, Turin, Italy |
| | View of Piazza San Marco in Venice | c. 1740 | Musée Jacquemart André, Paris, France |
| | The Rialto Bridge in Venice | c. 1740 | Musée Jacquemart André, Paris, France |
| | View of Mestre: alle Barche | c. 1740 | Fondation Bemberg, Toulouse, France |
| | View of Dolo | c. 1740 | Fondation Bemberg, Toulouse, France |
| | The Molo with the Library and the Entrance to the Grand Canal | c. 1740 | Private collection |
| | The Church of the Redentore, Venice | c. 1740 | Manchester Art Gallery |
| | The Piazzetta | 1740s | Galleria Nazionale d'Arte Antica, Rome, Italy |
| | The Piazzetta | 1740s | Galleria Nazionale d'Arte Antica, Rome, Italy |
| | View of San Giuseppe di Castello | 1740s | Private Collection |
| | A Palladian Design for the Rialto Bridge, with Buildings at Vicenza | 1740s | Galleria nazionale di Parma, Italy |
| | Venice: The Campo SS. Giovanni e Paolo | 1740 | Royal Collection, Windsor Castle, England |
| | Bemberg Fondation Toulouse | 1740 | Fondation Bemberg, France |
| | Regatta on the Canale Grande | 1740 | Royal Collection, National Gallery de London, England |
| | Venice The Basin of San Marco on Ascension Day | 1740 | National Gallery, London, England |
| | Venice: Santa Maria della Salute | 1740 | Metropolitan Museum of Art, New York City, United States |
| | A Regatta on the Grand Canal | 1740 | National Gallery, London, England |
| | Giovanni Antonio Canal, il Canaletto - Capriccio - The Grand Canal, with an Imaginary Rialto Bridge and Other Buildings | 1740 | Galleria nazionale di Parma |
| | Venice. The Grand Canal with San Simeone Piccolo (1) | 1740 | The Wallace Collection, Manchester Square, England |
| | The Grand Canal with San Simeone Piccolo (2) | 1740 | National Gallery of London |
| | The Molo with the Library and the Entrance to the Grand Canal | 1740 | Private collection |
| | The Porta Portello with the Brenta Canal in Padua | 1740–43 | Albertina, Vienna, Austria |
| | The portico with a lantern | 1740–43 | Art Gallery of South Australia |
| | Venice. The Molo with Santa Maria della Salute | 1740–1745 | Wallace Collection, London, England Salute |
| | Interior of St Marks | 1740–1745 | Montreal Museum of Fine Arts, Canada |
| | Venice: the Riva degli Schiavoni | 1740–1745 | Wallace Collection, London, England |
| | The Piazza del Campidoglio and the Cordonata | 1740–1745 | Private collection |
| | View of the Grand Canal looking toward the Punta della Dogana from Campo Sant'Ivo | c. 1740-1745 | Pinacoteca di Brera, Milan, Italy |
| | Bacino di San Marco from the Puntana della Dogana | c. 1740-1745 | Pinacoteca di Brera, Milan, Italy |
| | View of the Grand Canal from Campo San Vio | 1740–1750 | Ca' Rezzonico, Venice, Italy |
| | Venice: the Grand Canal from the Palazzo Foscari to the Carità | 1740–1750 | Wallace Collection, London, England |
| | Venice: the Grand Canal from the Palazzo Flangini to San Marcuola (1) | 1740–1750 | Wallace Collection, London, England |
| | The Grand Canal from the Palazzo Flangini to San Marcuola (2) | 1740–1750 | Wallace Collection |
| | San Marco | 1740–1750 | Arp Museum Bahnhof Rolandseck, Germany |
| | Venice: the Canale di Santa Chiara | 1740–1750 | Wallace Collection, London, England |
| | Venice the Grand Canal from the Palazzo Dolfin-Manin to the Rialto Bridge | 1740–1750 | Wallace Collection, London, England |
| | Venice the Dogana and Santa Maria della Salute from the Molo | 1740–1760 | Wallace Collection, London, England |
| | The Prà della Valle in Padua | 1741–1746 | Museo Poldi Pezzoli, Milan, Italy |
| | The Porta Portello Padua | 1741–42 | National Gallery of Art, Washington D.C., United States |
| | Il molo verso la riva degli schiavoni con la colonna di san marco, ante 1742 (1) | before 1742 | |
| | Il molo verso la riva degli schiavoni con la colonna di san marco, ante 1742 (2) | before 1742 | |
| | Il molo verso la riva degli schiavoni con la colonna di san marco, ante 1742 (3) | before 1742 | |
| | Il molo verso la riva degli schiavoni con la colonna di san marco, ante 1742 (4) | before 1742 | |
| | Rome: The Arch of Constantine | 1742 | Royal Collection, Windsor Castle, England |
| | Rome: The Arch of Septimius Severus | 1742 | Royal Collection, Windsor Castle, England |
| | Rome: The Arch of Titus | 1742 | Royal Collection, Windsor Castle, England |
| | Rome- Ruins of the Forum, Looking towards the Capitol | 1742 | Royal Collection, Windsor Castle, England |
| | Rome: The Pantheon | 1742 | Royal Collection, Windsor Castle, England |
| | The Square of Saint Mark's, Venice | 1742–1744 | National Gallery of Art, Washington D.C., United States |
| | Entrance to the Grand Canal from the Molo, Venice | 1742–1744 | National Gallery of Art, Washington D.C., United States |
| | Entrance to the Grand Canal; Looking East | 1742–1744 | Windsor Castle, England |
| | The Piazza San Marco, Venice | 1742–1746 | Art Gallery of New South Wales, Australia |
| | The Thames at Westminster | 1742–54 | Penrhyn Castle, Gales |
| | Rome: View of the Colosseum and the Arch of Constantine | 1743 | Royal Collection, Windsor Castle, England |
| | The Horses of San Marco in the Piazzetta | 1743 | Royal Collection, Windsor Castle, England |
| | Venice The Piazzetta Towards The Torre dell' Orologio | 1743 | Royal Collection Trust, United Kingtom |
| | Venice The Molo with the Prisons and the Doges' Palace | 1743 | Royal Collection Trust, United Kingtom |
| | An Island in the Lagoon with a Gateway and a Church | 1743–44 | Saint Louis Art Museum, United States |
| | Entrance to the Grand Canal; Looking East | 1744 | Royal Collection at Windsor Castle |
| | The Colleoni Monument in a Caprice Setting | 1744 | Royal Collection |
| | View of a River, Perhaps in Padua | 1745 | Private collection |
| | Looking North, the Campanile under Repair | 1745 | Royal Collection at Windsor Castle |
| | The Basilica of Maxentius and the Church of Santa Francesca Romana | 1745 | Galleria Borghese, Roma |
| | The Bucintoro | 1745–1750 | Thyssen-Bornemisza Museum, Madrid, Spain |
| | Old Somerset House from the River Thames | 1745–1750 | Private collection Simon C. Dickinson Ltd. |
| | Capriccio of the Rialto Bridge with the Lagoon Beyond | 1746 | Private collection |
| | London and the River Thames looking towards Westminster | 1746-7 | |
| | London and the River Westminster | 1746-7 | |
| | The River Thames with St. Paul's Cathedral on Lord Mayor's Day | 1746–47 | Lobkowicz Palace, Prague, Czech Republic |
| | London Seen Through an Arch of Westminster Bridge | 1746–47 | Syon House, London |
| | The City of Westminster from River Thames near the York Water Gate | 1746–49 | Private Collection (owned by Dukes of Grafton) |
| | Ruins with Figures | 1747 | Fitzwilliam Museum, Cambridge, England |
| | Windsor Castle | 1747 | Collection of the Duke of Northumberland |
| | Santi Giovanni e Paolo and the Scuola di San Marco | 1747 | Gemäldegalerie Alte Meister |
| | Westminster Bridge, with the Lord Mayor's Procession on the Thames | 1747 | Yale Center for British Art |
| | The Thames and the City of London from Richmond House (detail) | 1747 | Private Collection |
| | London: River Thames looking towards Westminster from Lambeth | 1747 | Lobkowicz Palace, Prague, Czech Republic |
| | Whitehall and the Privy Garden from Richmond House | 1747 | Goodwood House, UK |
| | London | 1747 | Goodwood House, UK |
| | Westminster Bridge from the North on Lord Mayor's Day | 1747 | Yale Center for British Art, University of Yale, US |
| | Westminster Bridge Under Construction from the South-East Abutment | 1747 | Private collection Duke of Northumberland |
| | London, Whitehall and the Privy Garden looking North Buccleuch | 1747 | Private Collection, the Buccleuch Living Heritage Trust |
| | The Molo from the Basin of San Marco, Venice | 1747–1750 | San Diego Museum of Art, San Diego, California |
| | Venice, a view of the Churches of the Redentore and San Giacomo, with a moored Man-of-war, Gondolas and Barges | 1747–1755 | Private collection |
| | The South Façade of Warwick Castle | 1748 | Thyssen-Bornemisza Museum, Madrid, Spain |
| | The City of London from the River Thames with St. Paul's Cathedral | 1748 | Lobkowicz Palace, Prague, Czech Republic |
| | Badminton House, Gloucestershire | 1748 | Private Collection |
| | Warwick Castle | 1748–49 | Yale Center for British Art, New Haven, United States |
| | The Thames at Westminster, London | 1749 | Penrhyn Castle, National Trust, Gwynedd, Wales |
| | The Old Horse Guards from St James's Park | 1749 | Tate Britain |
| | London – the Old Horse Guards and Banqueting Hall, from St James's Park | 1749 | Private Collection |
| | Londra, la guardia di new horse da St. James Park | 1749 | |
| | Westminster Abbey with a Procession of the Knights of the Bath | 1749 | Westminster Abbey, London |
| | Syon House | 1749 | Private collection Duke of Northumberland |
| | A View of the Old Horse Guards and Banqueting Hall, from St James's Park | Probably 1749 | Private Collection |
| | The Prisons | probably late 1740s | Private collection |
| | Venice, The Church of San Giorgio Maggiore | Probably late 1740s | Private collection |
| | The Rialto Bridge and The Church of S. Giorgio Maggiore | c. 1750 | North Carolina Museum of Art, Raleigh, North Carolina, United States |
| | Capriccio with Ruins and Porta Portello, Padua | c. 1750 | Gallerie dell'Accademia, Venice, Italy |
| | The Thames from the Terrace of Somerset House, Looking toward Westminster | 1750 | Yale Center for British Art, New Haven, United States |
| | Bacino di S. Marco- From the Piazzetta | c. 1750 | National Gallery of Victoria, Australia |
| | Capriccio of the Scuola di San Marco from the Loggia of the Palazzo Grifalconi-Loredan | Early 1750s | Private collection |
| | Palazzo Vendramin-Calergi, on the Grand Canal, Venice | 1750s | Private collection |
| | Veduta del Palazzo Ducale di Venezia | 1750s | Galleria degli Uffizi, Florence |
| | Westminster Bridge from the North with the Lord Mayor's Procession | 1750 | Private Collection |
| | Cathedral San Paulo | 1750 | |
| | The Thames from the Terrace of Somerset House, Looking toward Westminster | 1750 | Yale University Art Gallery, New Haven, United States |
| | The Thames from the Terrace of Somerset House, Looking toward St. Paul's | 1750 | Yale Center for British Art, New Haven, United States |
| | London: The Thames from Somerset House Terrace towards Westminster | 1750–51 | Royal Collection, Windsor Castle, England |
| | Rome, The Piazza Navona | 1750–51 | Tokyo Fuji Art Museum, Japan |
| | Rome, The Piazza del Quirinale | 1750–51 | Tokyo Fuji Art Museum, Japan |
| | London: The Thames from Somerset House Terrace towards the City | 1750–51 | Royal Collection, Windsor Castle, England |
| | Veduta di Greenwich dal fiume | 1750–51 | |
| | Padua- The River Bacchiglione and the Porta Portello Day | 1750–1760 | Metropolitan Museum of Art, New York |
| | A View of Greenwich from the River | 1751 | Blickling Hall, National Trust, Norfolk, England |
| | The Grand Walk, Vauxhall Gardens | 1751 | Compton Verney Art Gallery, England |
| | Chelsea School, Rotonda, Ranelagh house and Tamesis river | 1751 | Museo Nacional de Bellas Artes, La Habana, Cuba |
| | Chelsea from the Thames at Battersea Reach | February 1751 | Tate Britain |
| | Alnwick Castle | 1752 | Alnwick Castle, Northumberland, England |
| | Greenwich Hospital from the North Bank of the Thames | c. 1752 | National Maritime Museum, Greenwich, London, England |
| | Warwick Castle, the East Front | 1752 | Birmingham Museum and Art Gallery, Birmingham, England |
| | Warwick Castle, the East Front from the Courtyard | 1752 | Birmingham Museum and Art Gallery, Birmingham, England |
| | Northumberland House | 1752 | Collection of the Duke of Northumberland |
| | Veduta di greenwich dal fiume | 1750–1752 | |
| | New Horse Guards from St James's Park | 1752–53 | Private collection |
| | Capriccio of a Renaissance Palazzo with a monumental Staircase, a Clock Tower and the Arch of Titus beyond | 1752–55 | Private collection, Arundel Castle |
| | London: Northumberland House | 1752–1763 | Wallace Collection, London, England |
| | The Interior of Henry VII's Chapel in Westminster Abbey | 1753 | Museum of London, London, England |
| | Capriccio of a Round Church with an Elaborate Gothic Portico in a Piazza, a Palladian Piazza and a Gothic Church Beyond | 1753–55 | Arundel Castle |
| | Capriccio of a Renaissance Triumphal Arch seen from the Portico of a Palace | 1753–55 | Arundel Castle |
| | English Landscape Capriccio with a Column | 1754 | National Gallery of Art, Washington D.C., United States |
| | View of Banqueting House and Equestrian Statue of King Charles I | 1754 | Private Collection |
| | Capriccio with a Domed Church and the Colleoni Monument | probably 1754 | Private collection |
| | English Landscape Capriccio with a Palace | 1754 | National Gallery of Art, Washington D.C., United States |
| | Westminster Bridge | 1754 | Private Collection |
| | Venice, Bacino di San Marco on Ascension Day | 1754 | Private Collection |
| | The Interior of the Rotunda, Ranelagh, London (1) | 1754 | Compton Verney Art Gallery, England |
| | Interior of the Rotunda at Ranelagh (2) | 1754 | National Gallery of London |
| | St. Paul's Cathedral | 1754 | Yale Center for British Art, New Haven, United States |
| | A View of Walton Bridge | 1754 | Dulwich Picture Gallery, London, England |
| | Eton College | 1754 | National Gallery, London, England |
| | Palazzo Ducale and the Piazza di San Marco | c. 1755 | Galleria degli Uffizi, Florence |
| | Old Walton Bridge | 1755 | Yale Center for British Art, New Haven, United States |
| | San Marco – the Interior | 1755 | Windsor Castle |
| | Piazza San Marco – Looking South-West | 1755–59 | Wadsworth Atheneum Museum of Art, Connecticut, United States |
| | Saint Mark's Square, Venice | c. 1756 | National Gallery of Ireland |
| | Interior Court of the Doge's Palace, Venice | c. 1756 | Fitzwilliam Museum, Cambridge, England |
| | Piazza San Marco – Looking East from the South- West Corner | 1756 | National Gallery, London, England |
| | Saint Mark's, Venice | c. 1756 | Fitzwilliam Museum, Cambridge, England |
| | Venice: Palazzo Grimani | 1756–58 | National Gallery, London, England |
| | Piazza San Marco Looking East from the North-West Corner | 1758 | National Gallery, London, England |
| | Le grand canal – Looking South-East from the Campo Santa Sophia to the Rialto Bridge, Anagoria, Venice (Gemäldegalerie, Berlin) | 1758–63 | Gemäldegalerie de Berlín and Prussian Cultural Heritage Foundation |
| | The Campo di Rialto | 1758–63 | Gemäldegalerie der Staatlichen Museen zu Berlin |
| | The Campo di Rialto and S. Giacomo di Rialto, Venice | 1760 | National Gallery of Canada, Ottawa, Canada |
| | The Bucintoro at the Molo on Ascension Day | 1760 | Dulwich Picture Gallery, London, England |
| | Porta Portello, Padua | 1760 | Thyssen-Bornemisza Museum, Madrid, Spain |
| | The Bucintoro at the Molo on Ascension Day | 1760 | Dulwich Picture Gallery, London, England |
| | View through a Baroque Colonnade into a Garden | 1760–1768 | Albertina, Austria |
| | The Doge and Grand Council in Sala del Maggior Consiglio | 1763 | Statens Museum for Kunst, Dinamarca |
| | Doge of Venice Departing for the Lido | 1763–67 | British Museum, London |
| | Santa Maria Zobenigo | c. 1765 | Private Collection |
| | Scala dei Giganti | c. 1765 | Private Collection |
| | Perspective with a Portico | 1765 | Gallerie dell'Accademia, Venice, Italy |
| | Capriccio with Colonnade in the Interior of a Palace | 1765 | Thyssen-Bornemisza Museum, Madrid, Spain |
| | The School of San Marco | 1765 | Thyssen-Bornemisza Museum, Madrid, Spain |
| | San Marco – the Crossing and North Transept, with Musicians Singing | 1766 | Kunsthalle Hamburg, Germany |
| | Vue de Mestre Bemberg | before 1768 | Fondation Bemberg, France |
| | Vue de Dolo Bemberg | before 1768 | Fondation Bemberg, France |
| | Teilansicht der Piazza San Marco in Venedig | 1768 | |
