= The Arch of Septimius Severus =

Painting by Canaletto

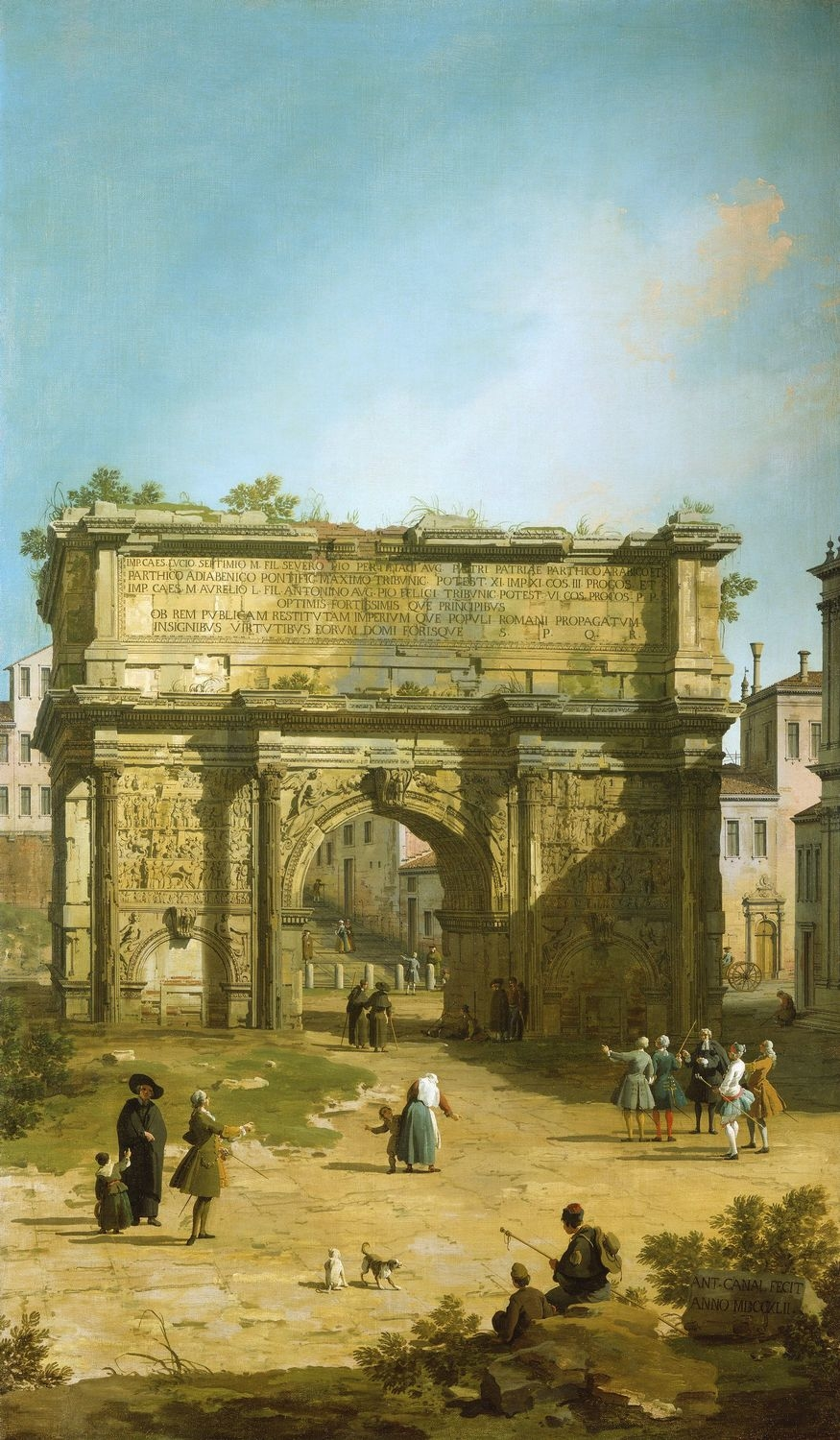
- Artist: Canaletto
- Year: 1742
- Type: Oil on canvas, landscape painting
- Dimensions: 180.7 cm × 105.9 cm (71.1 in × 41.7 in)
- Location: Royal Collection; London

The Arch of Septimius Severus is a 1742 landscape painting by the Italian artist Canaletto. It depicts the Arch of Septimius Severus, a triumphal arch in Rome. Constructed in the Roman Forum during the early third century to celebrate victories of the Roman Empire in the Parthian Wars. Canaletto portrays the intricate inscription and carvings on the white marble arch, with a shadow from the church of Santi Luca e Martina on the right falling on it.

It was one of five vertical views of Rome produced by the artist. Although Canaletto is known for his views of Venice, he also produced scenes of other locations including Rome and England. The painting was based on a sketch that Canaletto had produced in 1720, altered slightly make it a vertical view including the surrounding buildings. It was acquired by George III from the British consul in Venice Joseph Smith in 1762 and hung at Buckingham House. It remains in the Royal Collection. Another version of the scene is in the Cincinnati Art Museum in Ohio.

== See also ==
- List of paintings by Canaletto

== Bibliography ==
- Baetjer, Katharine. Canaletto. Metropolitan Museum of Art, 1989.
- Lloyd, Christopher. The Paintings in the Royal Collection: A Thematic Exploration. Royal Collection, 1999.
- Spike, John T. Italian Paintings in the Cincinnati Art Museum. Cincinnati Art Museum, 1993.
