= The Grand Canal in Venice from Palazzo Flangini to Campo San Marcuola =

Painting by Canaletto

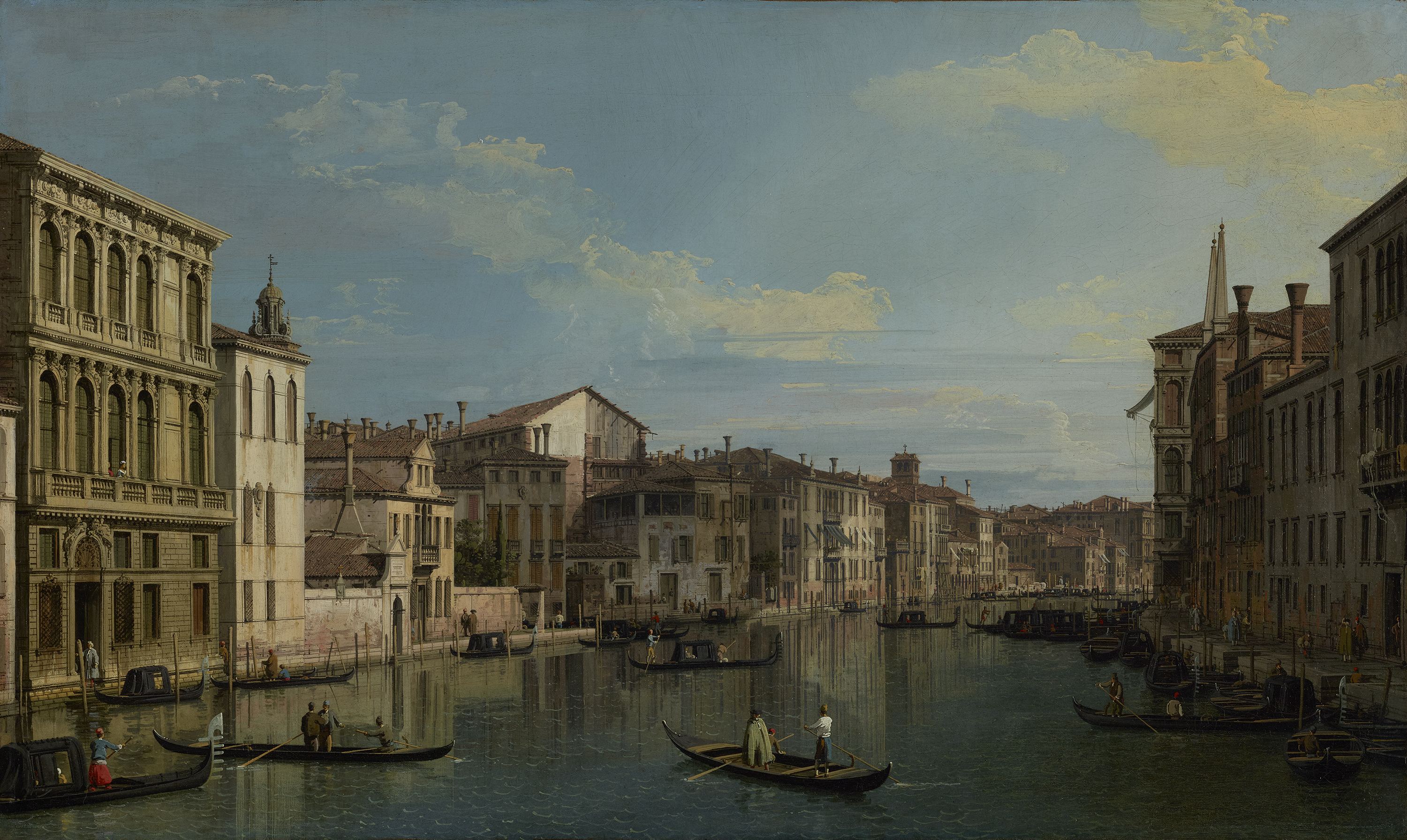
- Artist: Canaletto (Giovanni Antonio Canal)
- Year: about 1738
- Catalogue: 2013.22
- Medium: Oil on canvas
- Dimensions: 47 cm × 78 cm (18 1/2 in × 30 3/4 in)
- Location: J. Paul Getty Museum, Los Angeles, California

The Grand Canal in Venice from Palazzo Flangini to Campo San Marcuola is a painting by the Italian artist Canaletto in the J. Paul Getty Museum in Los Angeles, California. Painted around 1738, it may have been commissioned by the English merchant and art collector Joseph Smith (1682–1770).

== Description ==
The composition depicts the upper reaches of the Grand Canal near the entrance to the Cannaregio Canal. It is a typical example of the vedute paintings popular with Grand Tour travelers as a visual record of their stay in Venice.

The viewer's vantage point is in the middle of the canal, surrounded by gondolas, barges, and the buildings lining the banks. Many of the structures depicted by Canaletto still stand today, for example Palazzo Flangini, the building at far left, which retains its off-center entrance portal. To the right of the palace, the lantern on the dome of the church of San Geremia is visible, followed by the gabled canonica (rectory) of San Geremia. The trees appearing over a garden wall mark the corner of the Grand Canal and the Cannaregio Canal, which branches off to the left. The garden belongs to Palazzo Labia, the first building on the Cannaregio Canal, adjacent to San Geremia but hidden from view in the painting. The very last building visible in the background of the painting is Palazzo Vendramin Calergi, partly cut off due to the canal's curve to the right.

The painting also records the traghetto, a ferry service using row boats that was the primary means of crossing the Grand Canal prior to the construction of most of the bridges that span it today. One such boat is seen departing from the Riva di Biasio in the foreground at right, while another is prominently shown in the middle of the canal.

== Related works ==
Later versions of this composition are in the Minneapolis Institute of Arts, Grand Canal from Palazzo Flangini to Palazzo Bembo, about 1740, and the Wallace Collection, London, Venice: the Grand Canal from the Palazzo Flangini to San Marcuola, about 1740–1750.

Canaletto's nephew Bernardo Bellotto painted an enlarged replica with minor variations around 1740–41. The painting was engraved by Antonio Visentini for the second edition of Venetian views after Canaletto, published in 1742.

== See also ==
- List of works by Canaletto
