= The Bucintoro at the Molo on Ascension Day =

1760 Painting by Canaletto

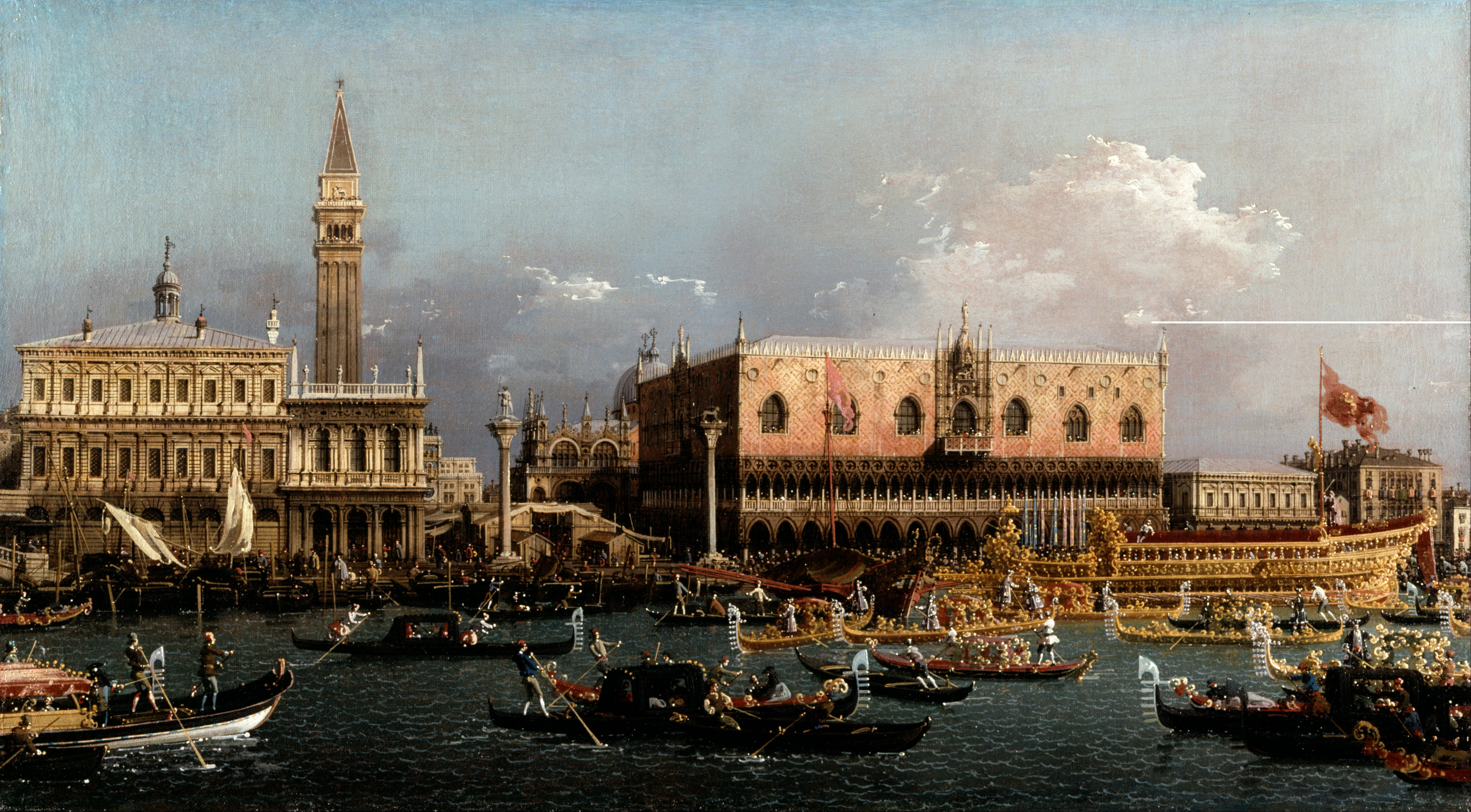
- Artist: Canaletto
- Year: 1760
- Type: Oil on canvas
- Dimensions: 58.3 cm × 101.8 cm (23.0 in × 40.1 in)
- Location: Dulwich Picture Gallery; London

The Bucintoro at the Molo on Ascension Day is a 1760 landscape painting by the Italian artist Canaletto. It features a view of his native Venice with the bucintoro, the ceremonial barge of the Doge. Each year the Doge sailed out into the Adriatic Sea for the Marriage of the Sea ceremonyThe bucintoro is shown having returned and is now docking at the mole near the Piazza San Marco.

After a nine year stay in Britain Canaletto returned to Venice in 1755. He produced this picture during the final spell of his career when he struggled for recognition in his native republic compared to the acclaim he enjoyed abroad. Today the painting is in the Dulwich Picture Gallery in London having been acquired through a gift from Henry Yates Thompson in 1919.

Depictions of the Bucintoro were a recurring theme in the works of Canaletto and he produced various compositions showing it from different angles. The earliest was that which he produced for the British Prime Minister Sir Robert Walpole in 1731. That version was auctioned by Christie's for £31.94 million in 2025

== Bibliography ==
- Links, J.G. Canaletto, the Complete Paintings. Granada, 1981
- Steadman, Philip. Canaletto's Camera. UCL Press, 2025.

== See also ==
- List of paintings by Canaletto
