= Westminster Abbey with a Procession of the Knights of the Bath =

Painting by Canaletto

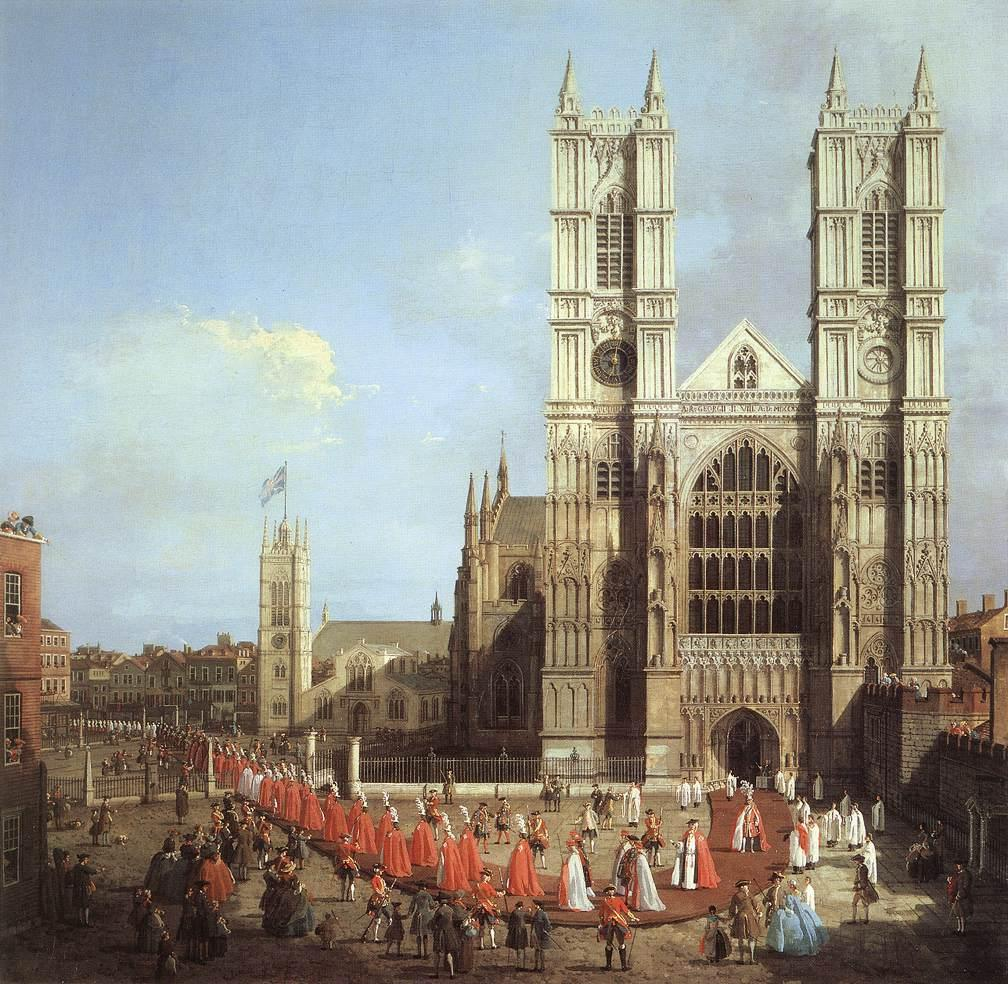
Westminster Abbey with a Procession of the Knights of the Bath (1749) by Canaletto

Westminster Abbey with a Procession of the Knights of the Bath is a painting created in 1749 by the Italian artist Canaletto depicting the Knights of the Bath at Westminster Abbey. In 2020 the painting went on public display at the Abbey the first time since its 1792 commission as part of an exhibition at the Abbey's Queen's Diamond Jubilee Galleries. The painting typically hangs in the residence of the Dean of Westminster Abbey.

== See also ==
- List of works by Canaletto
