= Old Horse Guards =

Painting by Canaletto

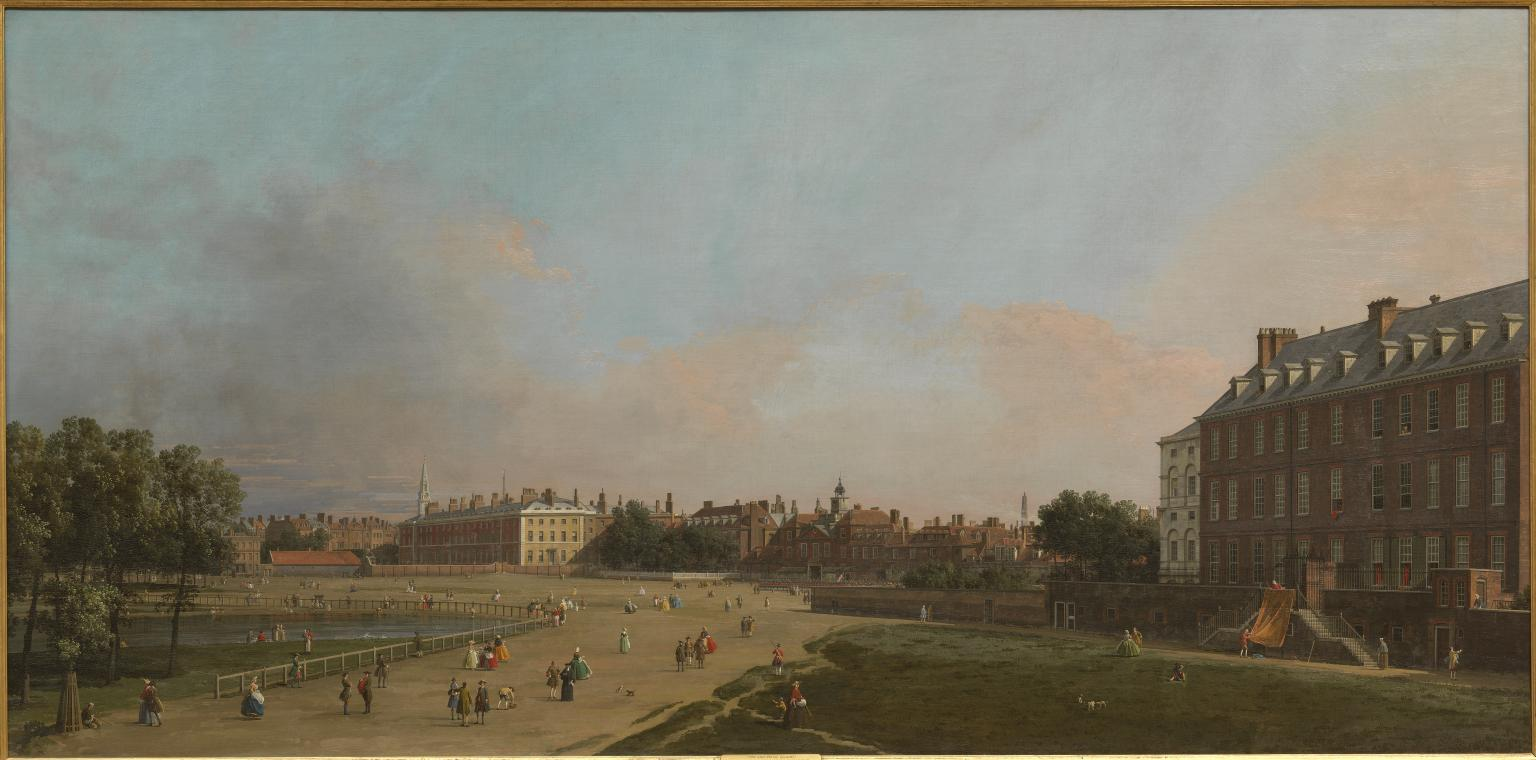
- Artist: Canaletto
- Year: 1749
- Type: Oil on canvas
- Dimensions: 48.7 cm × 76.4 cm (19.2 in × 30.1 in)
- Location: Tate Britain, London

Old Horse Guards is a 1749 landscape painting by the Italian artist Canaletto. It depicts the view from St James's Park of the Horse Guards building in London. Built during the reign of Charles II it served as the headquarters of the British Army. At the time he painted it the existing building was due to be pulled down and replaced by the larger building designed by William Kent that still stands today. The painting offers a wider view of Whitehall in the mid-eighteenth century. On the right of the picture is the rear of Downing Street. It is also known by the longer title The Old Horse Guards from St James's Park.

Canaletto, best known for his paintings of his native Venice, had come to England in 1746, and painted a number of London scenes. While he usually painted by commission, he produced this work speculatively – possibly as he hoped a wealthy resident of Downing Street would purchase it. He displayed the painting to prospective buyers in his Soho lodgings.

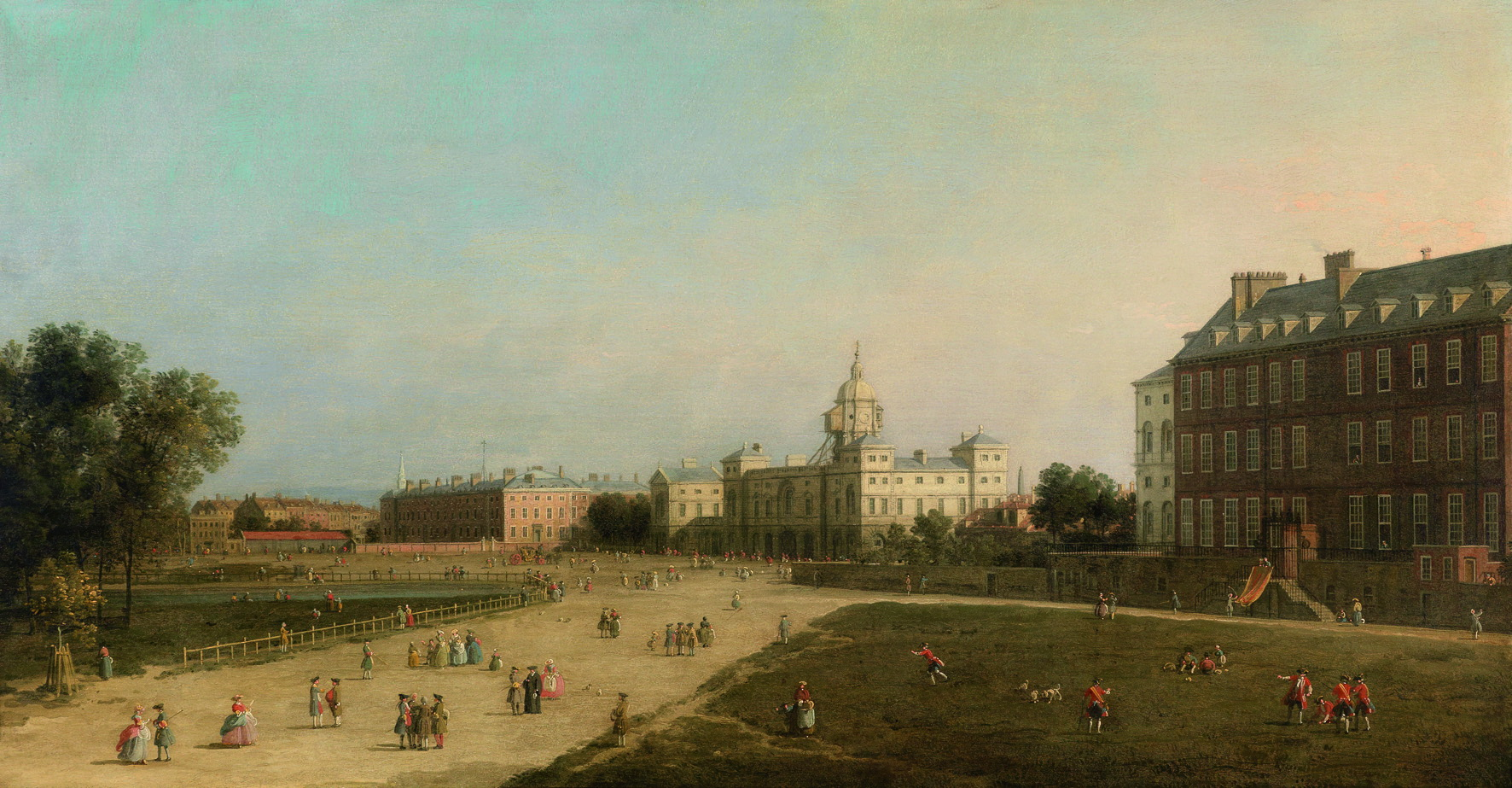
New Horse Guards by Canaletto, c.1753

It is now in the collection of Tate Britain, on a long-term loan from the Andrew Lloyd Webber Foundation. It hangs in the Pimlico gallery a short distance away from the artist's New Horse Guards, painted a few years later and showing the replacement building under construction.

== Bibliography ==
- Liversidge, M.J.H. & Farrington, Jane. Canaletto & England. Merrel Holberton, 1993.
- Kowalczyk, Bożena Anna . Canaletto, 1697–1768. Silvana Editoriale, 2018.
- Uzanne, Octave. Canaletto. Parkstone International, 2023.

== See also ==
- List of paintings by Canaletto
