= The Grand Canal with San Simeone Piccolo =

Painting by Canaletto

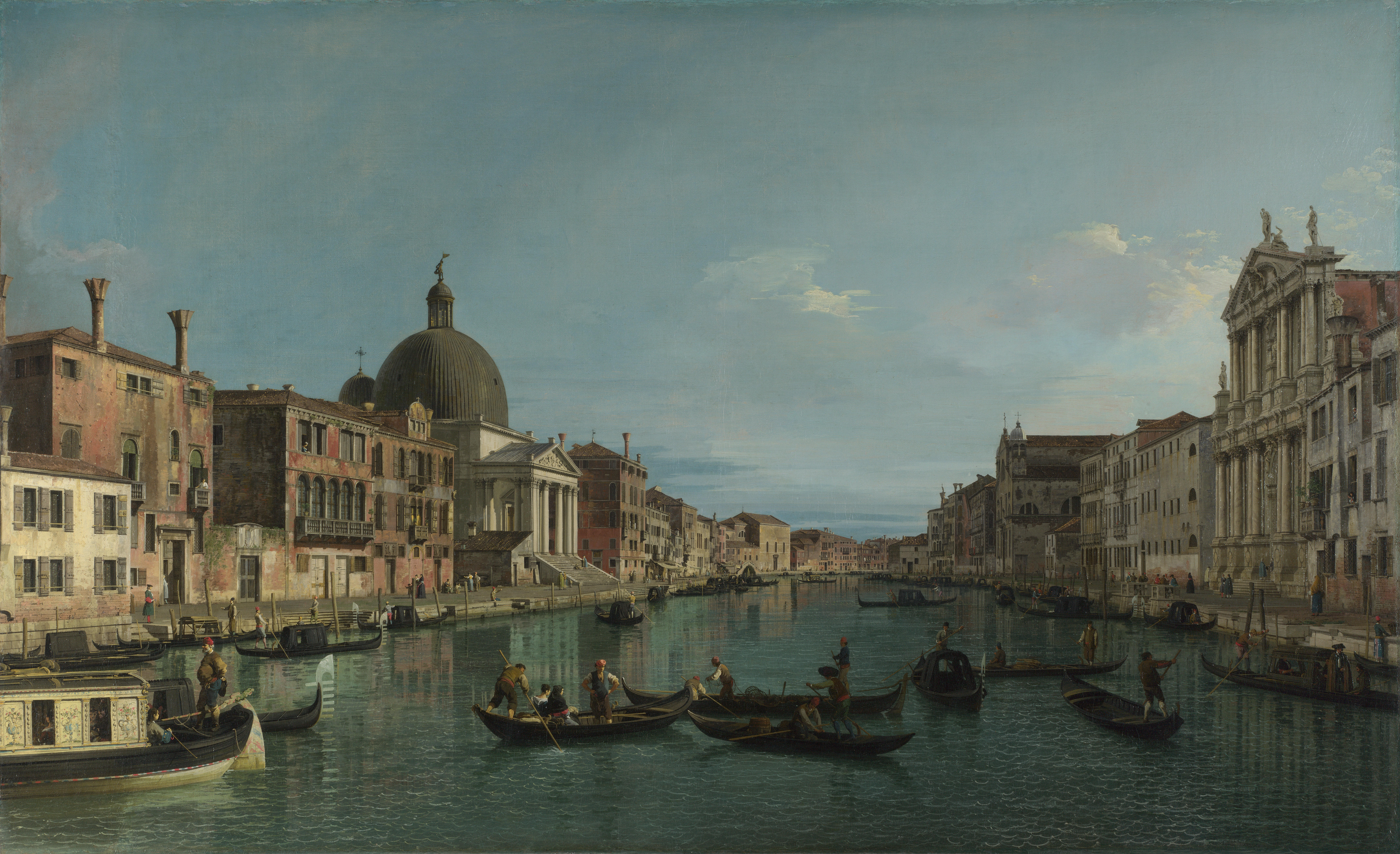
- Artist: Canaletto
- Year: c.1740
- Type: Oil on canvas, landscape painting
- Dimensions: 124.5 cm × 204.6 cm (49.0 in × 80.6 in)
- Location: National Gallery, London

The Grand Canal with San Simeone Piccolo is a c.1740 landscape painting by the Italian artist Canaletto. Portraying a veduta of his native Venice, it depicts a view along the Grand Canal with the dome of San Simeone Piccolo prominent on the left and the Scalzi on the right. In the foreground fisherman are at work, with a gondola carrying two female passengers about to collide with their boat. The view was radically altered in the nineteenth century to construct the Venezia Santa Lucia railway station.

Today the painting is in the collection of the National Gallery in London, as part of the bequest of Lord Farnborough in 1838. A view of the same area but looking the opposite direction down the Canal by Canaletto's nephew and pupil Bernardo Bellotto is in the Wallace Collection.

== See also ==
- List of paintings by Canaletto

== Bibliography ==
- Levey, Michael. A Room-to-Room Guide to the National Gallery. National Gallery Publications, 1972.
- Packer, Leila & Beddington, Charles. Canaletto and Guardi: Views of Venice at the Wallace Collection. Batsford Books, 2025.
