= The Stonemason's Yard =

Painting by Canaletto

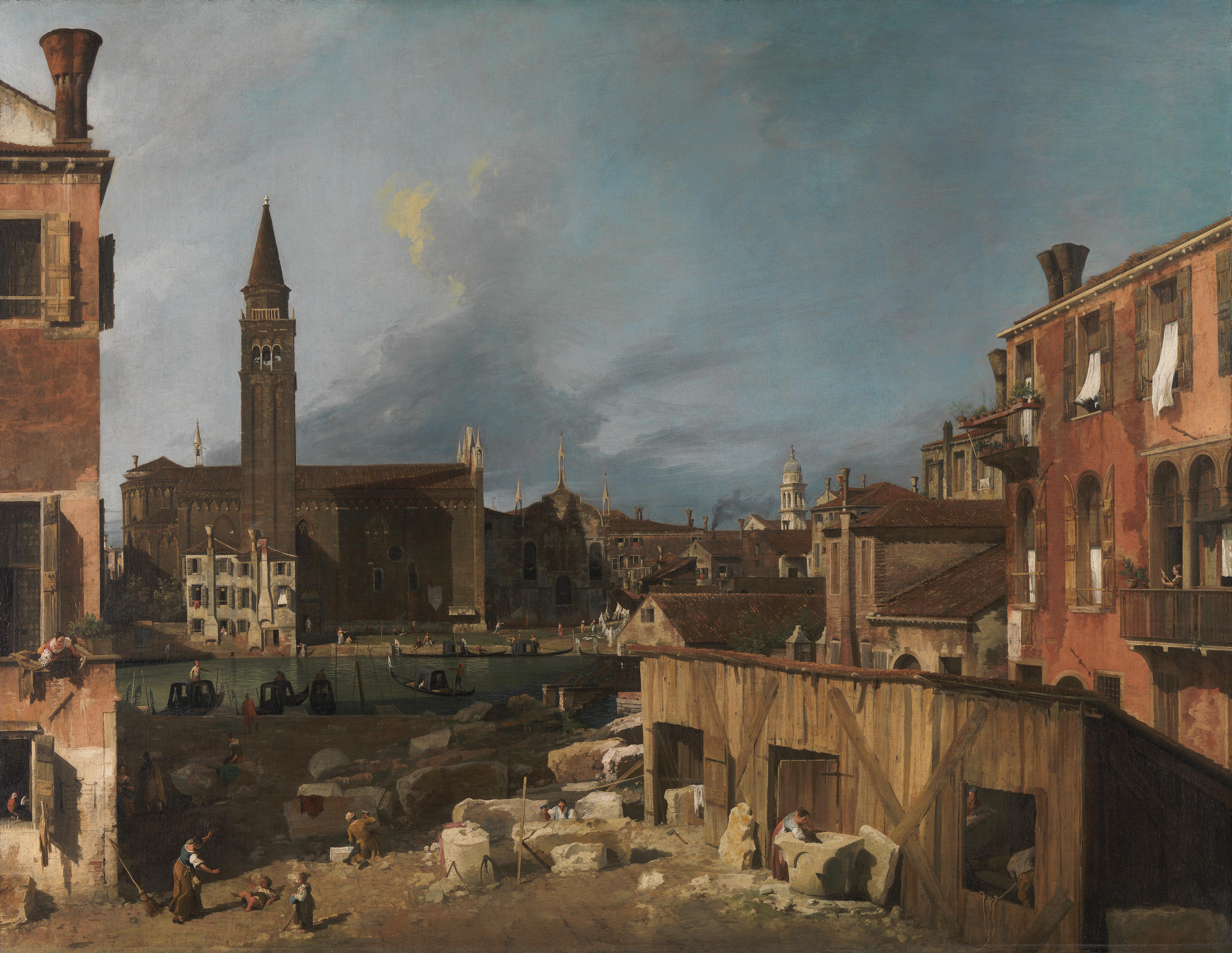
- Artist: Canaletto
- Year: c. 1725
- Medium: Oil on canvas
- Dimensions: 124 cm × 163 cm (49 in × 64 in)
- Location: National Gallery, London

The Stonemason's Yard (formally known as Campo S. Vidal and Santa Maria della Carità) is an early oil painting by Giovanni Antonio Canal, better known as Canaletto. It depicts an informal scene in Venice, looking over a temporary stonemason's yard in the Campo San Vidal set up for the construction of Andrea Tirali's facade of the church of San Vidal, and across the Grand Canal towards the church of Santa Maria della Carità. Painted in the mid to late 1720s, it is now in the collection of the National Gallery in London and is considered one of Canaletto's finest works.

== Description ==
The painting measures 123.8 by 162.9 centimetres (48.7 in × 64.1 in). It depicts a Venetian scene looking roughly southwest over a temporary stonemason's yard situated in an open space beside the Grand Canal known as the Campo San Vidal ("campo", literally field, used in Venice to denote a small open space). Several masons are at work shaping and carving stone probably destined for the reconstruction of the nearby church of San Vidal (immediately behind the viewer and so not visible in the painting; its Palladian façade was renovated in the 1730s) or possibly for the embellishment of a nearby palazzo (the Palazzo Cavalli-Franchetti and Palazzo Barbaro are close by, to the viewer's left). The side of the medieval church of Santa Maria della Carità, reconstructed in the 1440s, stands on the opposite bank of the Grand Canal, to the left of the façade of the Scuola Grande della Carità; the tower of the church of San Trovaso is visible rising over the rooftops in the distance.

In addition to the architectural details, The Stonemason's Yard shows scenes of daily life in Venice, probably in the early morning: a cock crows on a windowsill to the lower left, and sunlight streams in from the left behind the viewer (east). The mainly domestic buildings are generally in poor repair, with typical Venetian flared chimney-pots. Laundry hangs from many of the windows, and potted plants stand on several balconies. One woman is using a distaff and drop spindle to spin thread on a balcony to the right; another draws water from a well in the campo beside a wooden shed, from a well-head shaped like the capital of a column. Two children are playing in the foreground to the left: one is falling over and urinating involuntarily in surprise, as a woman lunges forward to catch him; another woman looks down from a balcony above. A gondola with canopied cabin passes on the canal, with others moored on either bank.

Unsigned and undated, the painting is attributed and dated by stylistic clues. It seems to combine features of Canaletto's early and mature styles, for example in the use of two undercolours, and is a very early example the use of Prussian blue in oil painting. Canaletto painted The Stonemason's Yard before 1730 while Prussian blue was discovered by Johann Jacob Diesbach in 1704. Amongst other pigments used by Canaletto in this painting were Naples yellow, lead white and ochres.

The informal scene is thought to have been painted for a Venetian patron, rather than a foreign visitor to Venice, in the mid- to late 1720s. Unlike many views painted by Canaletto and his fellow vedutisti, the location has changed significantly since the 1720s. The view of the opposite bank of the Grand Canal is now blocked by the high arch of the modern wooden Accademia bridge, and the church of the Carità has been much altered. The campanile fell down in 1744, demolishing the houses beside the canal in front, and much of the other stonework has been removed. The nave became the Accademia di Belle Arti di Venezia in the 1800s, and the Gallerie dell'Accademia is housed in the Scuola. The Campo remains an open space, with the well-head at its centre. The domestic building to the right remains standing.

== Provenance ==
The early ownership of The Stonemason's Yard is not known. It was in the collection of Sir George Beaumont by 1808, and was one of the paintings Beaumont donated to the British Museum in 1823, to form the nucleus of the National Gallery's nascent collection. It passed to the National Gallery in 1828, where it continues to be exhibited. It was extensively cleaned by John Seguier in 1852 – so extensively that a Select Committee investigated the cleaning practices of the National Gallery – and was cleaned again in 1955, and then restored, relined and remounted in 1989. Some early retouchings, clouds now concealed under later glazings, may have been done in Beaumont's time by John Constable.

== See also ==
- List of works by Canaletto
