= Syon House (painting) =

Painting by Canaletto

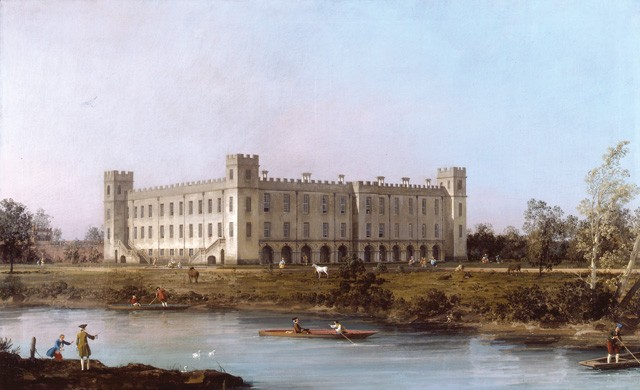
- Artist: Canaletto
- Year: 1749
- Type: Oil on canvas, landscape painting
- Dimensions: 85.3 cm × 138.5 cm (33.6 in × 54.5 in)
- Location: Alnwick Castle; Northumberland

Syon House is a 1749 landscape painting by the Italian artist Canaletto. It features a view of Syon House on the River Thames near Brentford. Syon was the country estate owned by the future Duke of Northumberland. Then located some way to the western outskirts of the capital, Syon is now in Greater London.

Due to the War of the Austrian Succession Canaletto, known for his cityscapes of his native Venice, relocated to Britain to be closer to his patrons particularly the Duke of Bedford. Northumberland, another prominent aristocrat of the mid-Georgian era, commissioned eight paintings from Canaletto. Today the painting remains in the Northumberland collection and is on display at the family seat of Alnwick Castle.

== See also ==
- List of paintings by Canaletto

== Bibliography ==
- Baetjer, Katharine & Links, J. G. Canaletto. Metropolitan Museum of Art, 1989.
- Farrington, Jane. Canaletto & England. Merrel Holberton, 1993.
- Links, J.G. Canaletto, the Complete Paintings. Granada, 1981.
