= Greenwich Hospital from the North Bank of the Thames =

Painting by Canaletto

- Artist: Canaletto
- Year: c.1750
- Type: Oil on canvas, landscape painting
- Dimensions: 68.6 cm × 106.7 cm (27.0 in × 42.0 in)
- Location: National Maritime Museum; London

Greenwich Hospital from the North Bank of the Thames is a c.1750 landscape painting by the Italian artist Canaletto. It depicts a view of Greenwich Hospital seen from across the River Thames from the a viewpoint on the Isle of Dogs. The Inigo Jones-designed Queen's House is in the centre of the painting with the Royal Observatory also visible on the hill in Greenwich Park. It may have been produced for the art collector and British consul in Venice Joseph Smith for his residence on the Grand Canal. Canaletto also produced two other views of Greenwich Hospital. Today the painting is in the collection of the National Maritime Museum in Greenwich.

== See also ==
- List of paintings by Canaletto

== Bibliography ==
- Baetjer, Katharine & Links, J. G. Canaletto. Metropolitan Museum of Art, 1989.
- Baker, Christopher. Canaletto: Colour Library. Phaidon Press, 1994.
- Uzanne, Octave. Canaletto. Parkstone International, 2023.
