= The Feast Day of Saint Roch =

Painting by Canaletto

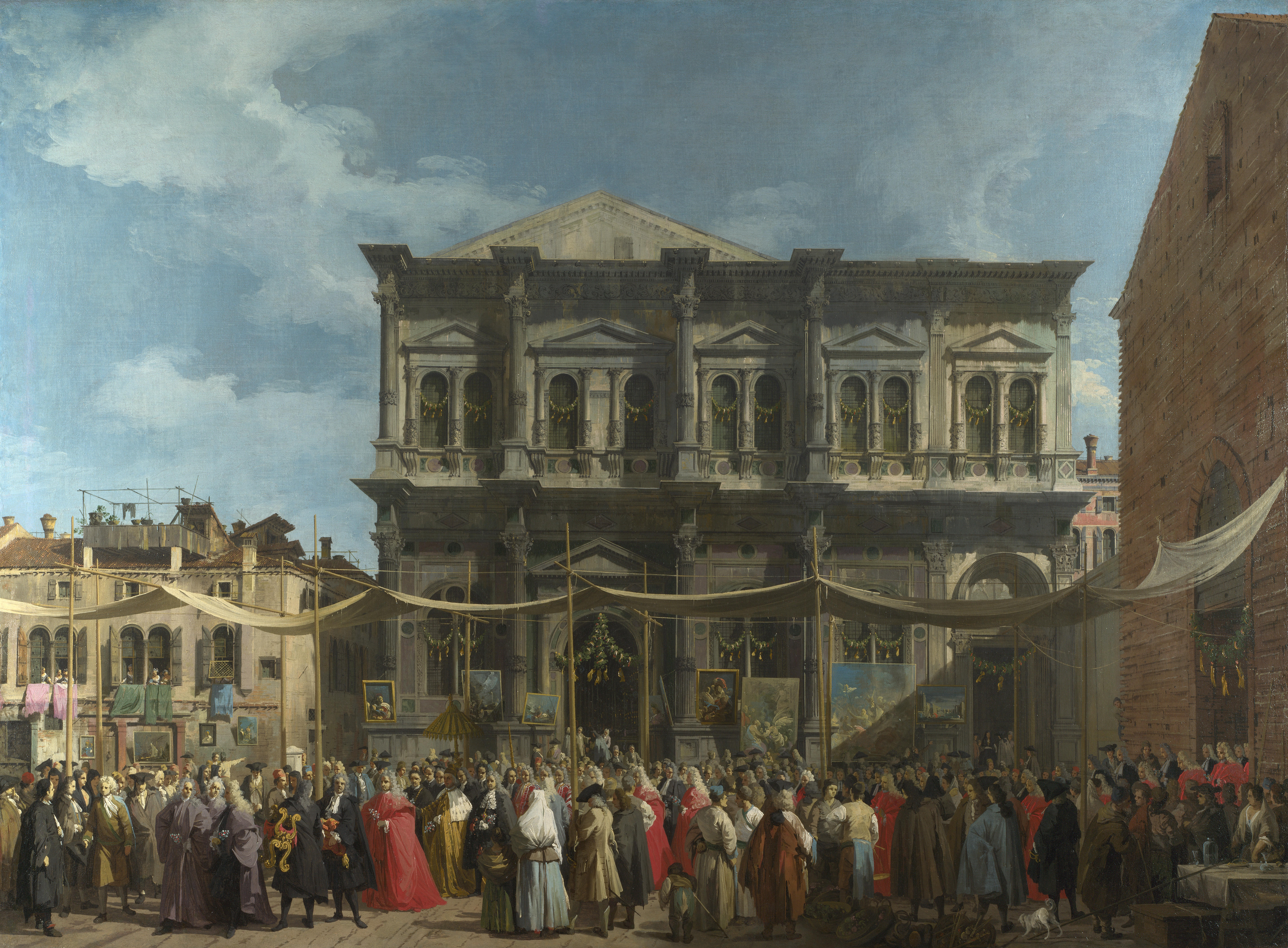
- Artist: Canaletto
- Year: 1735
- Type: Oil on canvas, landscape painting
- Dimensions: 147.7 cm × 199.4 cm (58.1 in × 78.5 in)
- Location: National Gallery, London

The Feast Day of Saint Roch is a 1735 cityscape painting by the Italian artist Canaletto. It shows a view of the church of San Rocco, Venice during the 16 August feast day of Saint Roch, as various dignateries led by the Doge leave following a Mass. Saint Roch was celebrated for his assistance in ending the Venetian plague of 1576. The Scuola Grande di San Rocco features prominently in the picture.

The painting is now in the National Gallery in London. It was acquired for the collection through an 1876 bequest by Wynne Ellis.

== See also ==
- List of paintings by Canaletto

== Bibliography ==
- Baetjer, Katharine. Canaletto. Metropolitan Museum of Art, 1989.
- Libby, Alexandra. Venice in the Age of Canaletto. Memphis Brooks Museum of Art, 2009.
- Uzanne, Octave. Canaletto. Parkstone, 2008.
