= The Grand Walk, Vauxhall Gardens =

Painting by Canaletto

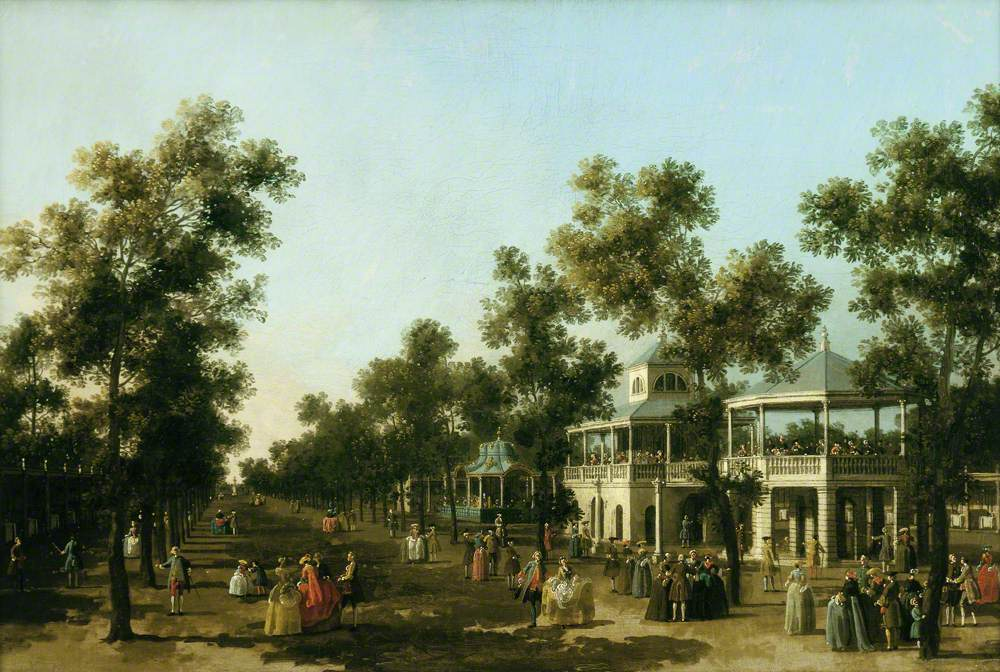
- Artist: Canaletto
- Year: c. 1751
- Type: Oil on canvas
- Dimensions: 51 cm × 76 cm (20 in × 30 in)
- Location: Compton Verney Art Gallery; Warwickshire

The Grand Walk, Vauxhall Gardens is a landscape painting by the Italian artist Canaletto. He had made his name painting scenes of his native Venice, but moved to England for nine years from 1746 and painted many noted views of mid-eighteenth-century Great Britain. Vauxhall Gardens was a fashionable pleasure gardens, located to the south of the Thames in London. A tree-lined walk ran some distance towards a statue of Aurora at the eastern perimeter of the gardens.

Canaletto uses an exaggerated perspective. It is now in the Compton Verney Art Gallery in Warwickshire.

== Bibliography ==
- Johnston, Mark. Street Trees in Britain: A History. Windgather Press, 2017.
- Kowalczyk, Bożena Anna . Canaletto, 1697–1768. Silvana Editoriale, 2018.
- Parry, Eric. Context: Architecture and the Genius of Place. John Wiley & Sons, 2015.
- Uzanne, Octave. Canaletto. Parkstone International, 2023.

== See also ==
- List of paintings by Canaletto
