= Bacino di San Marco from the Puntana della Dogana =

Painting by Canaletto (Pinacoteca di Brera)

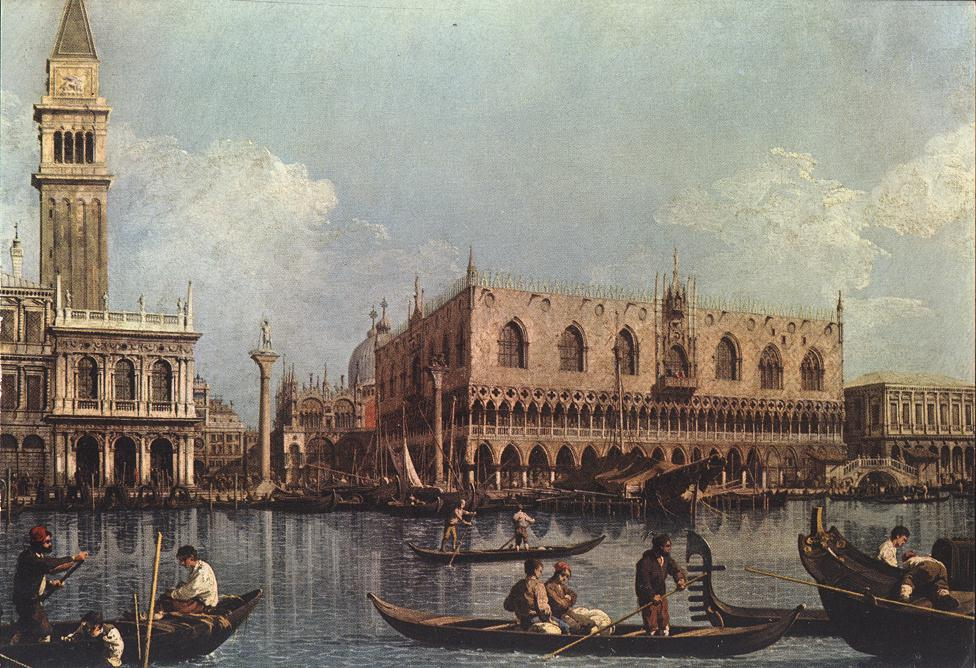
Bacino di San Marco from the Puntana della Dogana (ca. 1740–1745) by Canaletto

Bacino di San Marco from the Puntana della Dogana is an oil on canvas painting executed ca. 1740–1745 by Canaletto, now in the Pinacoteca di Brera in Milan. It forms a pair with The Grand Canal looking towards Punta della Dogana from Campo Sant'Ivo (also in Pinacoteca di Brera), with both works produced in the artist's mature period just before his move to London.

It shows the Bacino di San Marco (San Marco basin) from punta della Dogana. It is more light-filled than his previous works, with clearer brushwork and showing the scene in the midday sun with more figures than in his earlier work.

== See also ==
- List of works by Canaletto
