= A View of Dolo on the Brenta Canal =

Painting by Canaletto

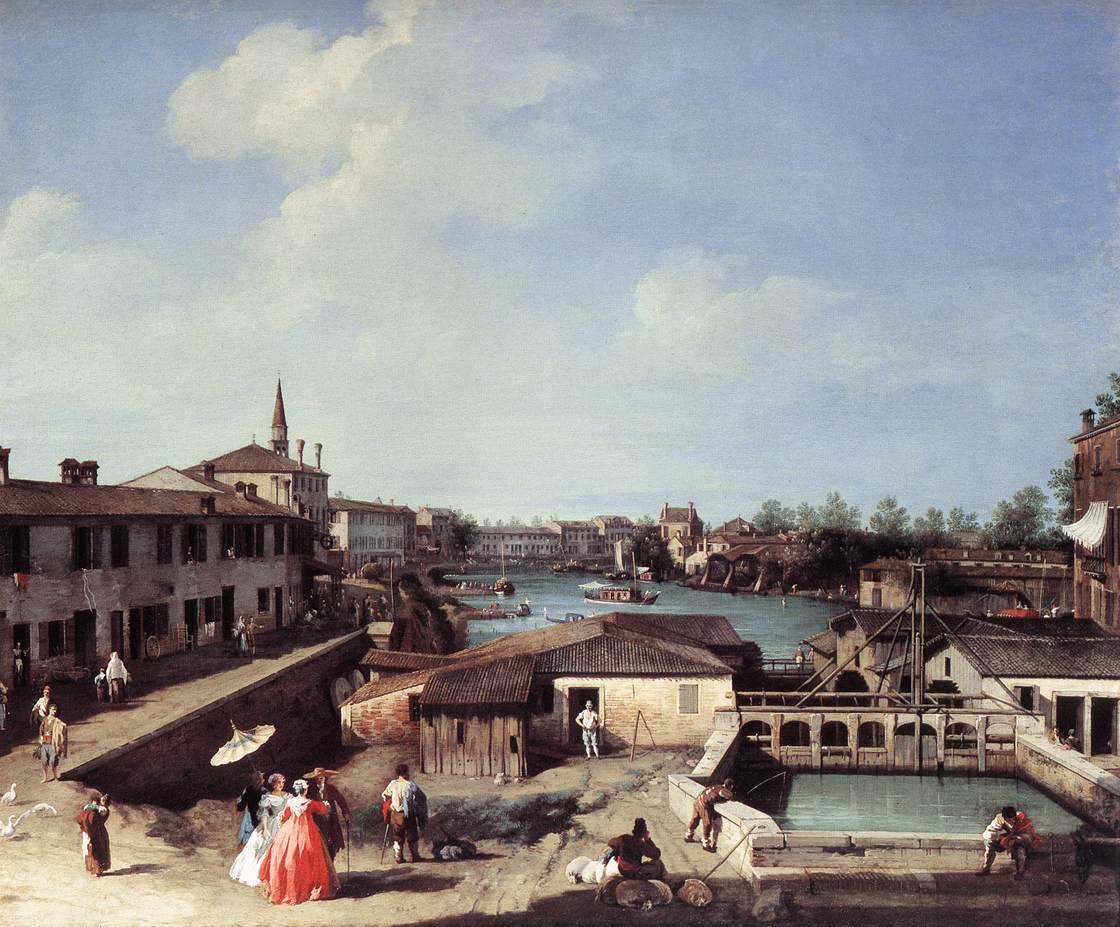
- Version in the Staatsgalerie
- Artist: Canaletto
- Year: 1725–1729
- Type: Oil on canvas, landscape painting
- Dimensions: 63 cm × 96 cm (25 in × 38 in)
- Location: Ashmolean Museum; Oxford

A View of Dolo on the Brenta Canal is a c.1729 landscape painting by the Italian artist Canaletto. It presents a depiction of Dolo, a town in Veneto which is now in the Metropolitan City of Venice, on the banks of the Brenta Canal. It was considered the gateway to Venice from the north and was lined with fashionable villas. It was produced early in the artist's career. Today the painting is in the collection of the Ashmolean Museum in Oxford, which acquired it in 1855 when it was donated by Chambers Hall. Another version is in the Staatsgalerie in Stuttgart, although the Oxford painting is likely the protoype. An engraving was produced based on the painting. Francesco Guardi also produced a similar view of Dolo, the composition likely influenced by Canaletto. Much later in 1763, after his return from Britain, Canaletto produced another view of the canal in his The Lock at Dolo.

== See also ==
- List of paintings by Canaletto

== Bibliography ==
- Briganti, Giuliano. The View Painters of Europe. Phaidon, 1970.
- DeGrazia, Diane, Garberson, Eric & Bowron, Edgar Peters. Italian Paintings of the Seventeenth and Eighteenth Centuries. National Gallery of Art, 1996.
