= Corpse of Christ =

Painting by Annibale Carracci

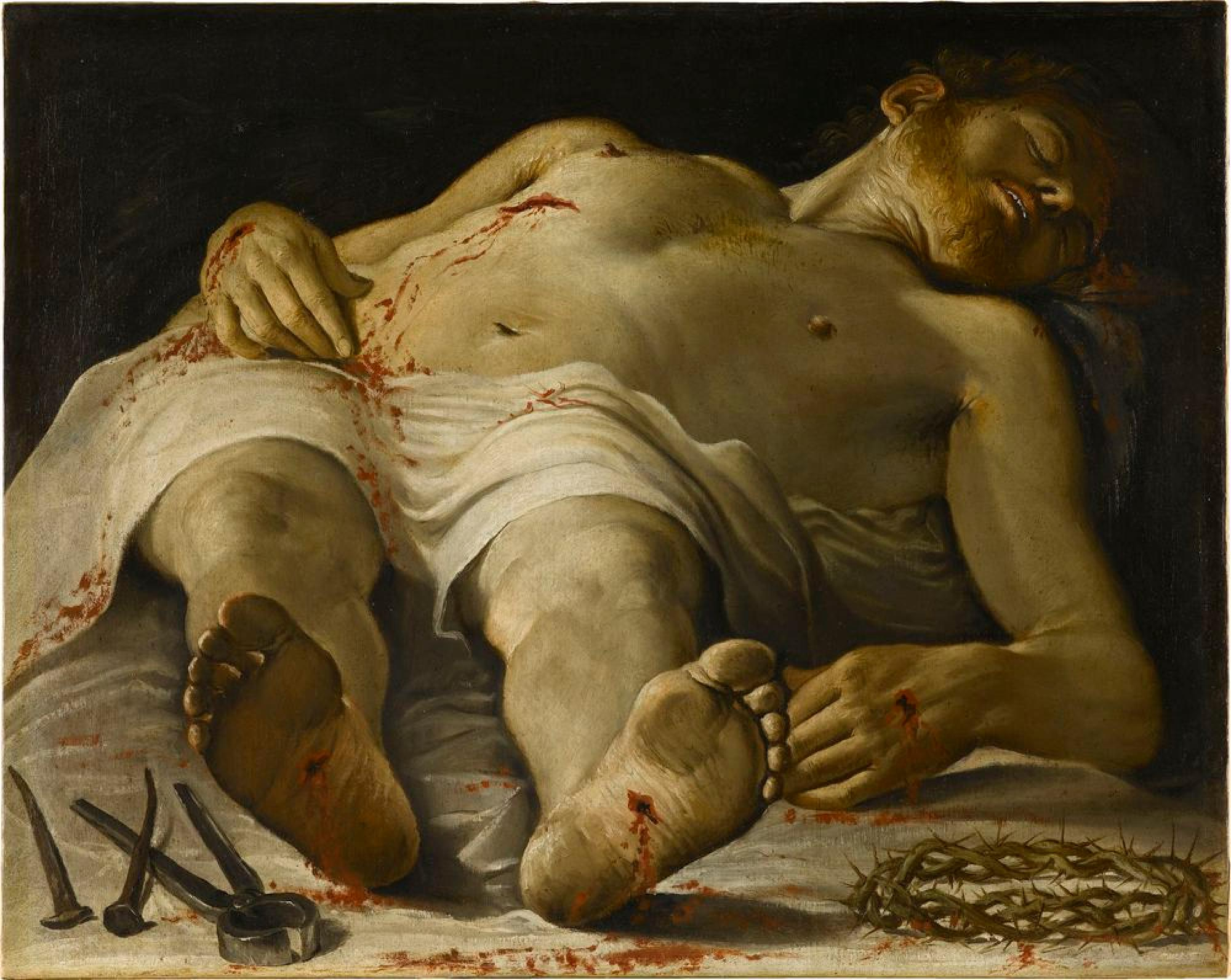
- Artist: Annibale Carracci
- Year: 1583–1585
- Medium: Oil on canvas
- Dimensions: 70.7 cm × 88.8 cm (27.8 in × 35.0 in)
- Location: Staatsgalerie Stuttgart; Stuttgart

The Corpse of Christ is a painting by the Italian Baroque master Annibale Carracci, dating to c. 1583–1585. It is currently housed in the Staatsgalerie of Stuttgart, Germany.

The work, dating to Carracci's early career, is a manifest homage to Andrea Mantegna's Dead Christ, which he had perhaps seen in the Aldobrandini collection. Christ is portrayed lying in a contorted position, seen from his feet. At his feet lie the Crown of Thorns, the nails that were embedded in his hands and feet, and the pincers used to remove the nails. These objects are called the Arma Christi, or the Instruments of the Passion. Differently from Mantegna, Carracci did not paint the mourners at the side, and adopted a more realistic depiction of the body.

== General References ==
- Posner, Donald (1971). Annibale Carracci; A Study in the reform of Italian Painting around 1590. London: Phaidon. p. 3. ISBN 0714814717.
- Gianfranco, Malafarina (1976). L'opera completa di Annibale Carracci. Milan: Rizzoli
