= The French Ambassador's Arrival in Venice =

Painting by Canaletto

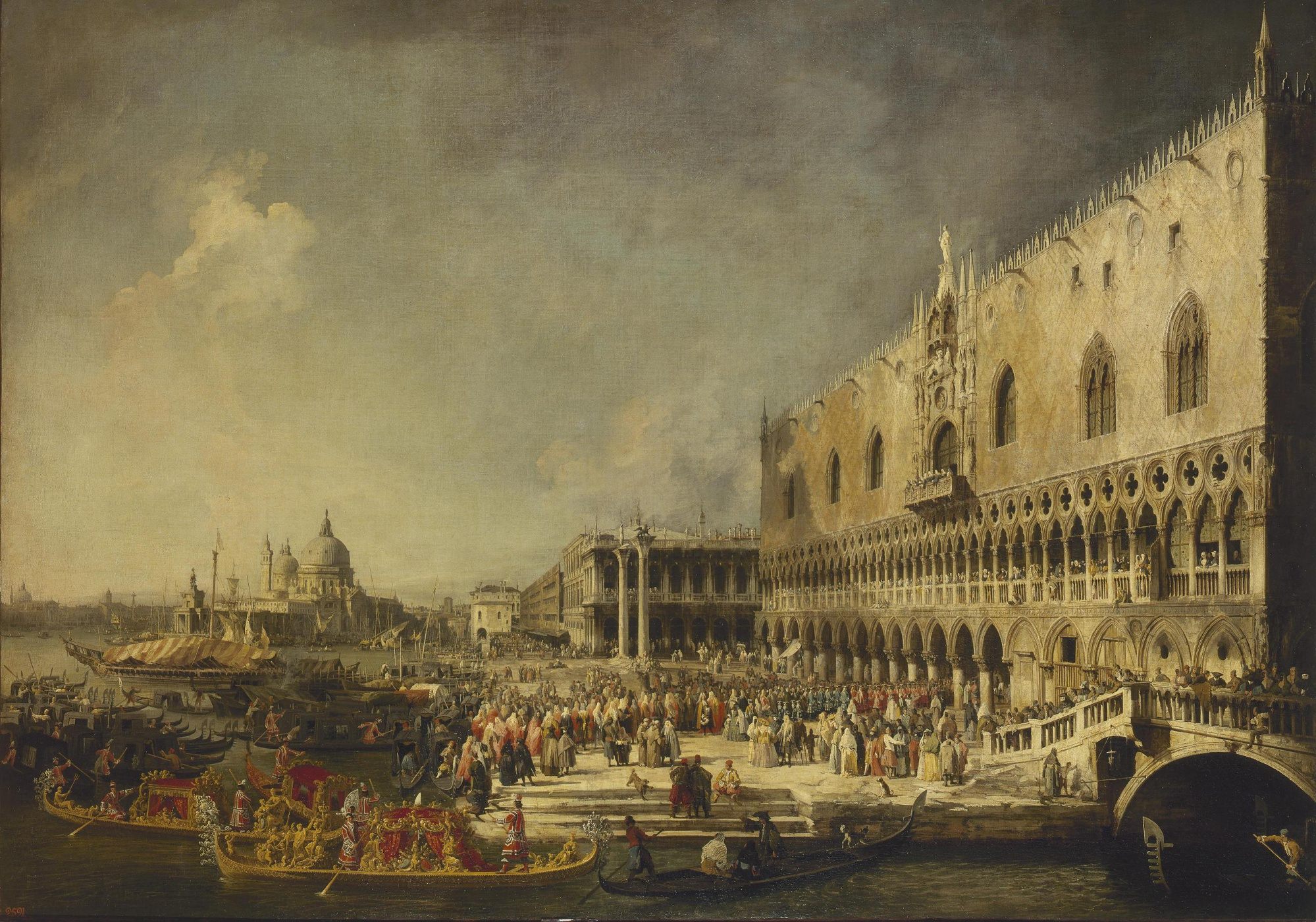
The French Ambassador's Arrival in Venice (ca. 1726–27) by Canaletto

The French Ambassador's Arrival in Venice or Reception of the French Ambassador in Venice is an oil on canvas painting executed ca. 1726–27 by Canaletto. It depicts Count Jacques-Vincent Languet de Gergy disembarking onto the quay in front the Doge's Palace and being greeted by officials of the Venetian Republic. The painting was acquired by Catherine the Great between 1763 and 1796 and is now in the Hermitage Museum in St Petersburg.

== See also ==
- List of works by Canaletto
