= Staatsgalerie Stuttgart =

Art museum in Stuttgart, Germany

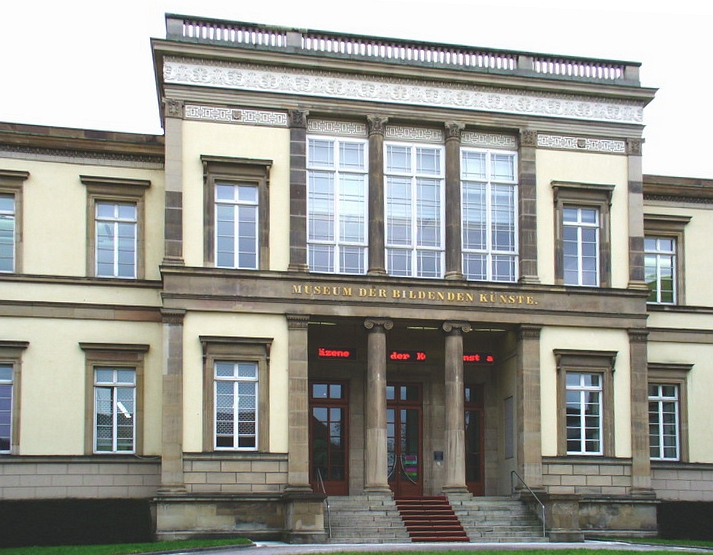
- Alte Staatsgalerie
- Interactive fullscreen map
- Location: Stuttgart, Germany
- Coordinates: 48°46′49″N 9°11′13″E

The Staatsgalerie Stuttgart ([ˈʃtaːts.ɡaləˌʁiː ˈʃtʊtɡaʁt], "State Gallery") is an art museum in Stuttgart, Germany, it opened in 1843. In 1984, the opening of the Neue Staatsgalerie (New State Gallery) designed by James Stirling transformed the once provincial gallery into one of Europe's leading museums.

== Alte Staatsgalerie ==
Originally, the classicist building of the Alte Staatsgalerie was also the home of the Royal Art School. The building was built in 1843. After being severely damaged in World War II, it was rebuilt in 1945–1947 and reopened in 1958.

It houses the following collections:

- Old German paintings 1300–1550
- Italian paintings 1300–1800
- Dutch paintings 1500–1700
- German paintings of the baroque period
- Art from 1800–1900 (romanticism, impressionism)

== Neue Staatsgalerie ==
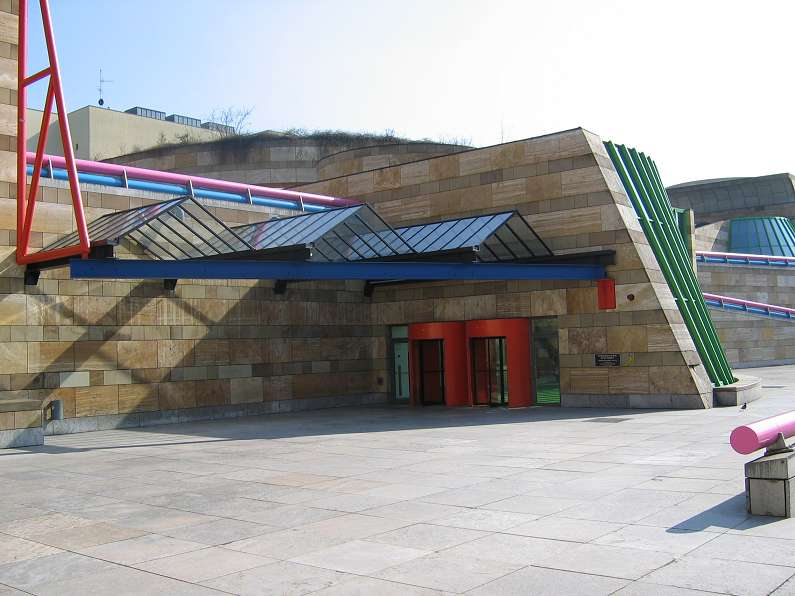
Neue Staatsgalerie

The Neue Staatsgalerie, a controversial architectural design by James Stirling, opened on March 9, 1984 on a site right next to the old building. It houses a collection of 20th-century modern art — from Pablo Picasso to Oskar Schlemmer, Joan Miró and Joseph Beuys. The building layout bears resemblance to Schinkel's Altes Museum, with a series of connected galleries around three sides of a central rotunda. However, the front of the museum is not as symmetrical as the Altes Museum and the traditional configuration is slanted with the entrance set at an angle.

== Notable works in collection ==
- A pair of marriage portraits by Frans Hals (about 1635)
- Canaletto's A View of Dolo on the Brenta Canal (1730-1735)
- Annibale Carracci's Corpse of Christ (1583–1585)
- Max Beckmann's Journey on the Fish
- Salvador Dalí's The Raised Instant (1938)
- Otto Dix's The Match Seller (1920)
- George Grosz's The Funeral (1918)
- Franz Marc's The Small Yellow Horses (1912)
- Henri Matisse's With the Toilet (La Hair-style) (1907)
- Joan Miró's The Bird with the Calm View, the Wings in Flames (1952)
- Piet Mondrian's Composition in White, Red and Blue (1936)
- Pablo Picasso's Tumblers (Mother and Son) (1905), Laufende Frauen am Strand (1922), The Breakfast in the Free One (1961)
- Barnett Newman's Who's Afraid of Red, Yellow and Blue II (1967)
- Works by: Paul Klee, Marc Chagall, Wassily Kandinsky, Ferdinand Hodler, Willi Baumeister, Gerhard Richter

In 2013, the Staatsgalerie returned Virgin and Child, a 15th-century painting attributed to the Master of Flémalle (1375–1444), to the estate of Max Stern, a German-born Jewish dealer who fled the Nazis and later operated the Dominion Gallery in Montreal.

== See also ==
- Max Silberberg
