= Interior of the Rotunda at Ranelagh =

Painting by Canaletto

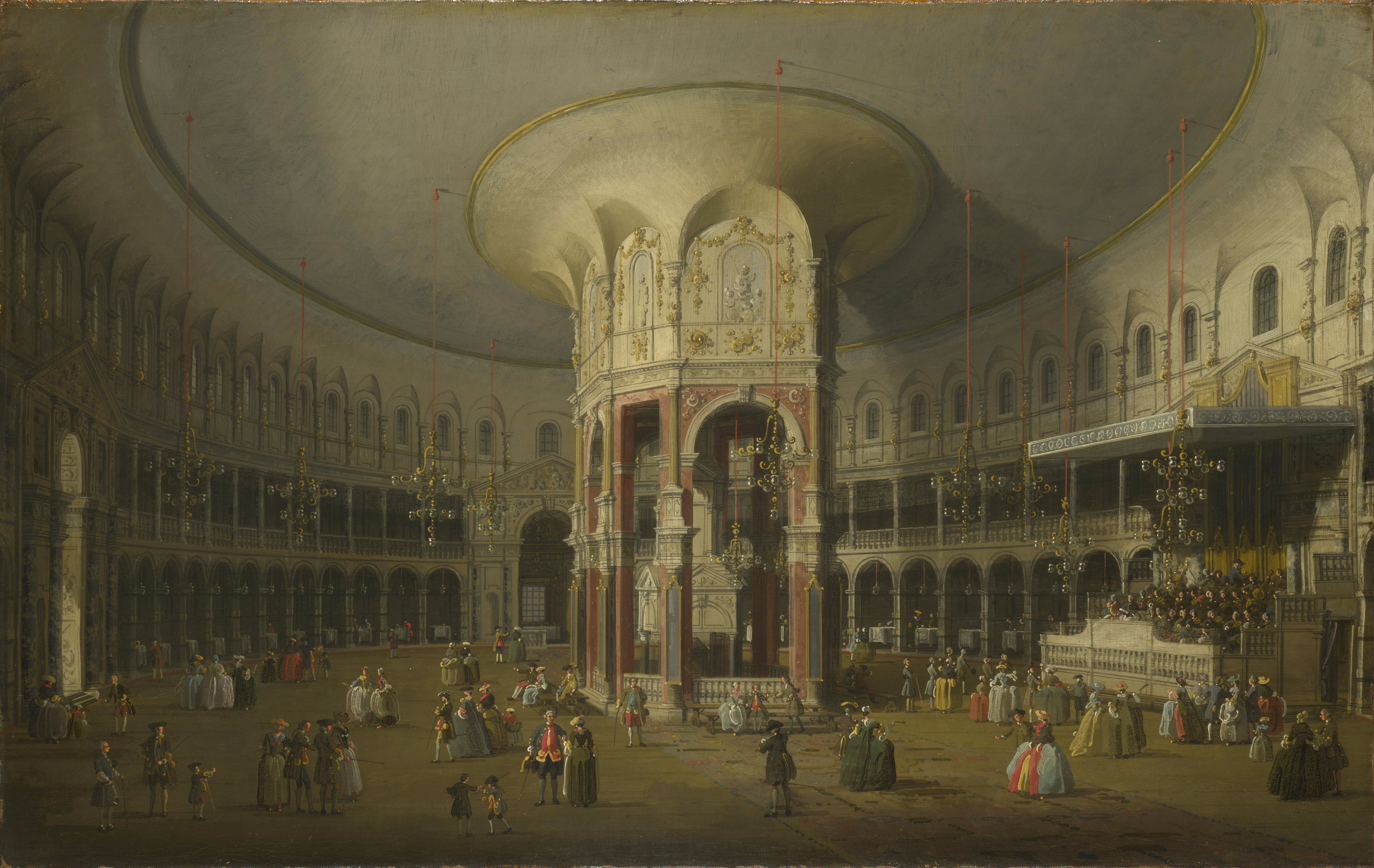
- Artist: Canaletto
- Year: 1754
- Type: Oil on canvas, landscape painting
- Dimensions: 47 cm × 75.6 cm (19 in × 29.8 in)
- Location: National Gallery, London

Interior of the Rotunda at Ranelagh is a 1754 oil painting by the Italian artist Canaletto. It depicts the interior of the large rotunda of Ranelagh Gardens in Chelsea, a major venue for concerts and ever events that rivalled Vauxhall Gardens.

The painting was commissioned by Thomas Hollis. It was produced towards the end of Canaletto's nine-year stay in Britain before returning to his native Venice. It was exhibited at the British Institution in 1841 and again in 1864. It is now in the National Gallery having been acquired in 1894. Another version, viewed from the opposite side of the rotunda, is in the collection of the Compton Verney Art Gallery in Warwickshire.

== See also ==
- List of paintings by Canaletto

== Bibliography ==
- Baetjer, Katharine. Canaletto. Metropolitan Museum of Art, 1989.
- Snodin, Michael & Styles, John. Design and the Decorative Arts: Britain 1500-1900. Harry N. Abrams, 2001.
