= Eton College (painting) =

Painting by Canaletto

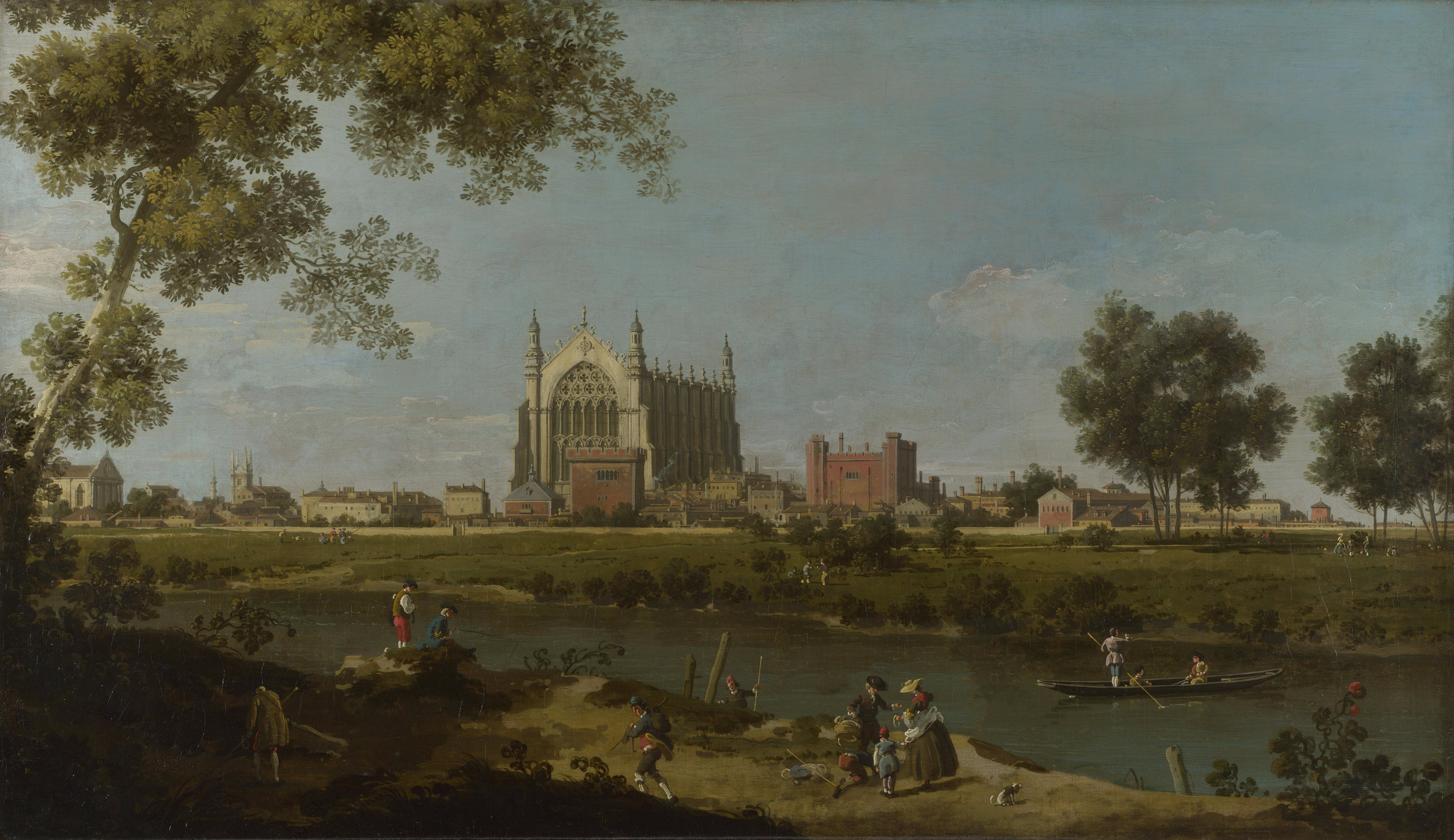
- Artist: Canaletto
- Year: 1754
- Type: Oil on canvas, landscape painting
- Dimensions: 62 cm × 108 cm (24 in × 43 in)
- Location: National Gallery, London

Eton College is a 1754 landscape painting by the Italian artist Canaletto. It depicts a view of Eton College, then in Buckinghamshire, from the opposite bank of the River Thames at Windsor. Prominent amongst the buildings is Eton College Chapel, built during the fifteenth century.

It was one of the final paintings produced by Canaletto at the end of his nine-year stay in Britain before he returned to his native Italy. Today it is in the collection of the National Gallery in London, having been acquired in 1876.

== See also ==
- List of paintings by Canaletto

== Bibliography ==
- Baetjer, Katharine. Canaletto. Metropolitan Museum of Art, 1989.
- Hermann, Luke. British Landscape Painting of the Eighteenth Century. Oxford University Press, 1974.
- Thomson, David. Renaissance Architecture: Critics, Patrons, Luxury. Manchester University Press, 1993.
