= St. Paul's Cathedral (painting) =

Painting by Canaletto

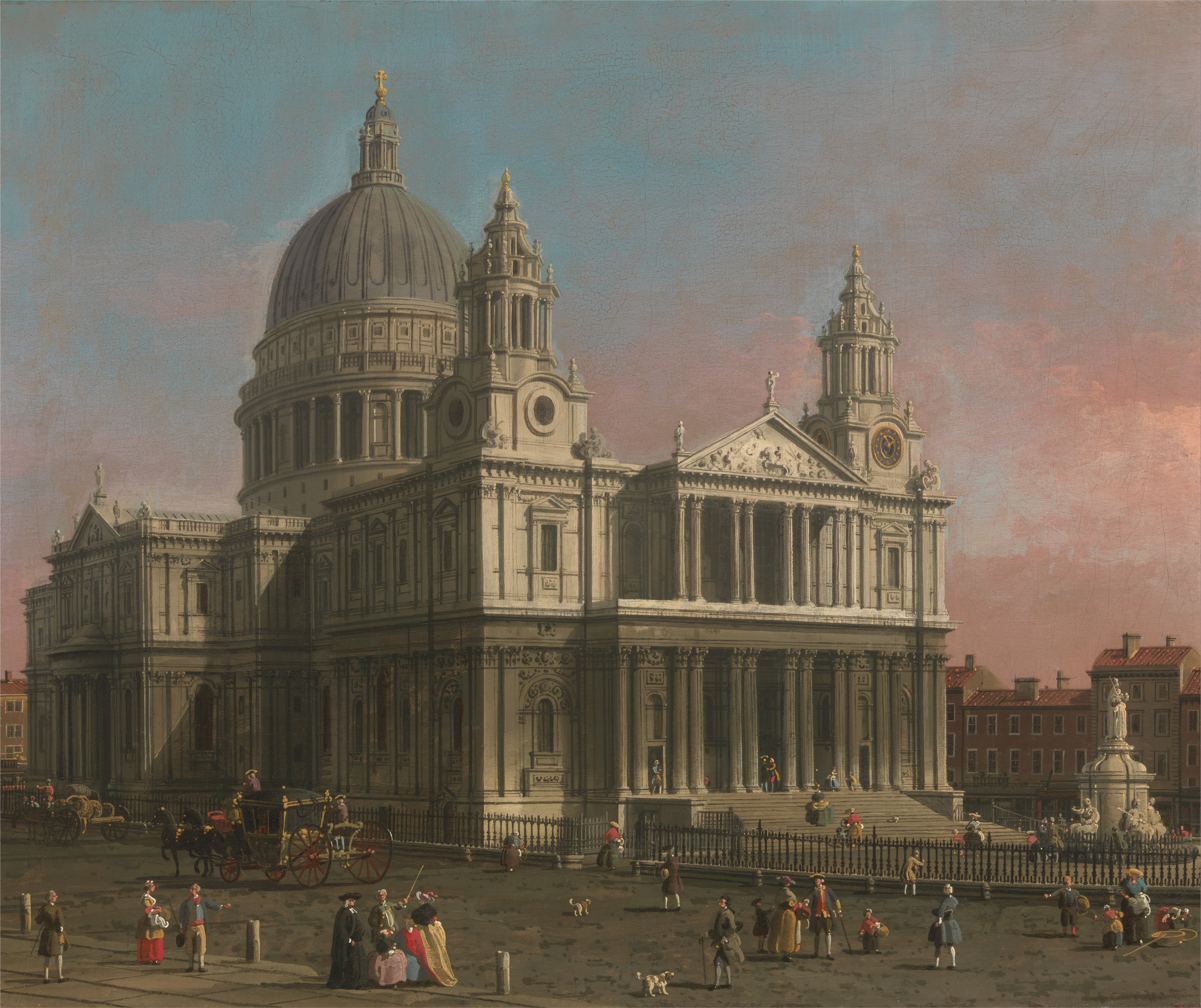
- Artist: Canaletto
- Year: 1754
- Type: Oil on canvas, landscape painting
- Dimensions: 52.1 cm × 61.6 cm (20.5 in × 24.3 in)
- Location: Yale Center for British Art; New Haven

St. Paul's Cathedral is a 1754 oil painting by the Italian artist Canaletto. Painted towards the end of his stay in England, the Venetian artist produced a veduta featuring St. Paul's Cathedral in the City of London. While St Paul's had featured in the distance of many of his paintings of the River Thames, this was the only close-up view of the cathedral he produced. It is shown from the north-west with the marble Statue of Queen Anne visible on the right. The rays of the setting sun illuminate the scene.

The painting once belonged to John Hay who served as American Ambassador to Britain and Secretary of State. Today it is in the possession of the Yale Center for British Art in Connecticut as part of the Paul Mellon Collection.

== See also ==
- List of paintings by Canaletto

== Bibliography ==
- Burns, Arthur. St. Paul's: The Cathedral Church of London, 604-2004. Yale University Press, 2004.
- Tarabra, Daniela. European Art of the Eighteenth Century. Getty Publications, 2008
