= Marie-Elisabeth Simons =

Belgian artist (1754–1774)

Marie-Elisabeth Simons (1754–1774) was a painter and miniaturist from the Austrian Netherlands. She foremost painted miniature portraits, fruits, flowers and insects.

She was the daughter of painter Jean-Baptiste Simons.
