= Françoise-Jeanne Ridderbosch =

Belgian painter

- Born: Françoise-Jeanne Ridderbosch; 2 October 1754; Austrian Netherlands
- Died: 27 February 1837 (aged 82)
- Occupation(s): Painter and engraver

Françoise-Jeanne Ridderbosch (2 October 1754 – 27 February 1837) was a Belgian painter and engraver.

She became known for her engravings and eventually also oil paintings, often with allegorical motifs. She was popular among the nobility of the Austrian Netherlands, where she was favored by Prince Charles Alexander of Lorraine, the duke of Ursel and the Louis Engelbert, 6th Duke of Arenberg. Between 1792 and 1832, she often participated in public exhibitions and was a leading member of the artistic elite. In 1803, she painted Napoleon Bonaparte and was given a pension by him. During her final years, she was favored by Louise of Orléans, queen of the Belgians.
