= Emanuel Granberg =

Finnish painter (1754–1797)

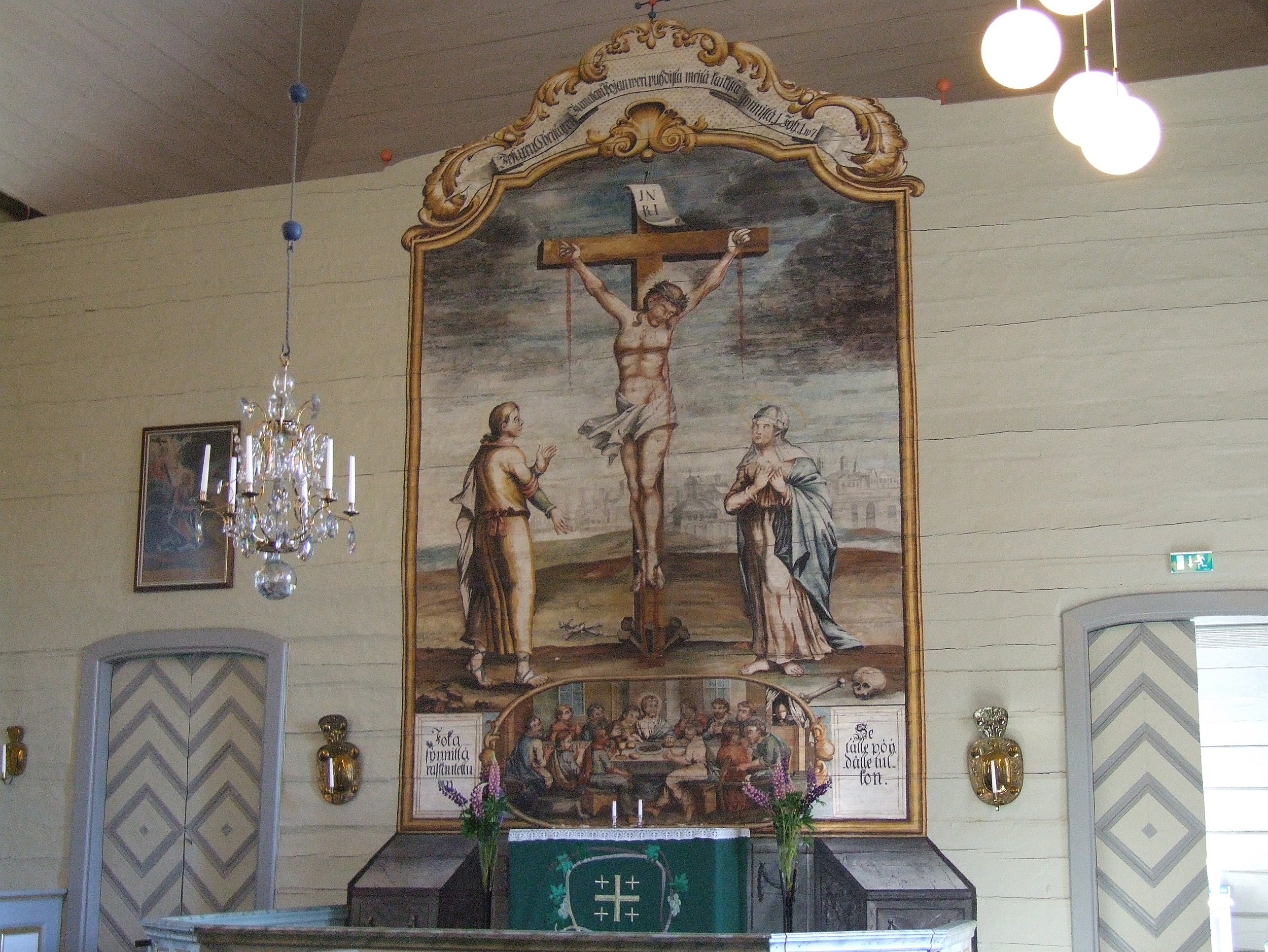
Altarpiece of Jesus on the cross with John on the left and Mary on the right, by Emanuel Granberg, Distemper (glue-tempera) on wood, Vihanti Church, 1787

Emanuel Granberg (1754–1797) was a Finnish painter.

Granberg was born in Vihanti. His father was a chaplain. Granberg primarily worked on murals and paintings for local churches. His first work was for the Muhos church 1773–1774. He also produced works for churches in Oulunsalo, Raahe, Sotkamo. Some of his surviving works can be found in the Oulu Museum of Art and the National Museum of Finland.
