= Victor-Jean Nicolle =

French painter (1754–1826)

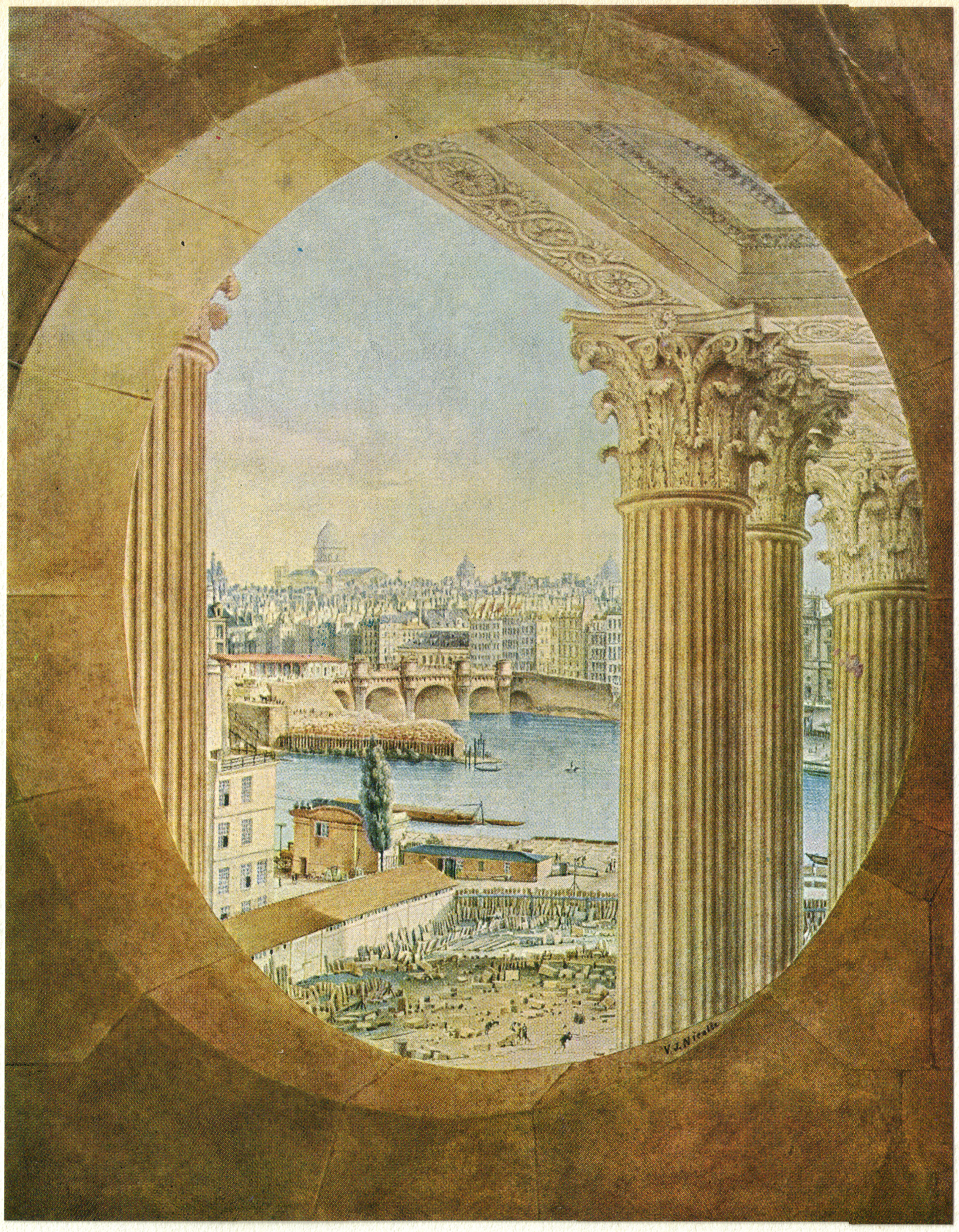
Victor-Jean Nicolle, View of the Seine from the Louvre, 50,8 x 39.4 cm. Musée Carnavalet, Paris

Victor-Jean Nicolle (1754–1826) was a French artist.

Nicolle was born in the city of Paris. He revealed his talent for landscape compositions at an early age when, in 1771, as a pupil of the Royal School of Drawing he won the Perspective Prize. He acquired a passion for depicting the architecture of classical ruins and in pursuit of this passion he embarked on a journey throughout southern Europe- Italy (Venice, Bologna, Florence, Naples and Rome) as well as France.

Fascinated by Rome, he made two trips there, 1787–1789 and 1806–1811, to draw the buildings.

Victor-Jean Nicolle's compositions include such works as the Pont Neuf seen through a circular window in the Louvre (shortly after 1808) which illustrates the view taken from one of the circular windows behind the colonnade of the east front of the Louvre, in Paris, hence the title of his work.

His work forms a significant historic and topographical record of urban settings.
