= Canaletto =

Italian painter of landscapes (1697–1768)

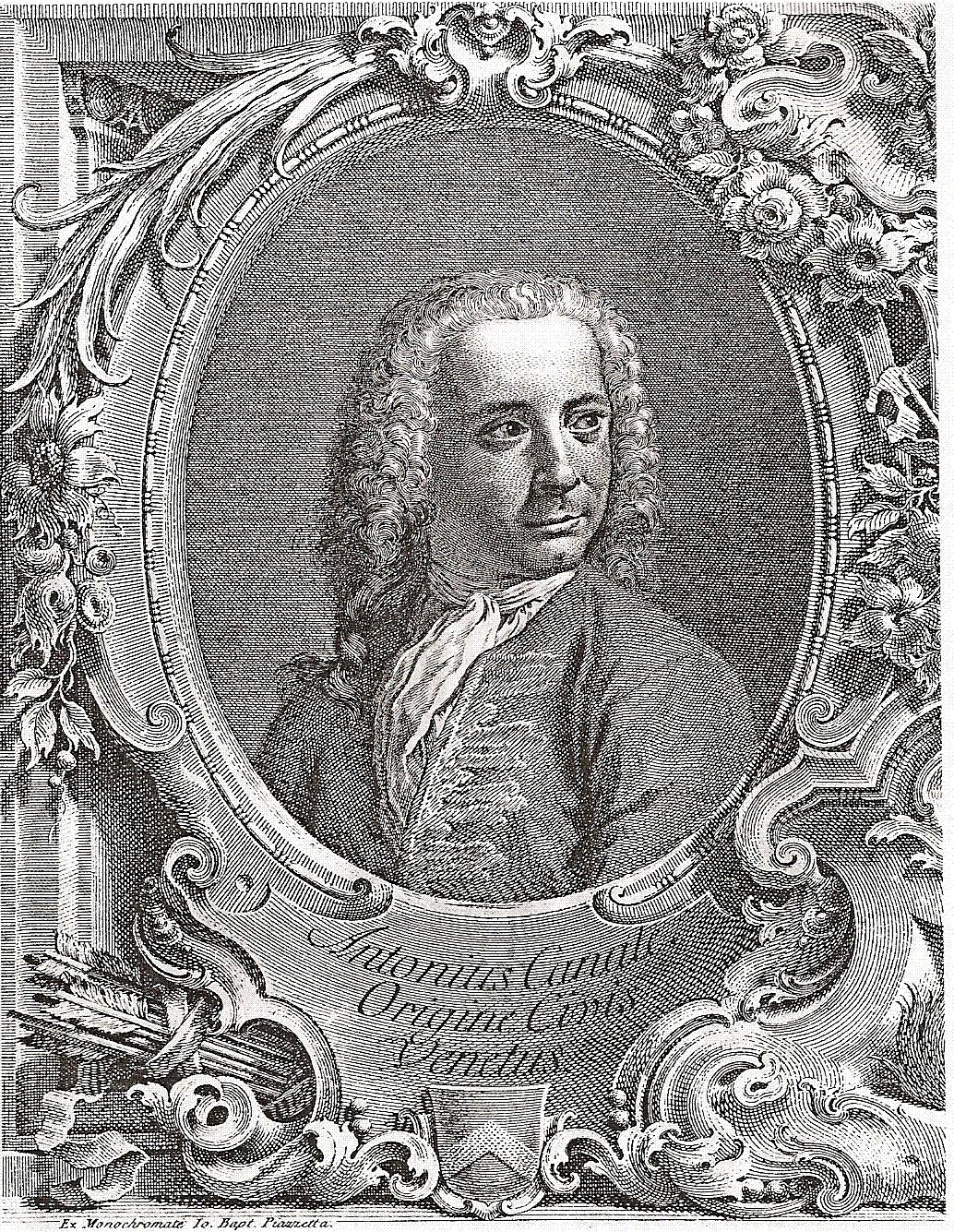
- Born: Giovanni Antonio Canal; 18 October 1697; Venice, Republic of Venice
- Died: 19 April 1768 (aged 70); Venice, Republic of Venice
- Education: Luca Carlevaris
- Known for: Landscape art, etching
- Notable work: The Stonemason's Yard
- Parent(s): Bernardo Canal; Artemisia Barbieri
- Patrons: Owen Swiny; Joseph Smith

Giovanni Antonio Canal (18 October 1697 – 19 April 1768), commonly known as Canaletto (Italian: [kanaˈletto]), was an Italian painter from the Republic of Venice, considered an important member of the 18th-century Venetian school.

Painter of cityscapes or vedute, of Venice, Rome, and London, he also painted imaginary views (referred to as capricci), although the demarcation in his works between the real and the imaginary is never quite clearcut. He was further an important printmaker using the etching technique. In the period from 1746 to 1756, he worked in England, where he painted many views of London and other sites, including Warwick Castle and Alnwick Castle. He was highly successful in England, thanks to the British merchant and connoisseur Joseph "Consul" Smith, whose large collection of Canaletto's works was sold to King George III in 1762.

== Early career ==
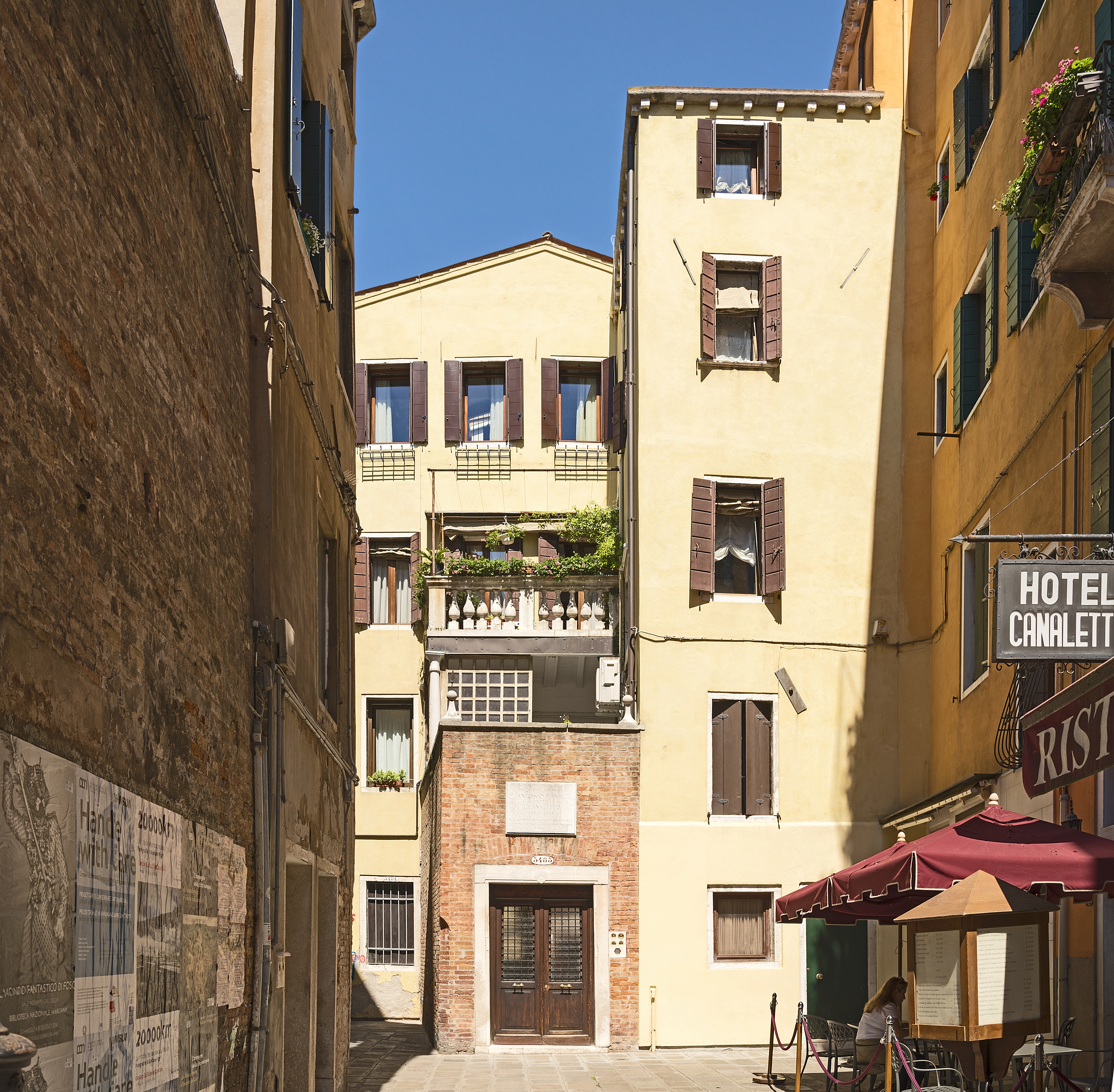
Canaletto's birthplace, Calle de la Malvasia, Castello, Venice

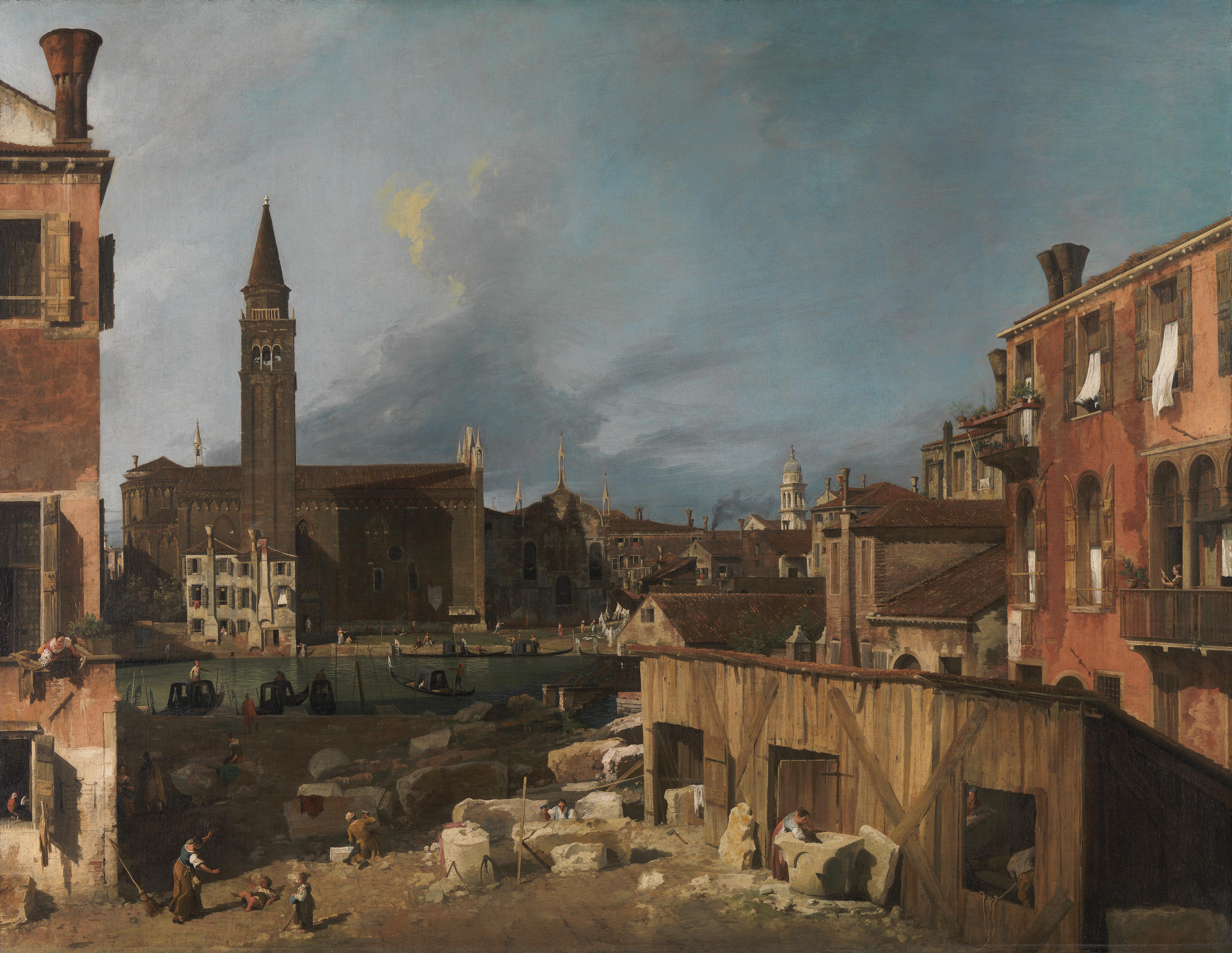
The Stonemason's Yard, painted c. 1725

He was born in Venice as the son of the painter Bernardo Canal, hence his mononym Canaletto ("little Canal"), and Artemisia Barbieri. Canaletto served an apprenticeship with his father and his brother of a theatrical scene painter. In 1718, having already taken part in designing sets for operas by Fortunato Chelleri, Giovanni Porto and Antonio Vivaldi, Canaletto travelled to Rome. During his time in Rome, he worked with his father producing the scenery for two operas by the composer Alessandro Scarlatti, Tito Sempronio Greco and Turno Aricino which were performed at the Teatro Catranica during the carnival season of 1720.

Canaletto was inspired by the Roman vedutista Giovanni Paolo Pannini, and started painting the daily life of the city and its people.

After returning from Rome in 1719, he began painting in his topographical style. His first known signed and dated work is Architectural Capriccio (1723, Milan, in a private collection). Studying with the older Luca Carlevarijs, a well-regarded painter of urban cityscapes, he rapidly became his master's equal.

In 1725, the painter Alessandro Marchesini, who was also the buyer for the Lucchese art collector Stefano Conti, had inquired about buying two more 'views of Venice', when the agent urged him to consider instead the work of "Antonio Canale... it is like Carlevaris, but you can see the sun shining in it."

=== Outdoor painting ===
Much of Canaletto's early artwork was painted "from nature", differing from the then customary practice of completing paintings in the studio. Some of his later works do revert to this custom, as suggested by the tendency for distant figures to be painted as blobs of colour – an effect possibly produced by using a camera obscura, which blurs farther-away objects. Also, his paintings are always notable for their accuracy, an example being his recording of the seasonal submerging of Venice in water and ice. In particular, his precise use of correct perspective has led experts in the past to believe that much of the detail in his paintings had been achieved by tracing the image off a camera obscura. It is known that Canaletto owned a camera obscura, but several experts today are of the opinion that he may have taken some inspiration from it, rather than actually using it for accurate photorealistic tracing in preparation for his paintings.

=== Early and late work ===
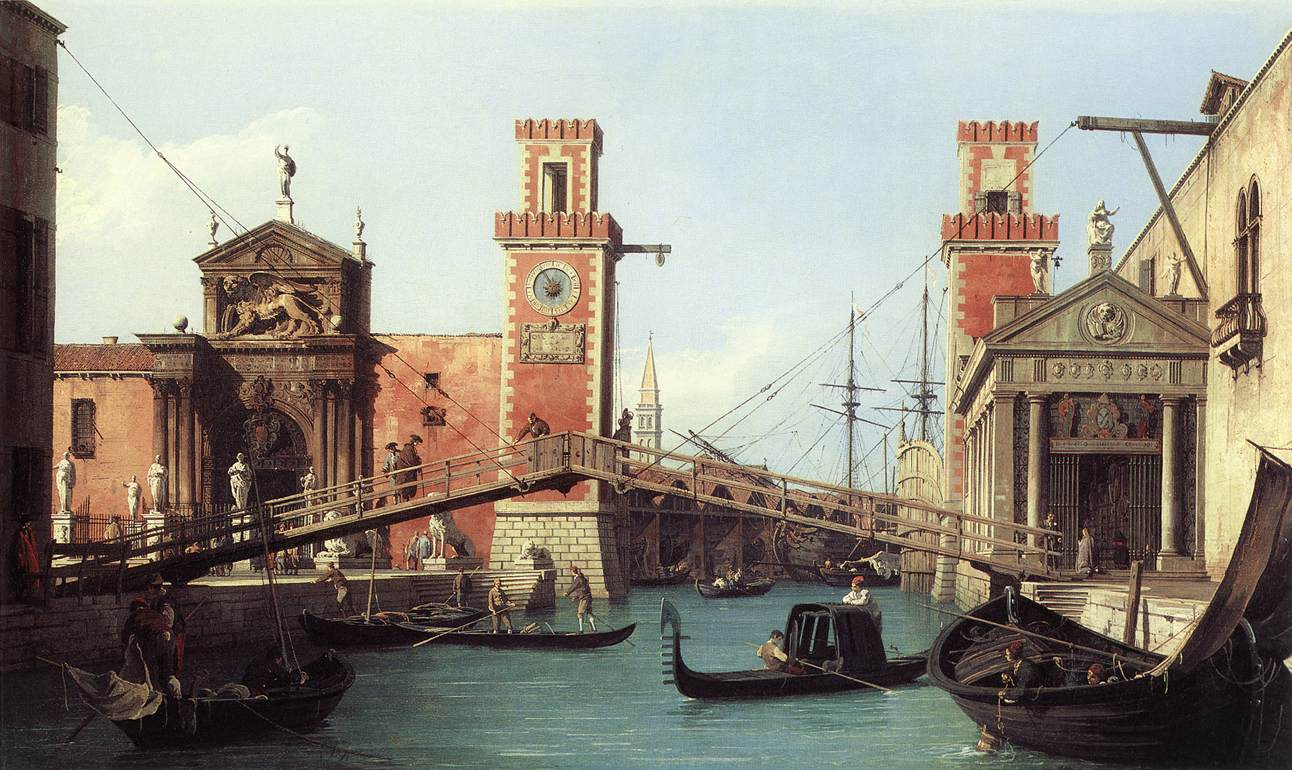
View of the Entrance to the Venetian Arsenal, 1732

Canaletto's early works remain his most coveted and, according to many authorities, his best. One of his early pieces is The Stonemason's Yard (c. 1725, the National Gallery, London) which depicts a humble working area of the city. It is regarded one of his finest works, and was presented by Sir George Beaumont in 1823 and 1828.

Later, Canaletto painted grand scenes of the canals of Venice and the Doge's Palace. His large-scale landscapes portrayed the city's pageantry and waning traditions, making innovative use of atmospheric effects and strong local colours. For these qualities, his works may be said to have anticipated Impressionism.

His graphic print S. A. Giustina in Prà della Vale was found in the 2012 Munich Art Hoard.

== Work in England ==
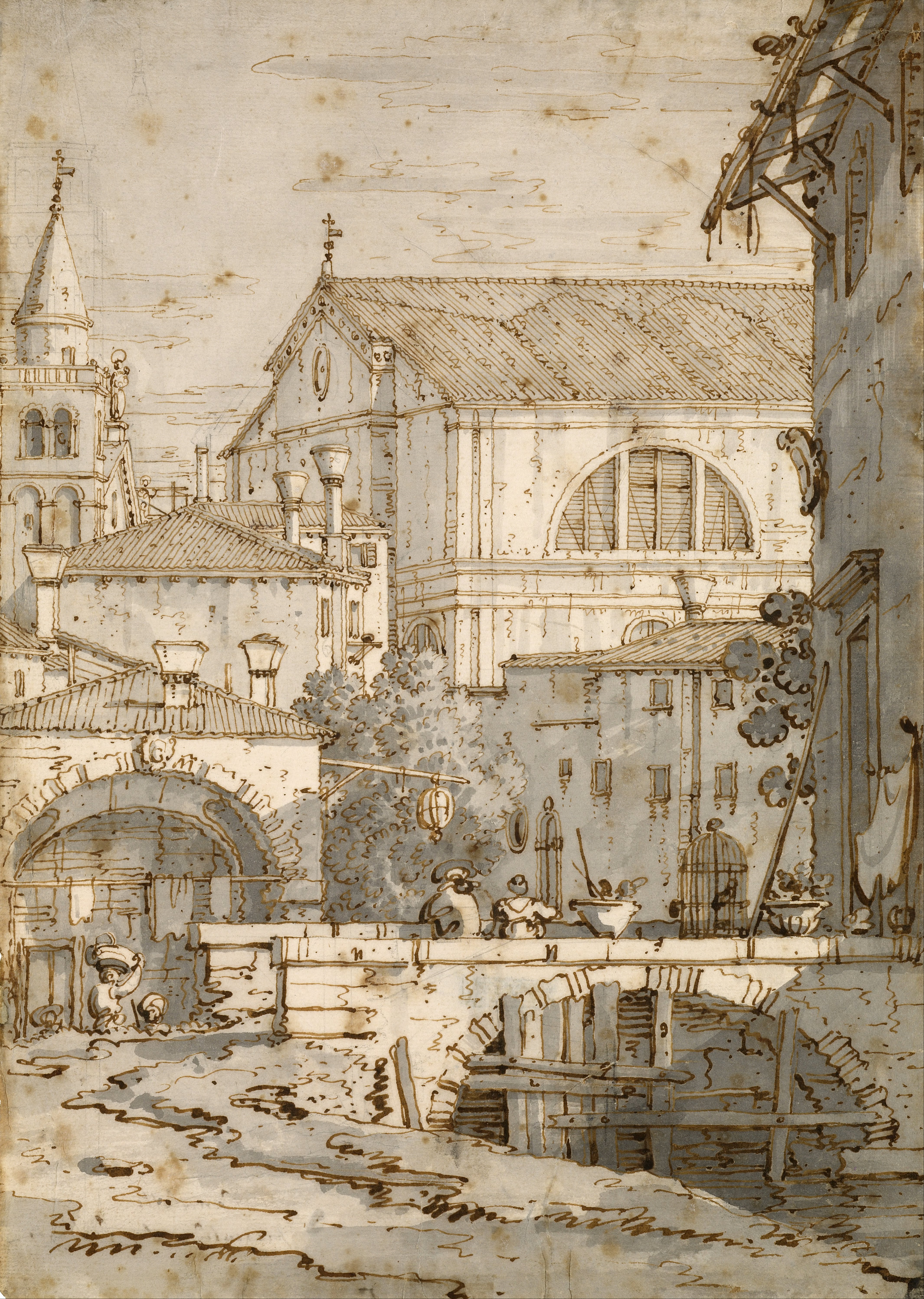
Architectural Capriccio, drawing, Morgan Library & Museum

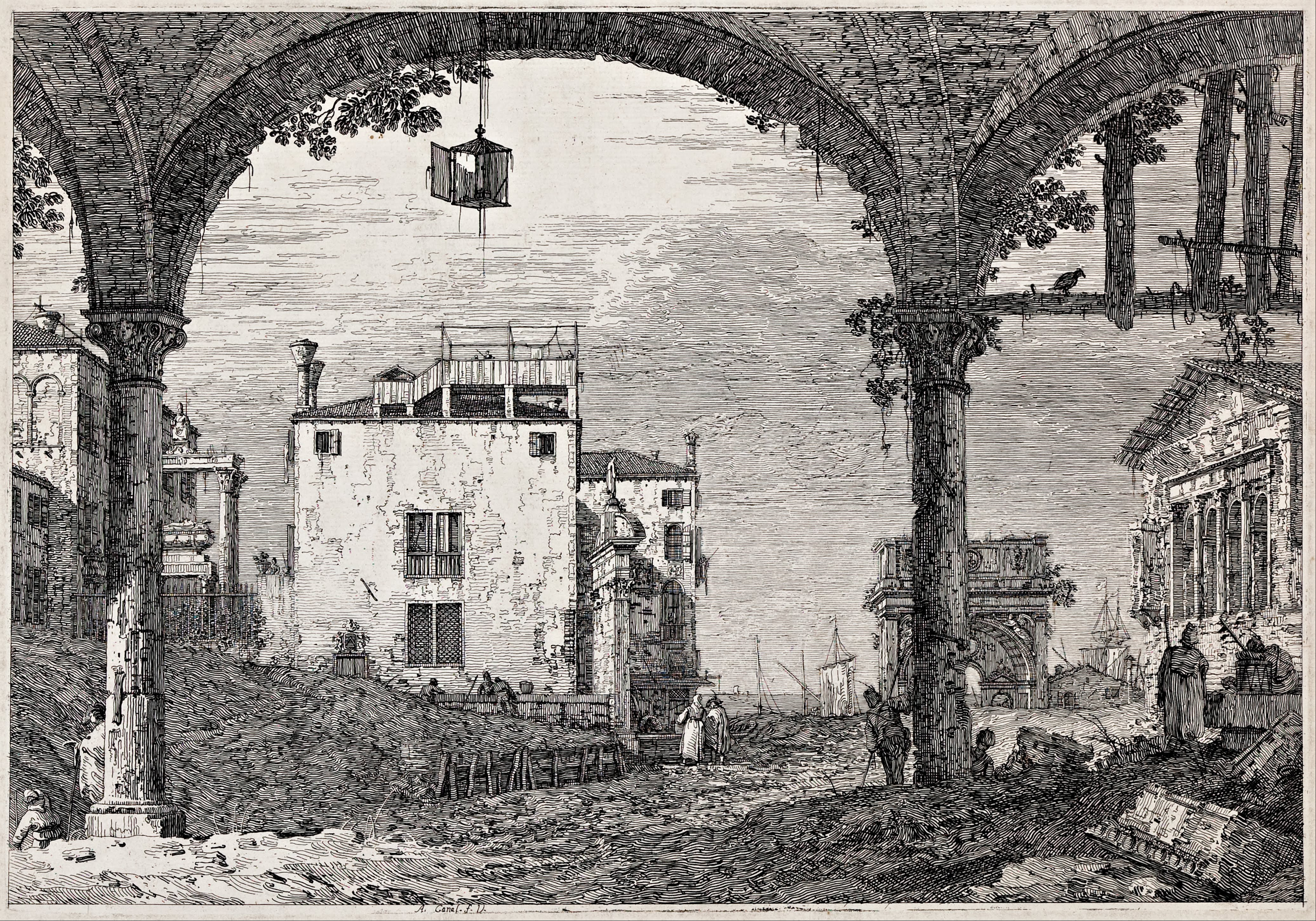
The portico with a lantern, from the series Vedute, c. 1740–1744, etching

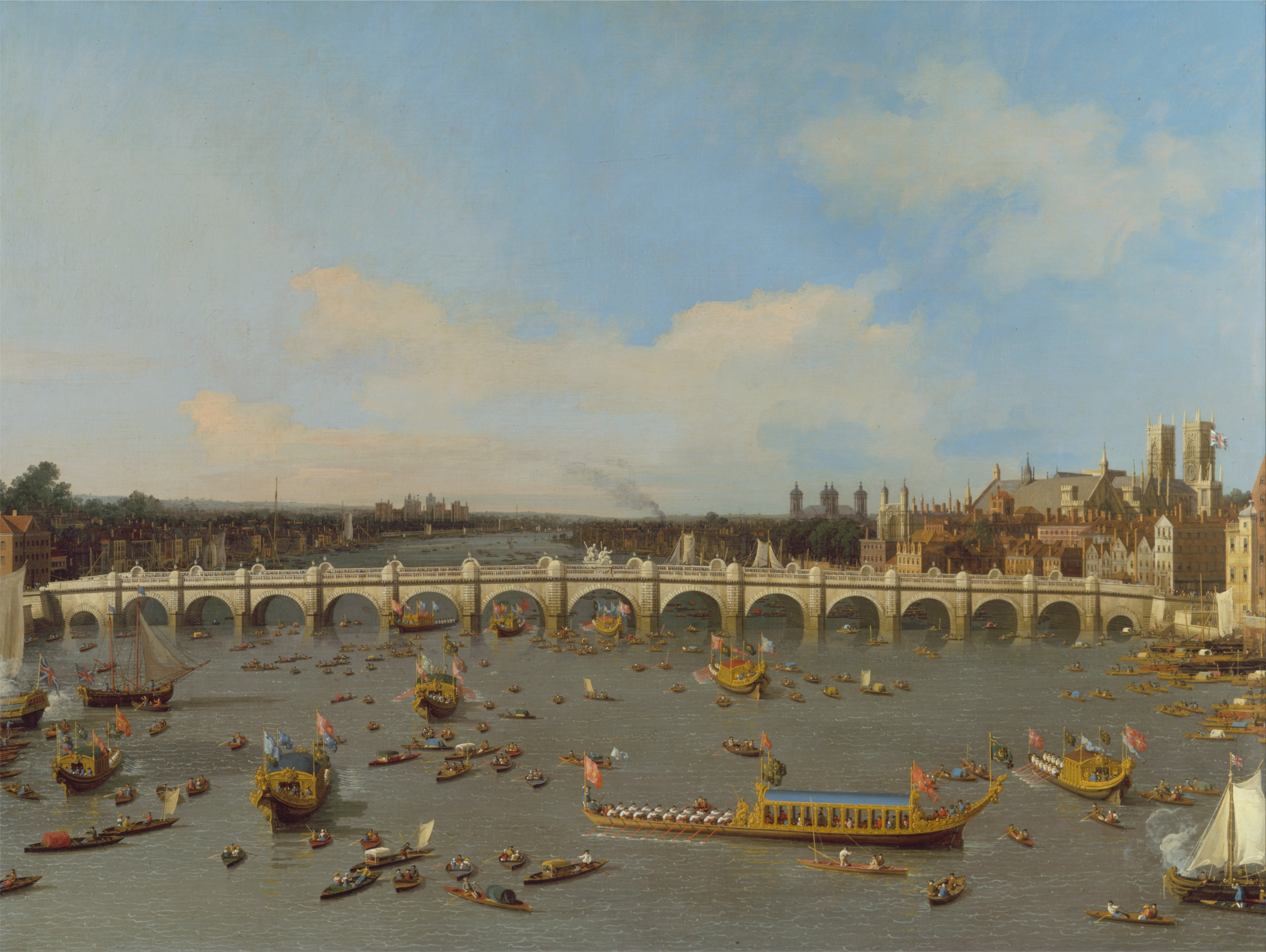
The first Westminster Bridge, 1746

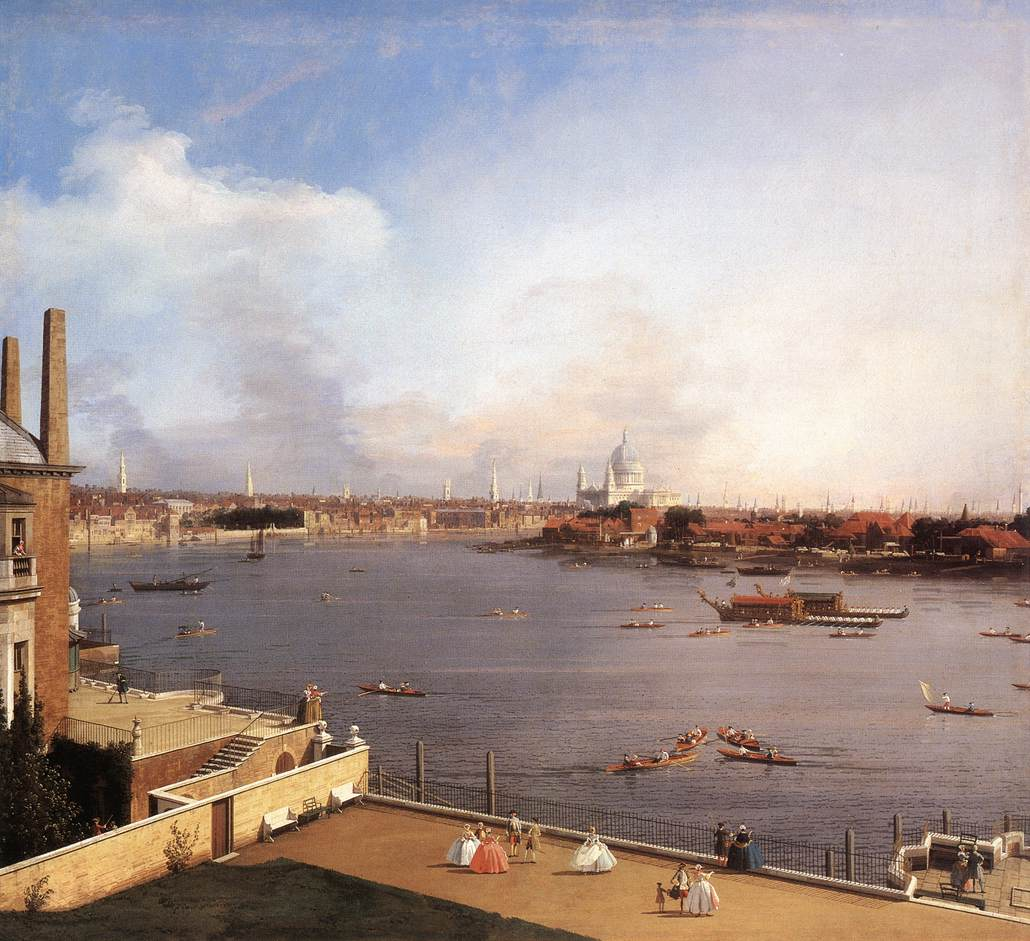
The River Thames from Richmond House: a classic veduta, 1747

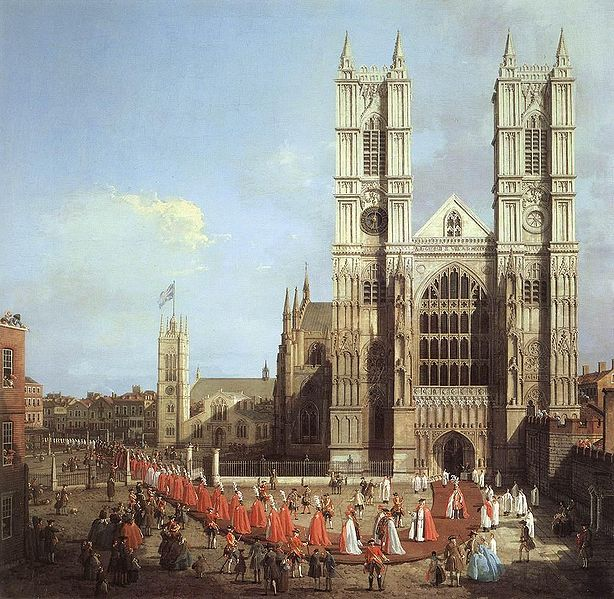
Westminster Abbey with a procession of Knights of the Bath, 1749

Many of his pictures were sold to Englishmen on their Grand Tour, first through the agency of Owen Swiny, and later the banker Joseph Smith. It was Swiny in the late 1720s who encouraged the artist to paint small topographical views of Venice with a commercial appeal for tourists and foreign visitors to the city. Sometime before 1728, Canaletto began his association with Smith, an English businessman and collector living in Venice, who was appointed British Consul in Venice in 1744. Smith later became the artist's principal agent and patron, acquiring nearly fifty paintings, one hundred fifty drawings and fifteen rare etchings from Canaletto, the largest and finest single group of the artist's works, which he sold to King George III in 1763.

In the 1740s, Canaletto's market was disrupted when the War of the Austrian Succession led to a reduction in the number of British visitors to Venice. Smith also arranged for the publication of a series of etchings of "capricci" (or architectural phantasies) (capriccio Italian for fancy) in his vedute ideali, but the returns were not high enough, and in 1746 Canaletto moved to London, to be closer to his market.

Whilst in England, between 1749 and 1752 Canaletto lived at number 41 Beak Street in London's Soho district.

He remained in England until 1755, producing views of London (including several of the new Westminster Bridge, which was completed during his stay) and of his patrons' houses and castles. These included Northumberland House for Sir Hugh Smithson, Bt., who by marriage later became the 2nd Earl of Northumberland; and Warwick Castle for Lord Brooke, later 1st Earl of Warwick. Smithson was one of the commissioners of Westminster Bridge, and it is "not impossible" that he had encouraged Canaletto to come to England and record the beginning of the bridge's life. His 1754 painting of Old Walton Bridge includes an image of Canaletto himself.

He was often expected to paint England in the fashion with which he had painted his native city. Canaletto's painting began to suffer from repetitiveness, losing its fluidity, and becoming mechanical to the point that the English art critic George Vertue suggested that the man painting under the name 'Canaletto' was an impostor. This may have been because Canaletto's nephew, Bernardo Bellotto, was also using his uncle's nickname; or more likely because the story had been spread by unscrupulous art dealers who had been passing off copies of Canaletto's own work and were anxious to see him return to Venice. Historian Michael Levey described his work from this period as "inhibited".

In order to refute this claim the artist, through an advertisement in a newspaper, invited "any Gentleman" to inspect his latest painting of St. James's Park at his studio in Silver Street (now Beak Street) off Golden Square; however, his reputation never fully recovered in his lifetime.

After his return to Venice, Canaletto was elected to the Venetian Academy in 1763 and appointed prior of the Collegio dei Pittori. He continued to paint until his death in 1768. In his later years, he often worked from old sketches, but he sometimes produced surprising new compositions. He was willing to make subtle alterations to topography for artistic effect.

He was buried at San Lio, Venice, the church where he was baptized.

== Market ==
His students included his nephew Bernardo Bellotto, Francesco Guardi, Michele Marieschi, Gabriele Bella and Giuseppe Moretti. The painter, Giuseppe Bernardino Bison, was a follower of his style.

Joseph Smith sold much of his collection to George III, creating the bulk of the large collection of works by Canaletto owned by the Royal Collection. In 1762, George III paid £20,000 for Consul Smith's collection of 50 paintings and 142 drawings. There are many examples of his work in other British collections, including several (19) at the Wallace Collection and a set of 24 in the dining room at Woburn Abbey. A large set of Canaletto works was also part of the collection of the Earls of Carlisle, however many were lost at the 1940 fire at Castle Howard and others were sold over the last century. Among those formerly at the Carlisle collection are The Bacino di San Marco: looking East, now at the Museum of Fine Arts, Boston (sold in 1939) and the pair Entrance to the Grand Canal from the Molo, Venice and The Square of Saint Mark's, Venice, now at the National Gallery of Art, Washington DC (sold in 1938). The last important venetian veduta at Castle Howard was by Bernardo Bellotto, A View of the Grand Canal Looking South from the Palazzo Foscari, which was sold at Sotheby's in July 2015 for £2.6 million.

Canaletto's views always fetched high prices, and as early as the 18th century Catherine the Great and other European monarchs vied for his grandest paintings. The record price paid at auction for a Canaletto was previously £18.6 million for View of the Grand Canal from Palazzo Balbi to the Rialto, set at Sotheby's in London in July 2005. In July 2025, Venice, the Return of the Bucintoro on Ascension Day reached £27.5 million, or £31.9 million with fees, at Christie's in London.

== Gallery ==
=== Italy ===
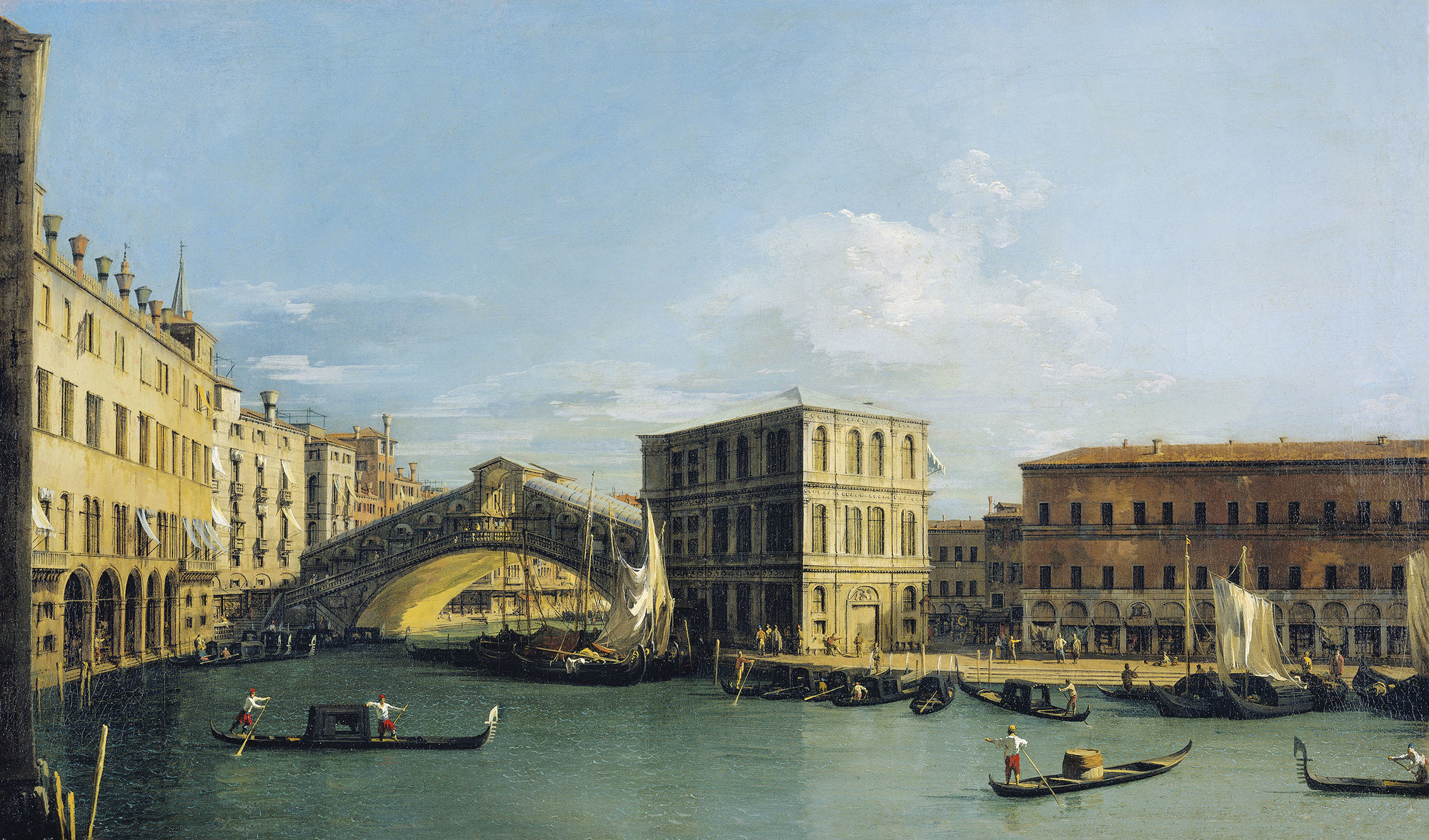
Rialto Bridge from the North, 1726

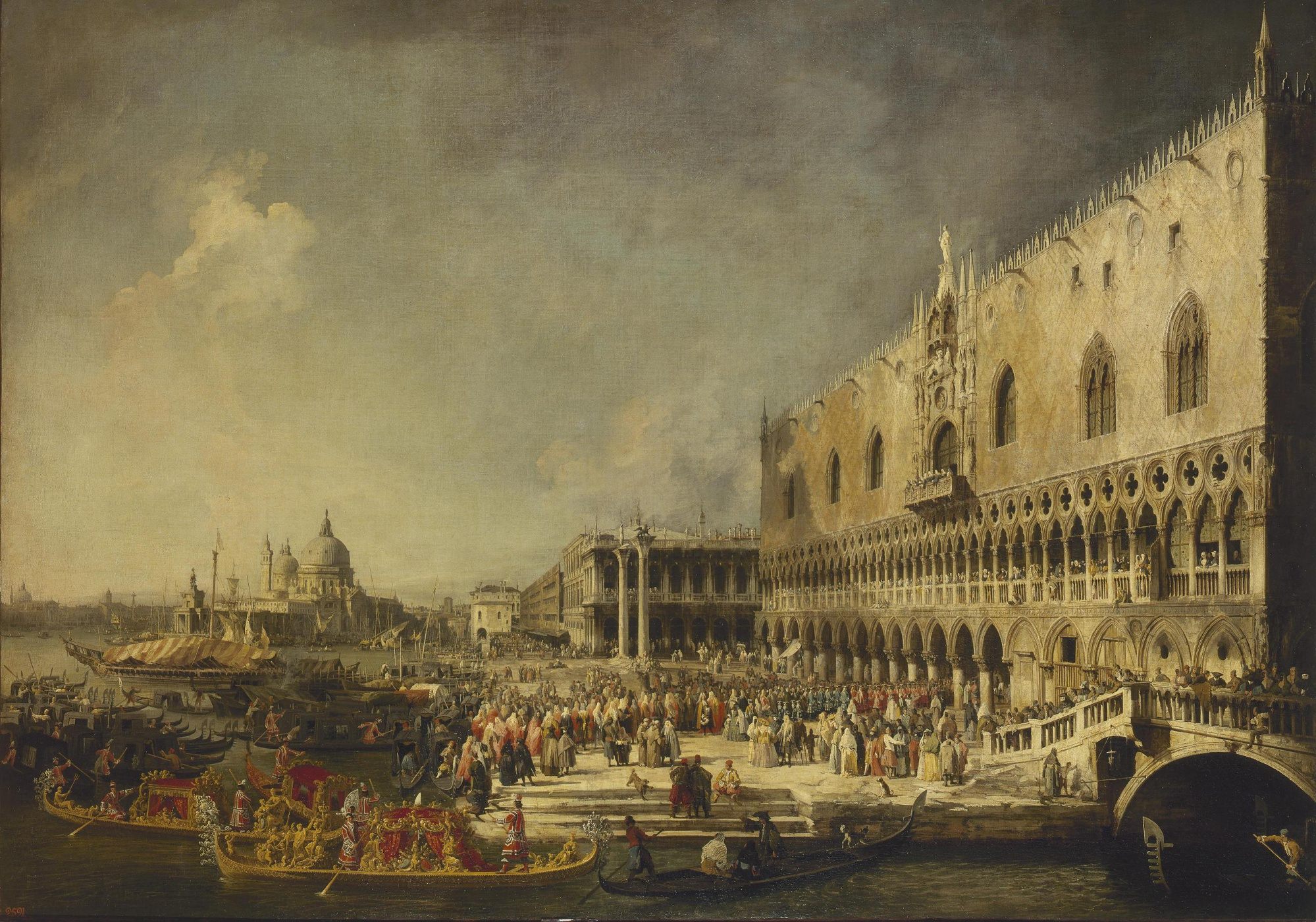
The French Ambassador's Arrival in Venice, 1726-1727

The Bucentaur Returns to the Pier at the Doge's Palace, 1730

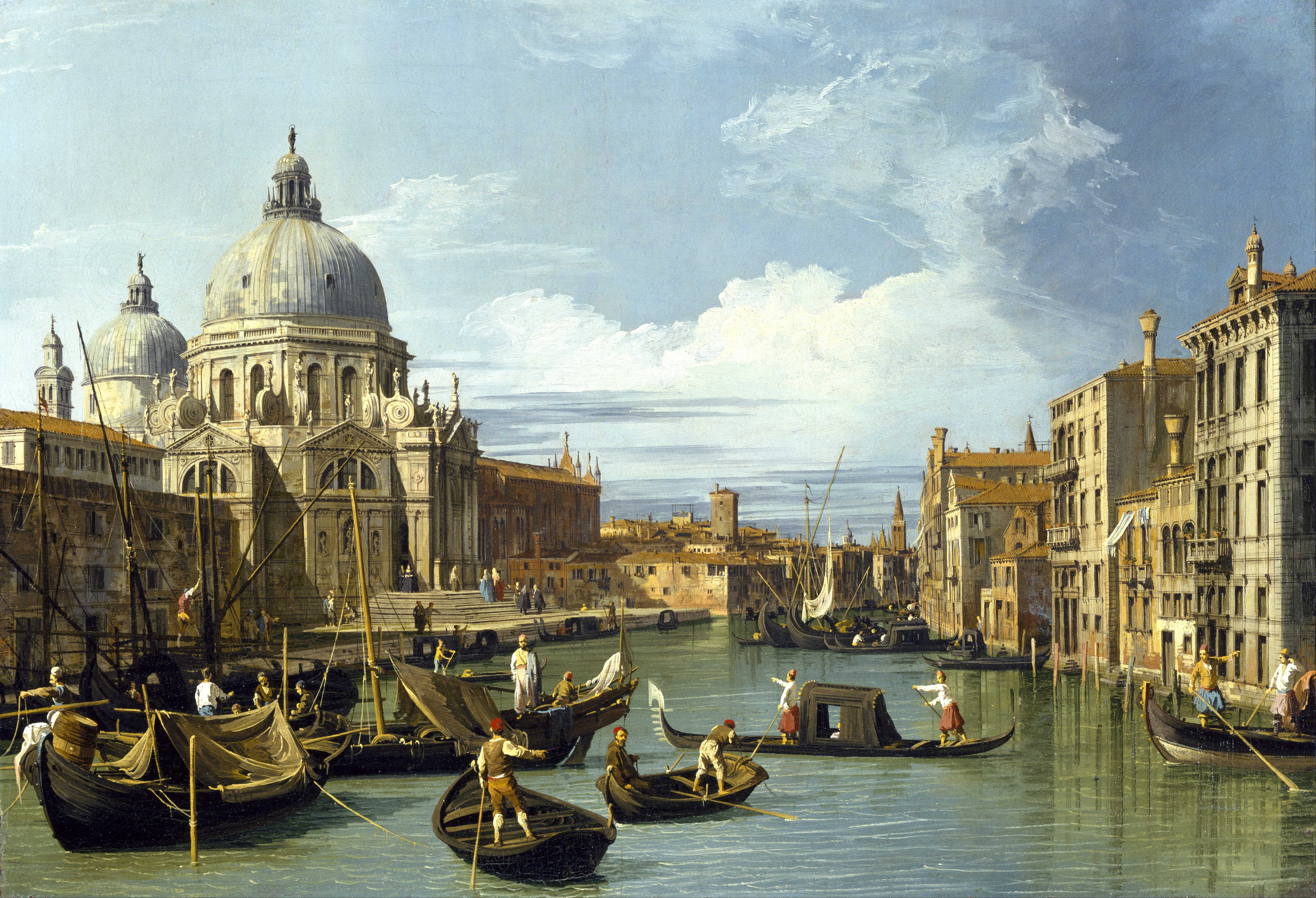
The Entrance to the Grand Canal, 1730

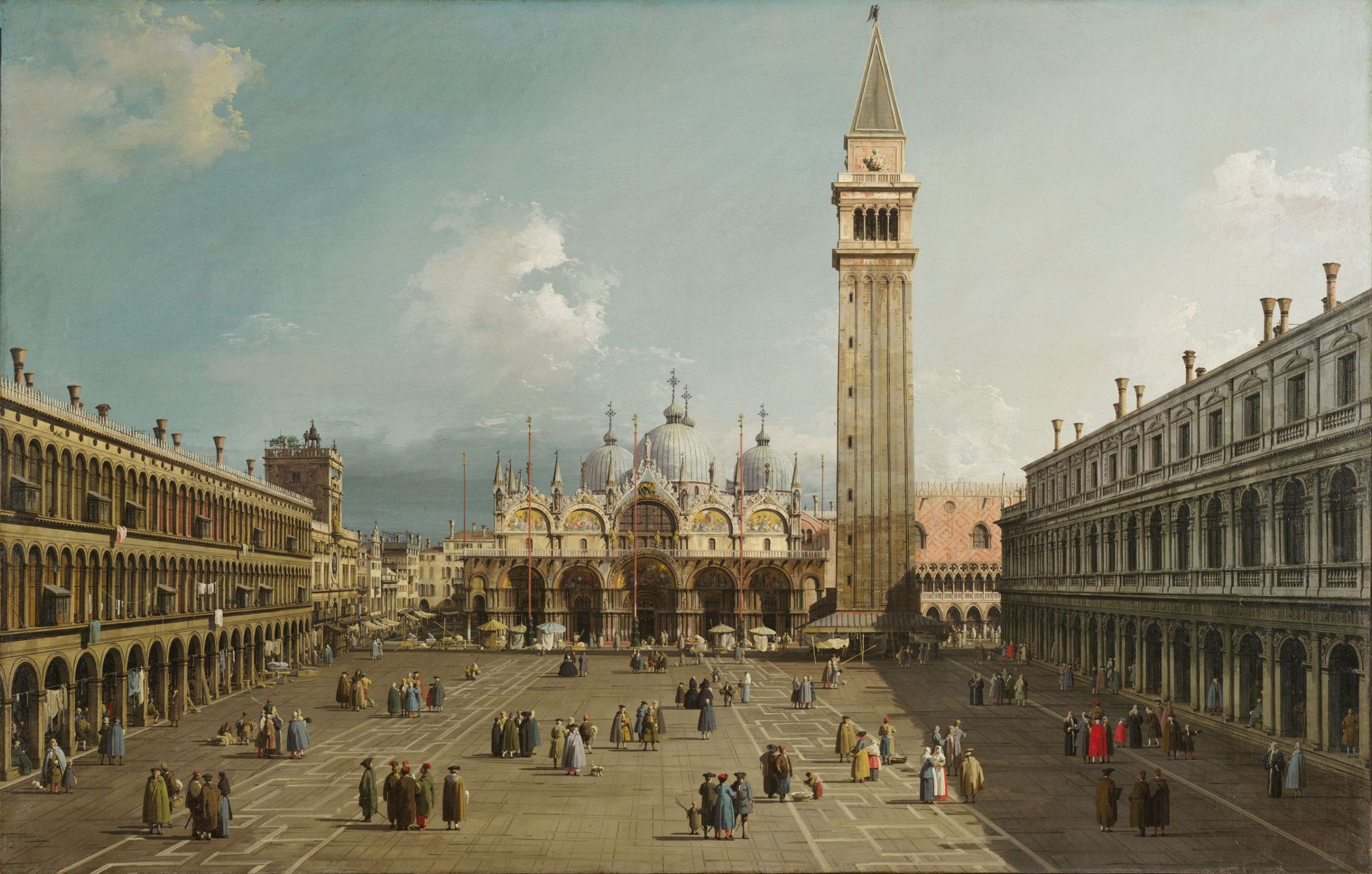
Piazza San Marco, Venice, 1730

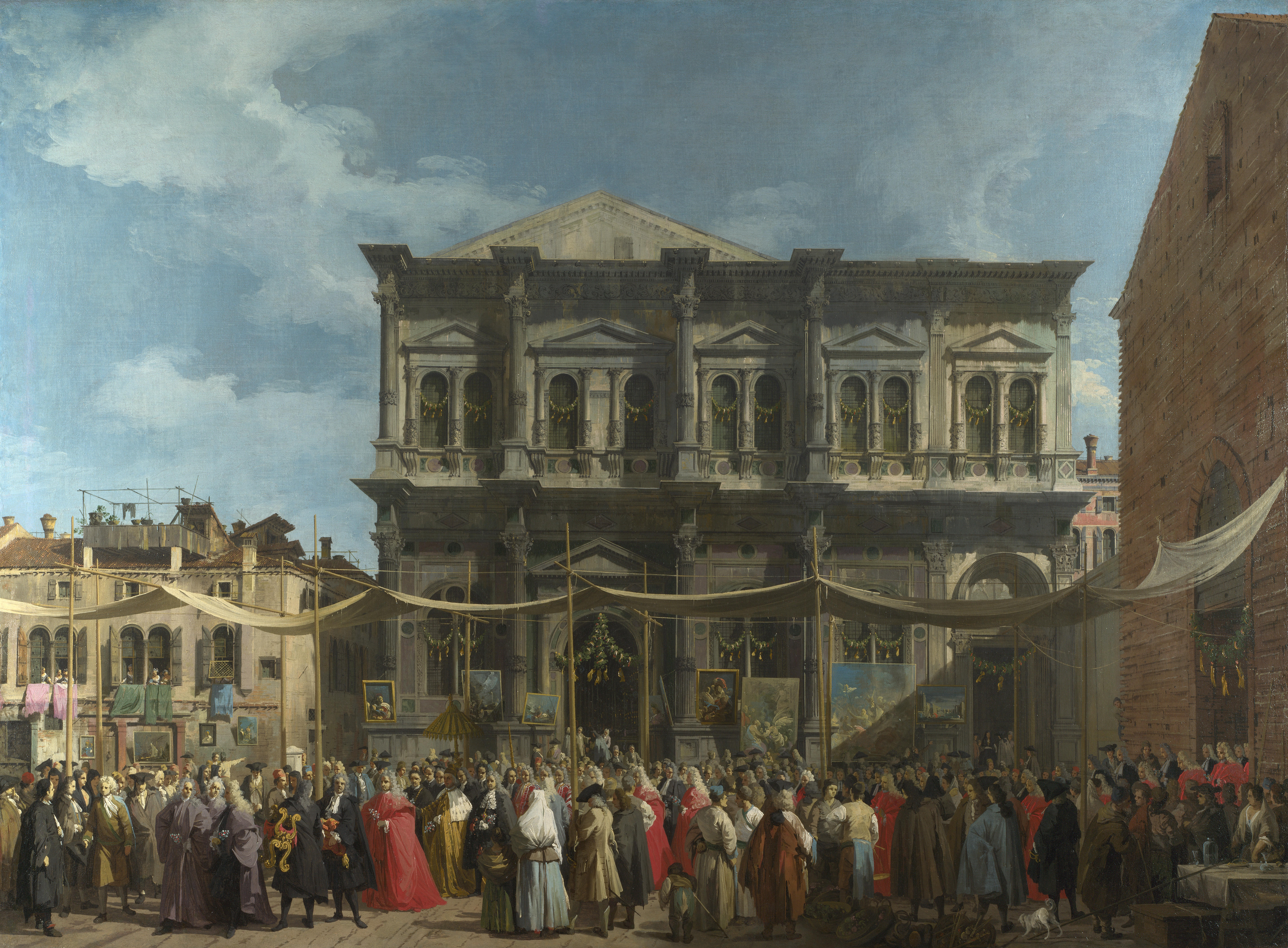
The Feast Day of Saint Roch, 1735

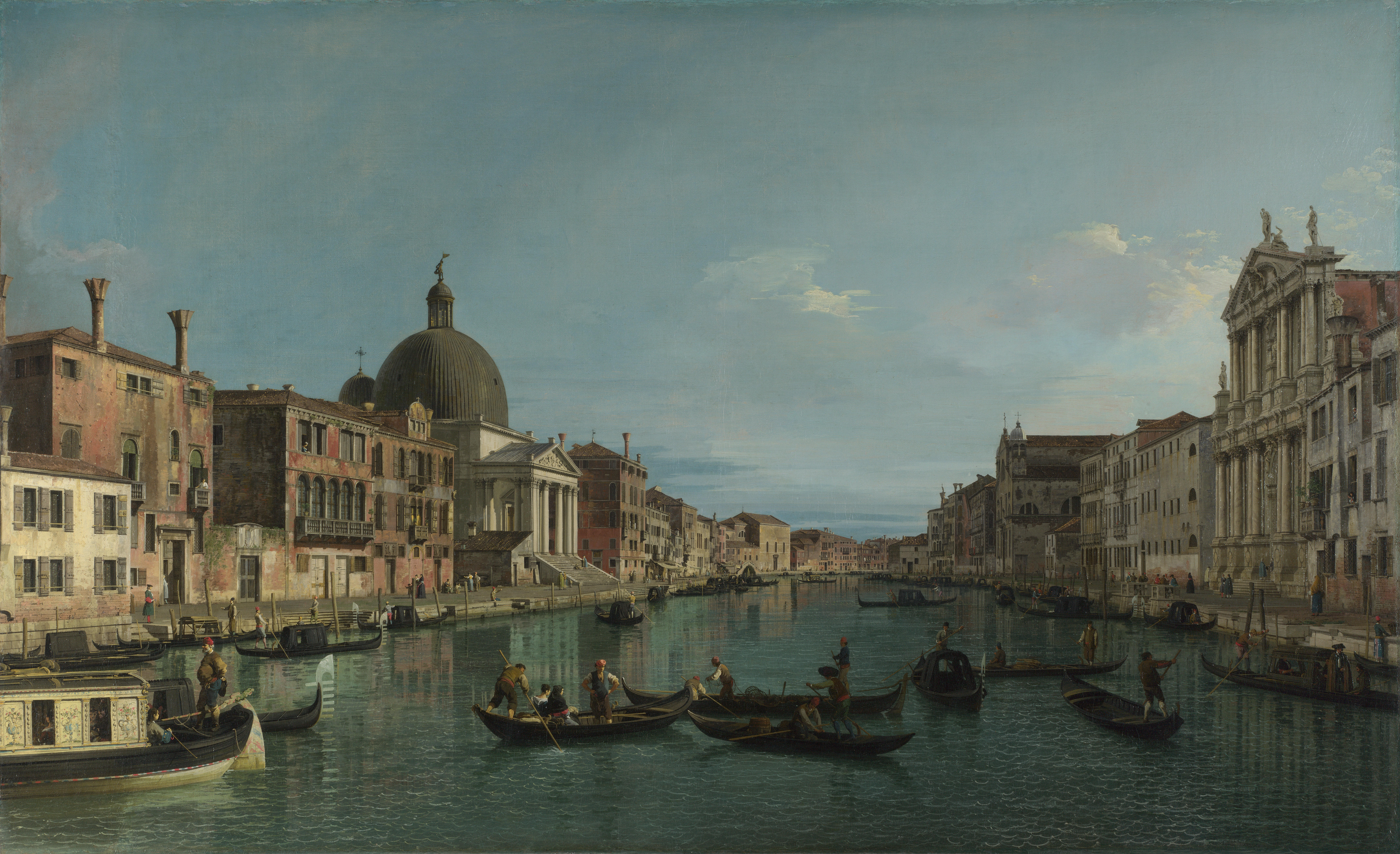
The Grand Canal with San Simeone Piccolo, 1740

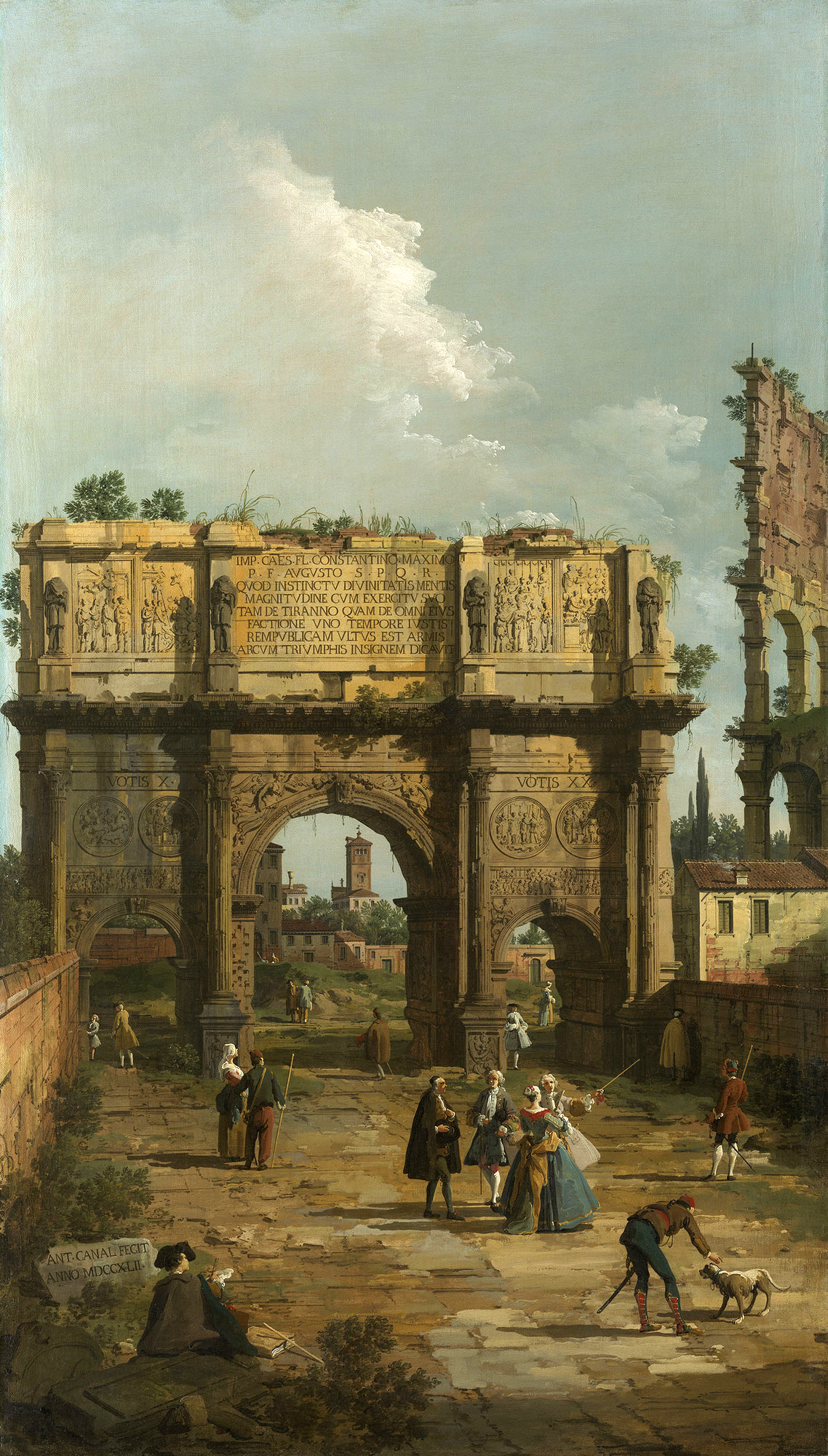
The Arch of Constantine, Rome, 1742

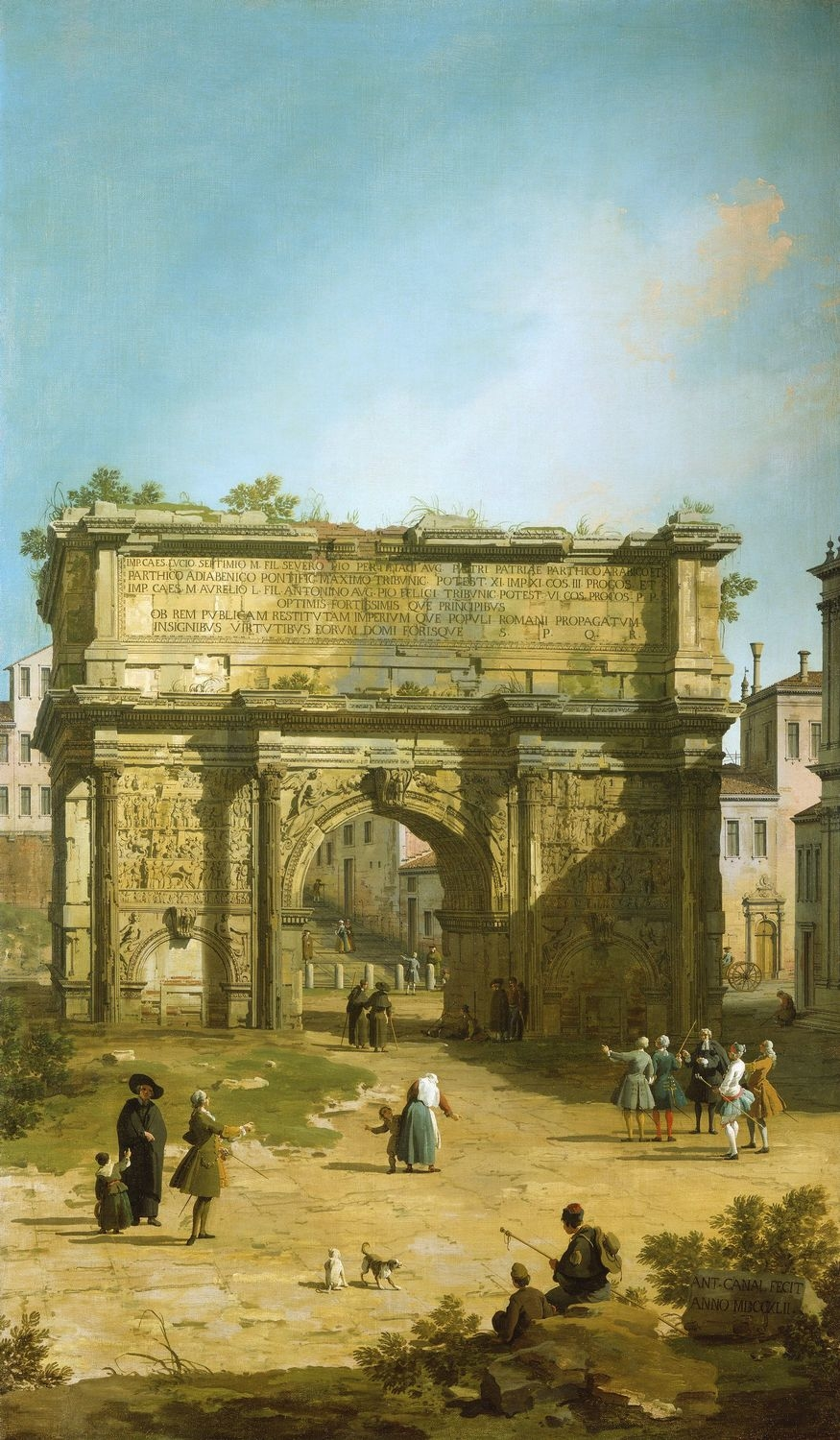
The Arch of Septimius Severus, 1742

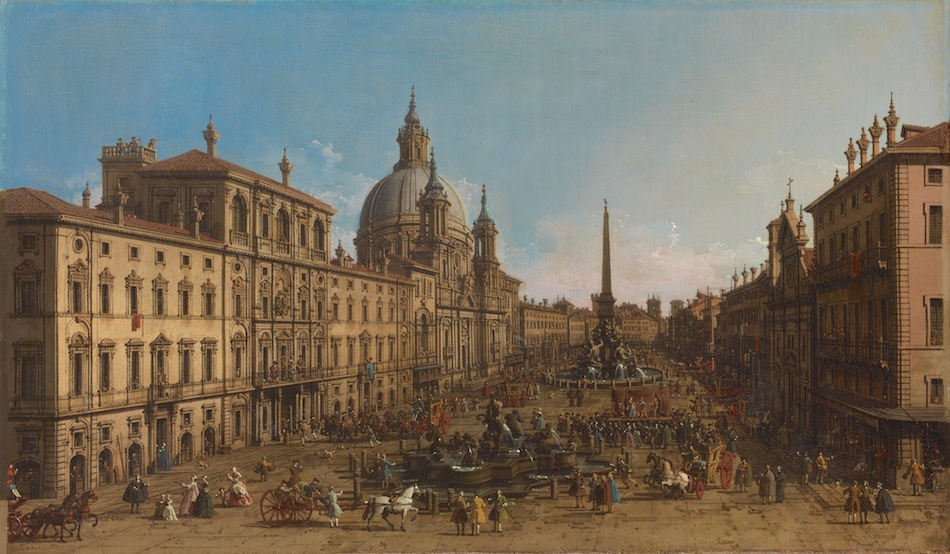
Piazza Navona in Rome, 1750

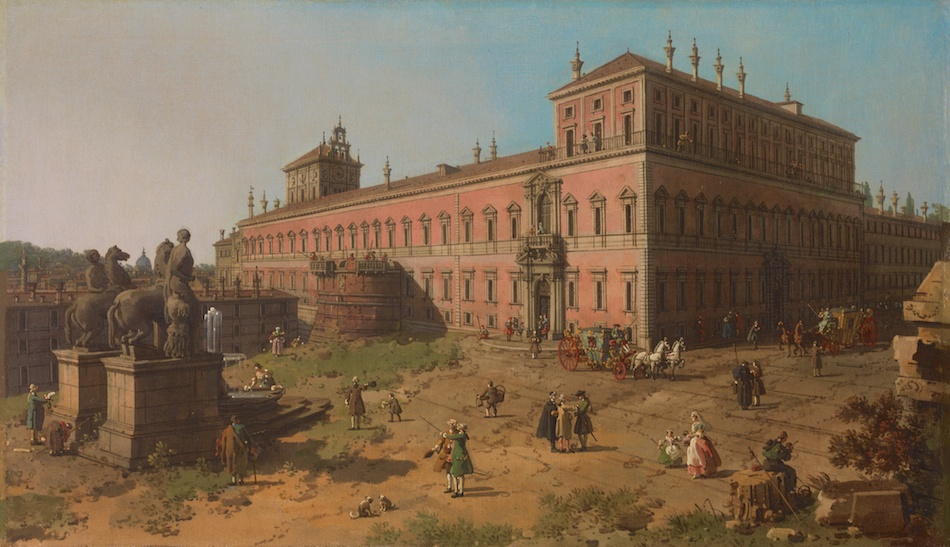
The Piazza del Quirinale, 1750

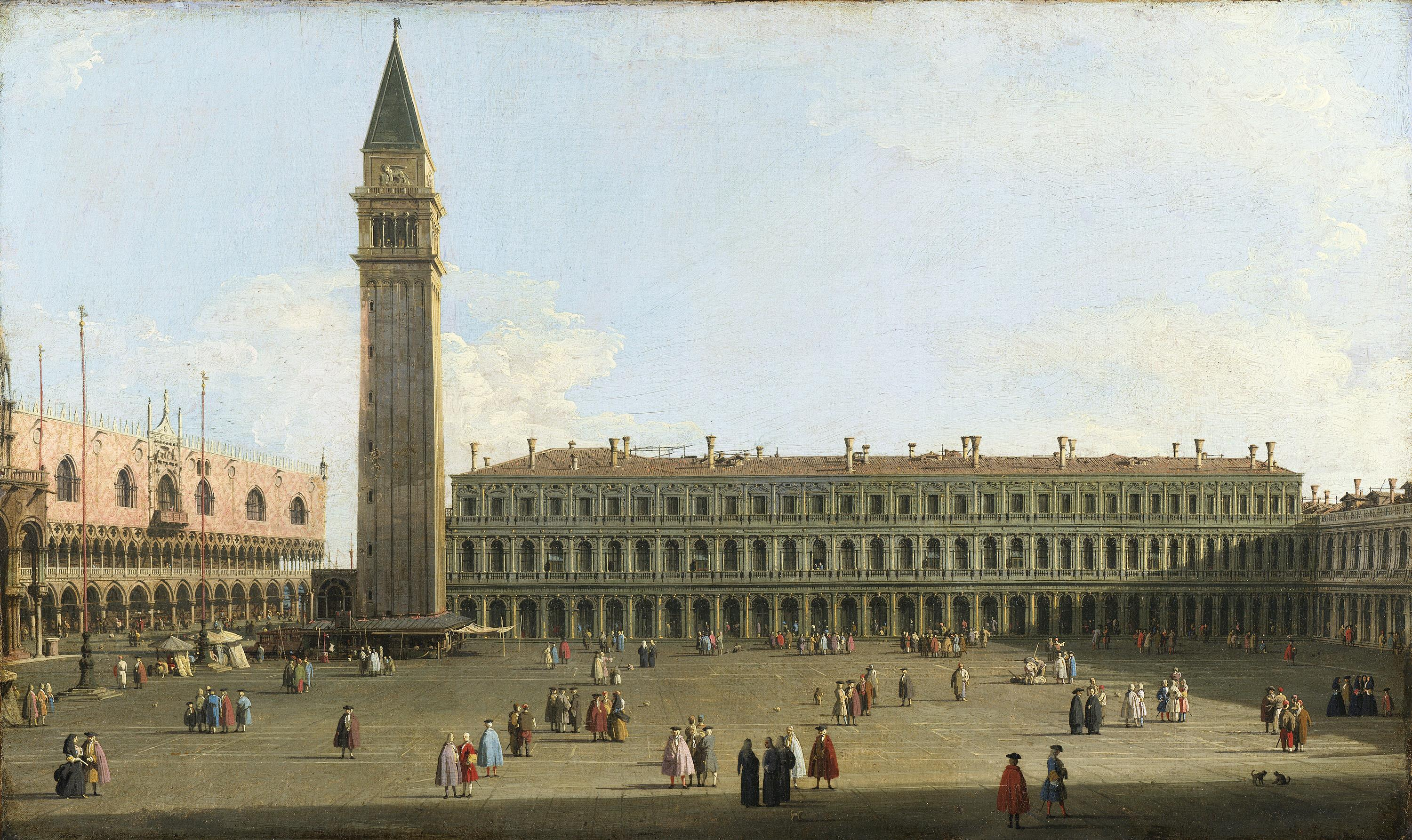
Saint Mark's Square, Venice, 1756

Capriccio with Palladian buildings, c.1756-59

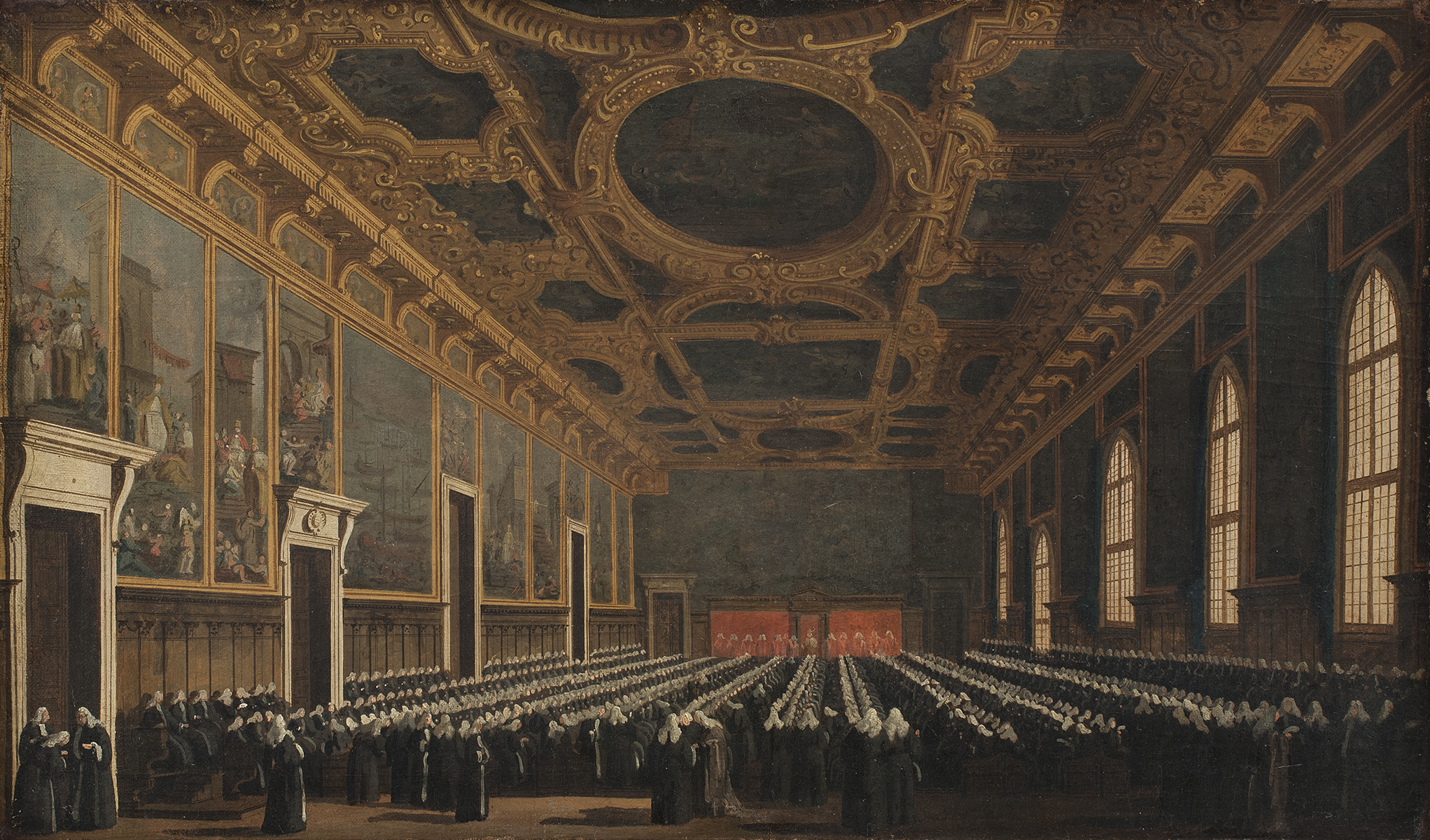
The Doge and Grand Council in Sala del Maggior Consiglio, 1763

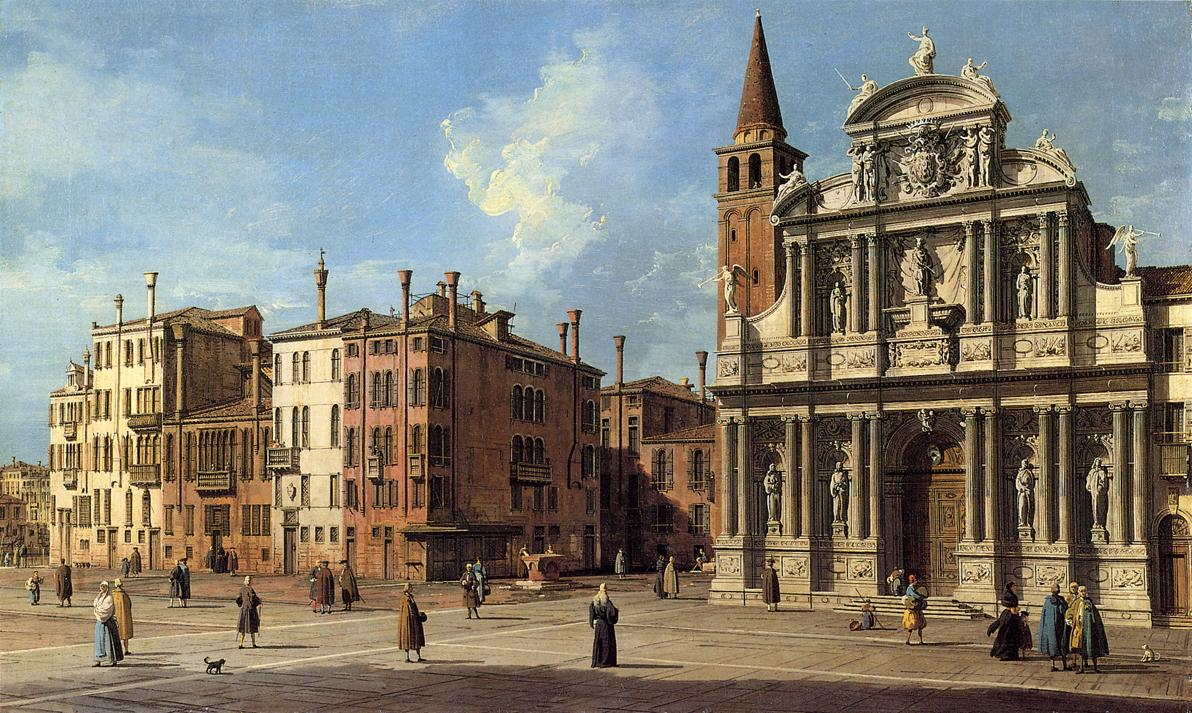
Santa Maria Zobenigo, c.1765

=== England ===
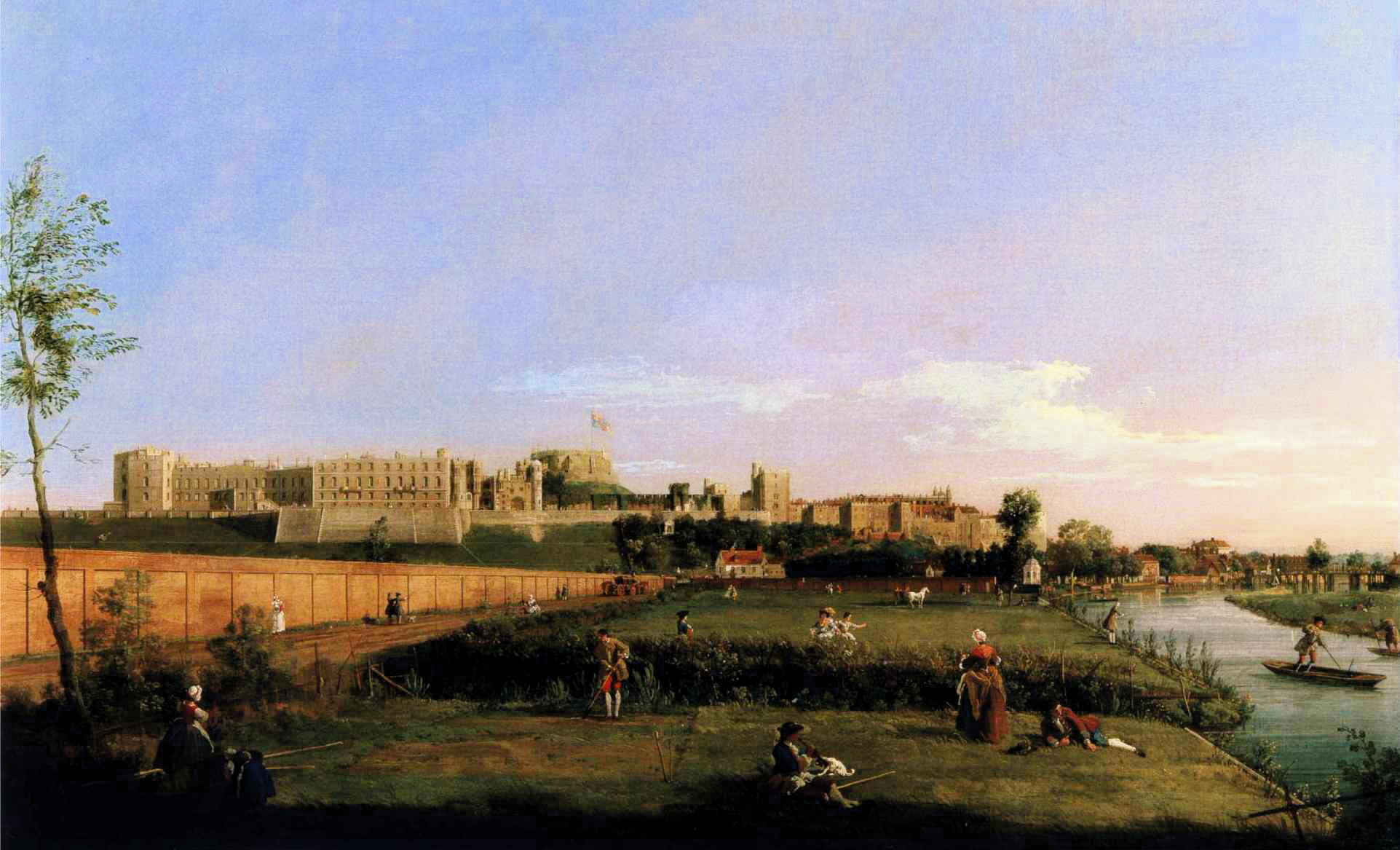
Windsor Castle 1747

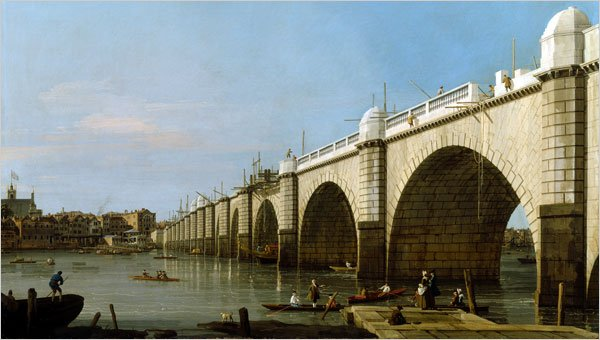
Westminster Bridge Under Construction, 1747

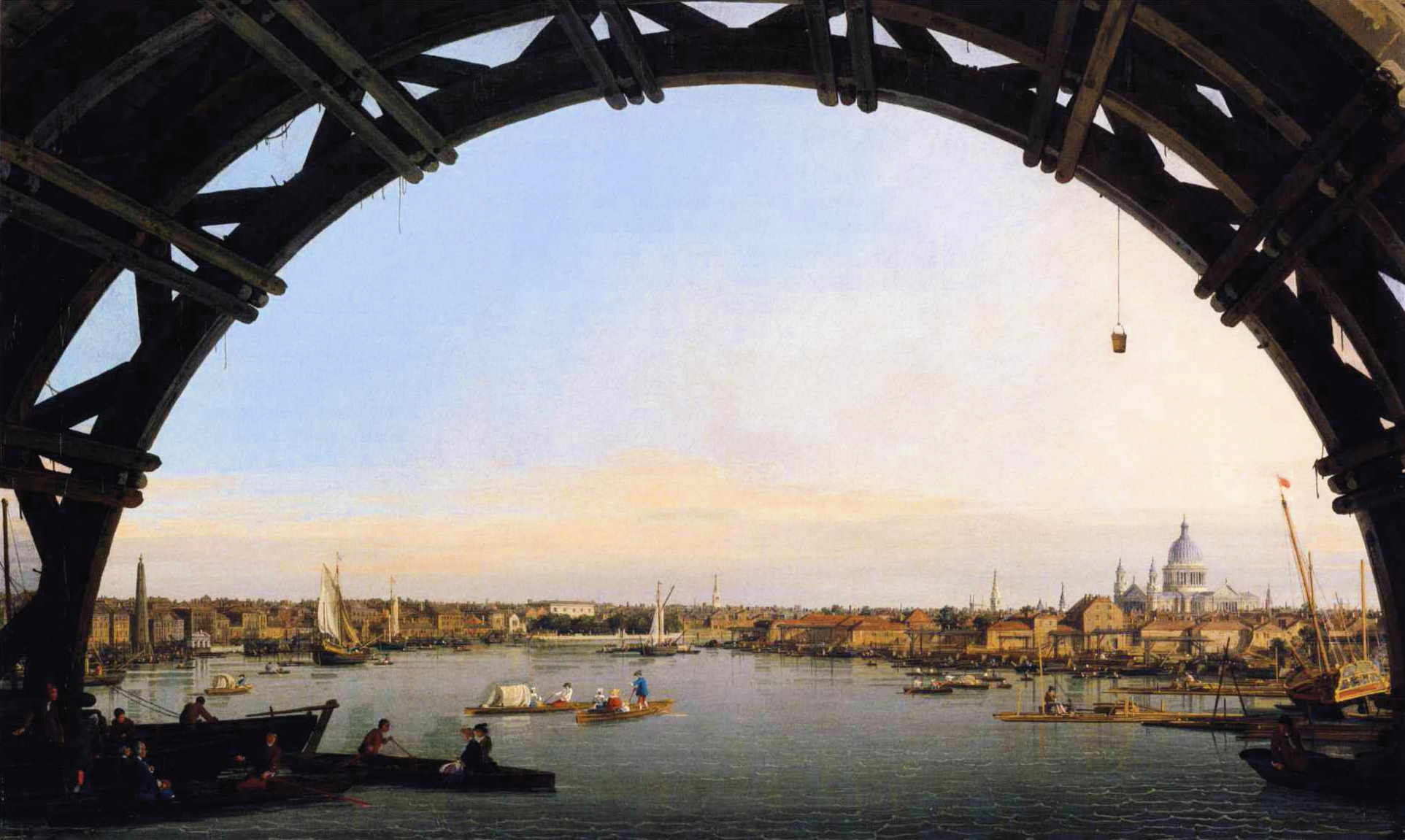
London Seen Through an Arch of Westminster Bridge, 1747

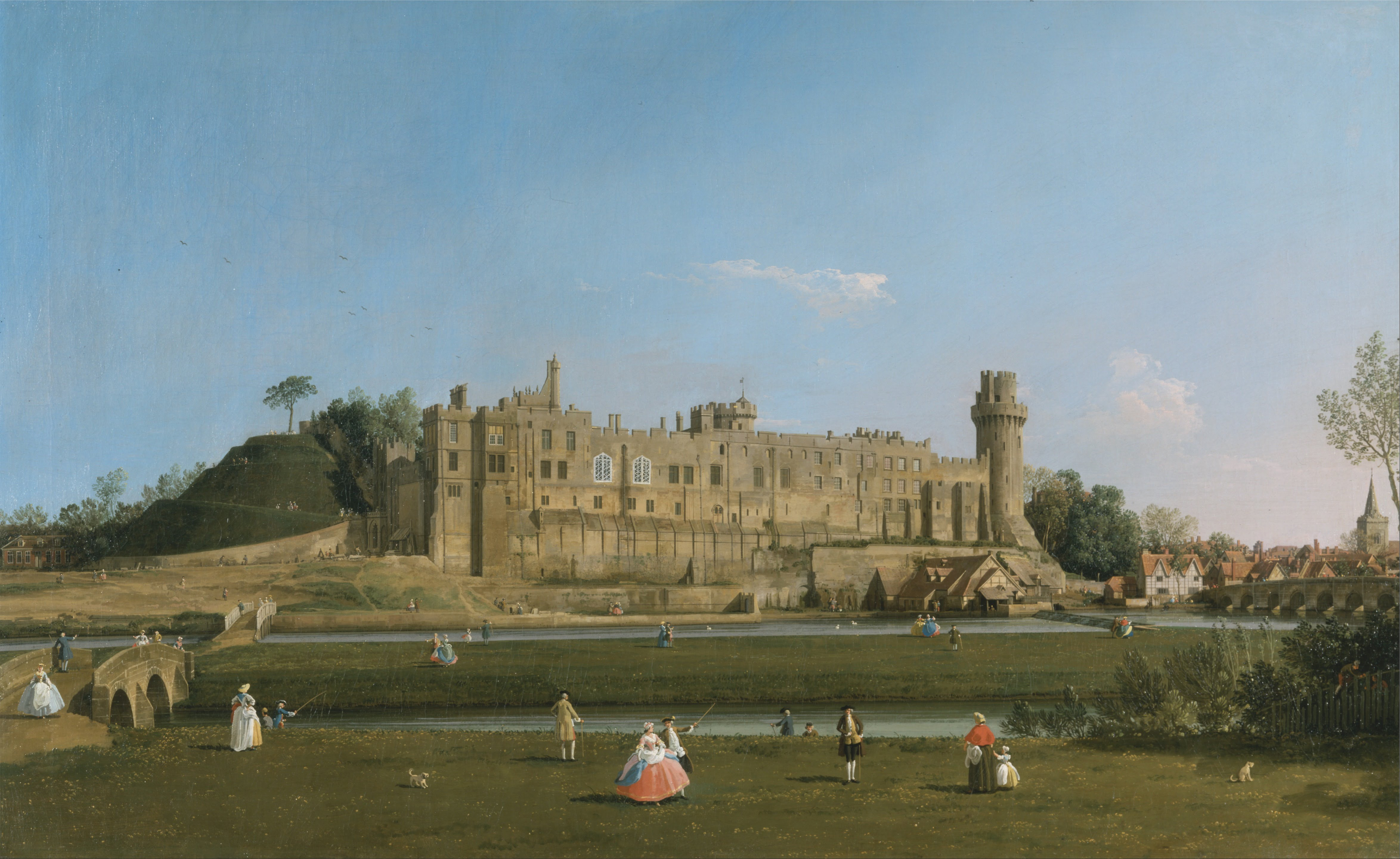
Warwick Castle, c.1748

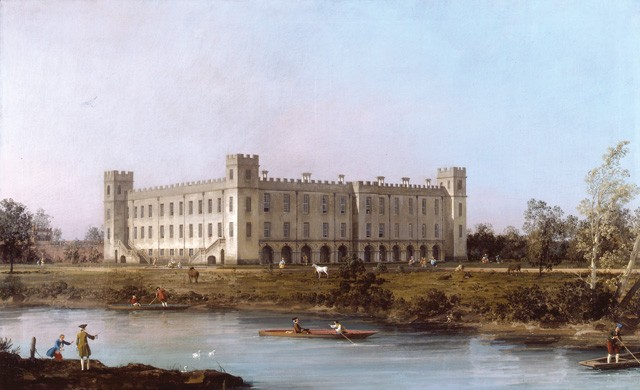
Syon House, 1749

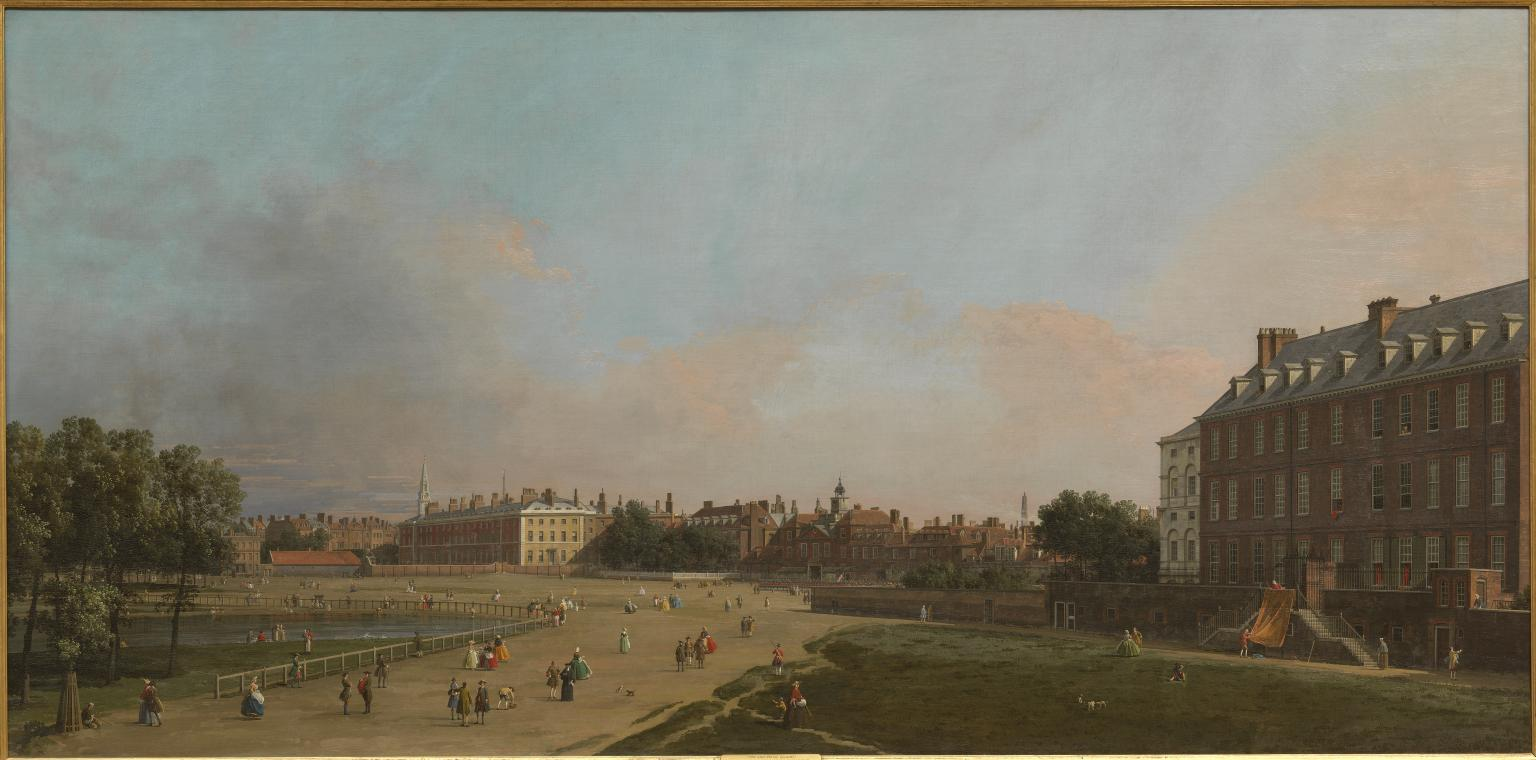
Old Horse Guards, 1749

Greenwich Hospital, 1750

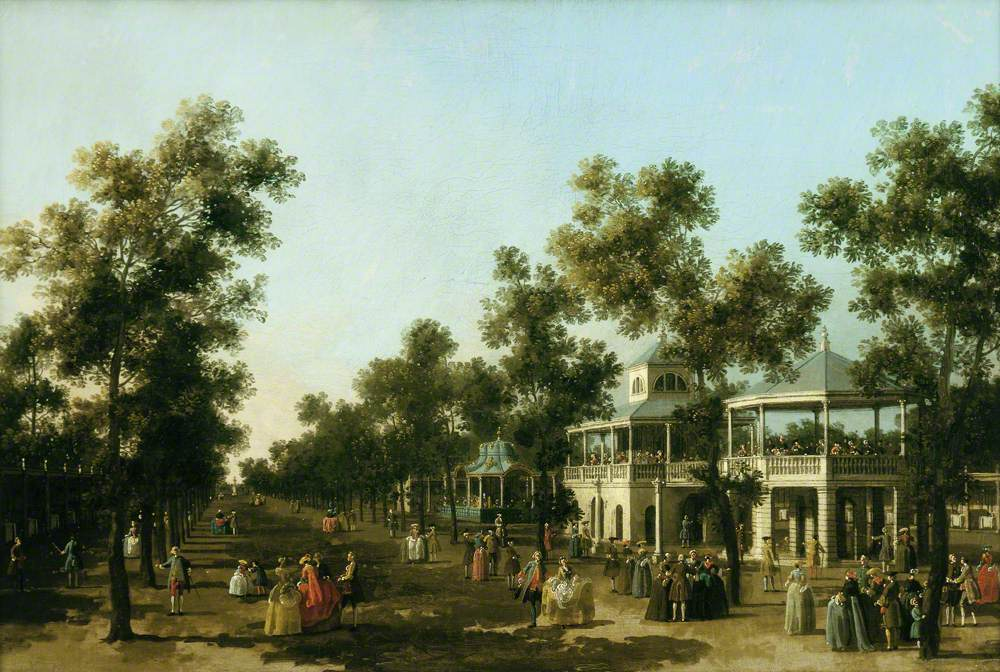
The Grand Walk, Vauxhall Gardens, 1751

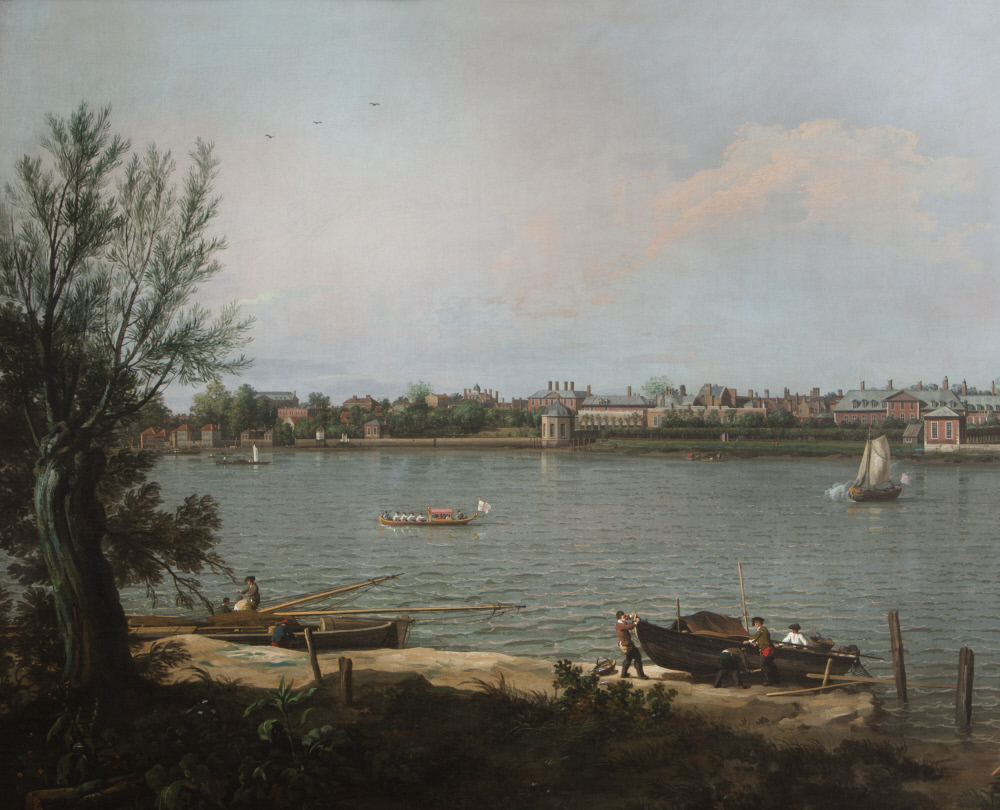
Chelsea from the Thames at Battersea Reach, 1751

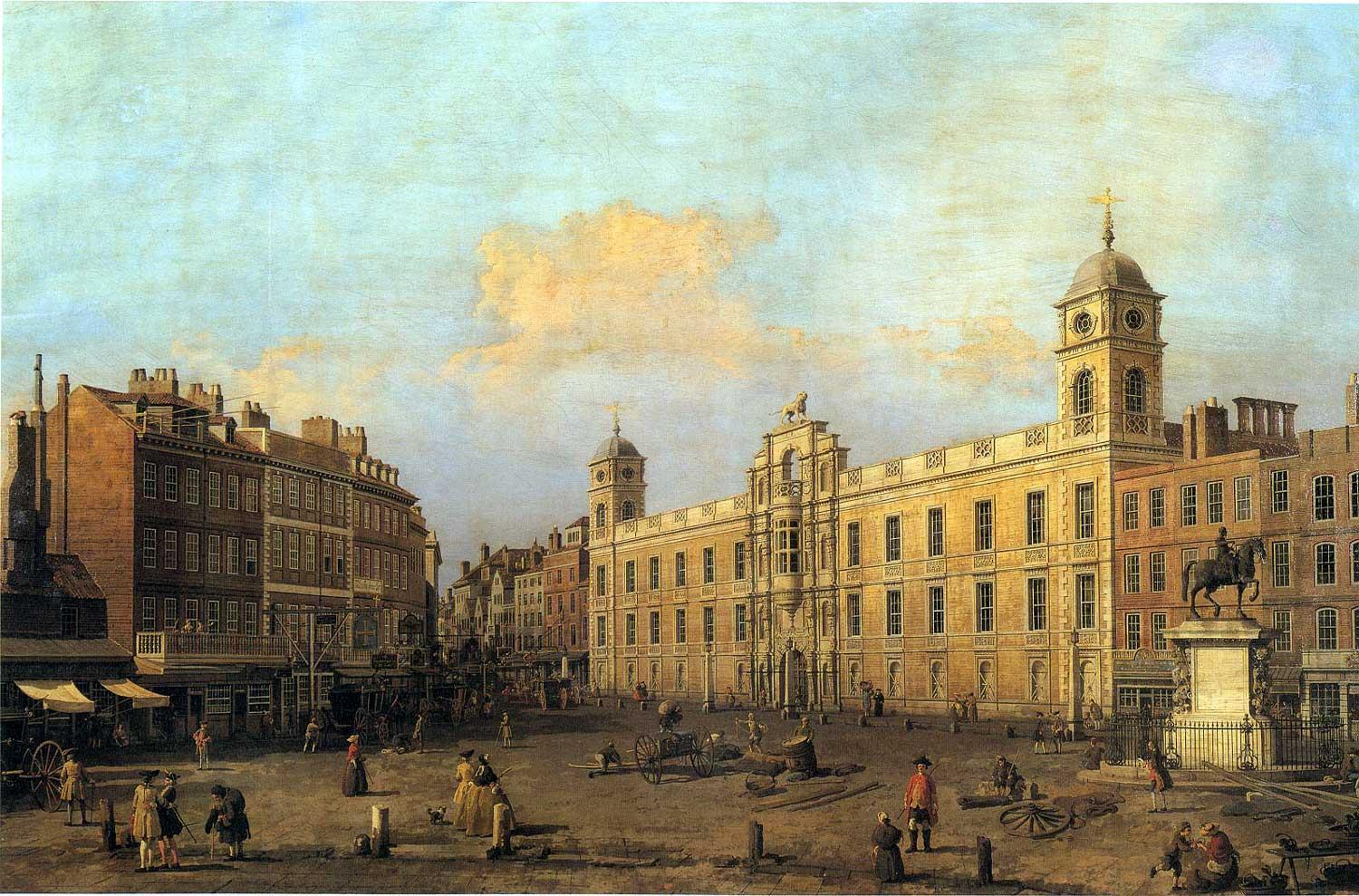
Northumberland House, 1752

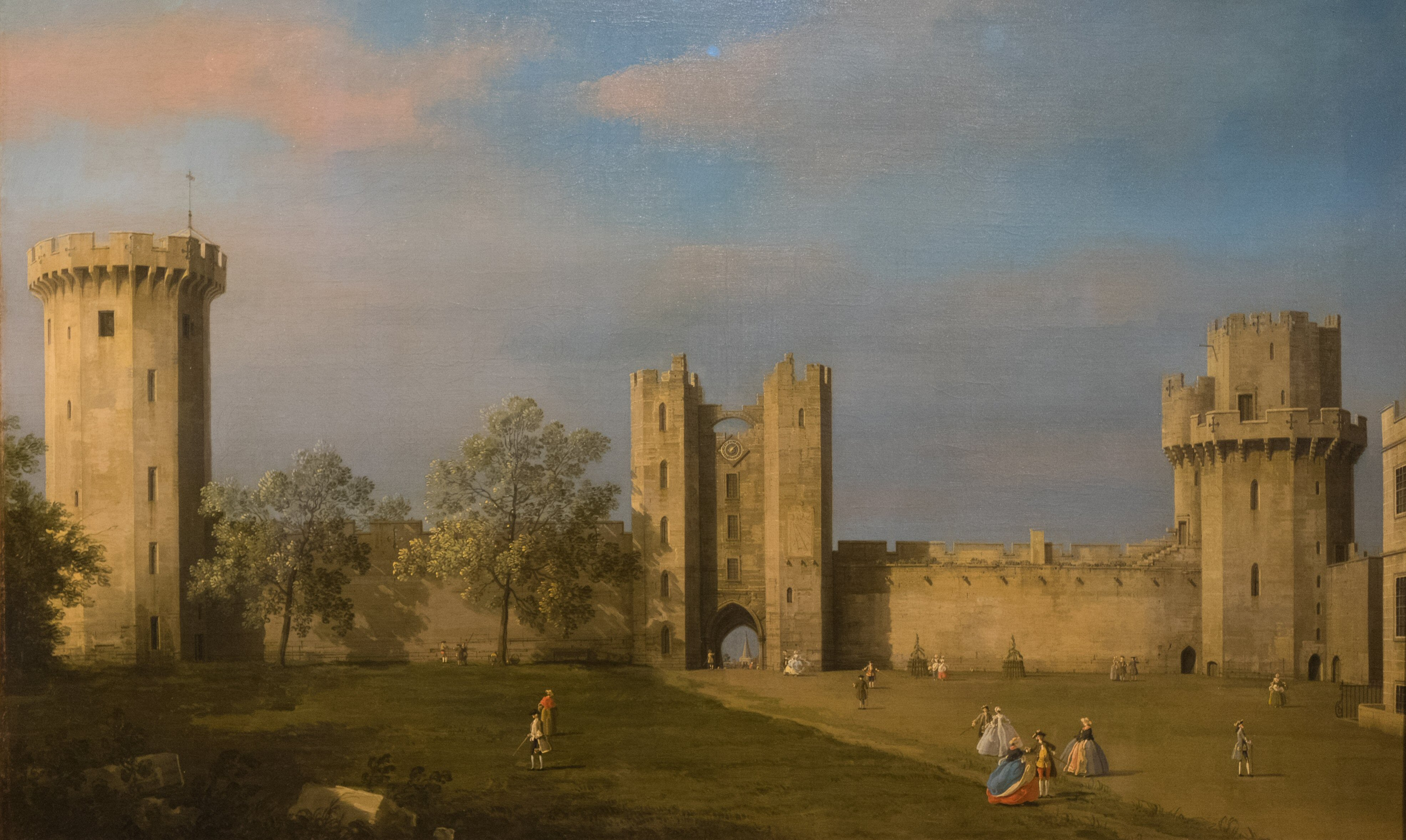
Warwick Castle, East Front from the Courtyard, 1752

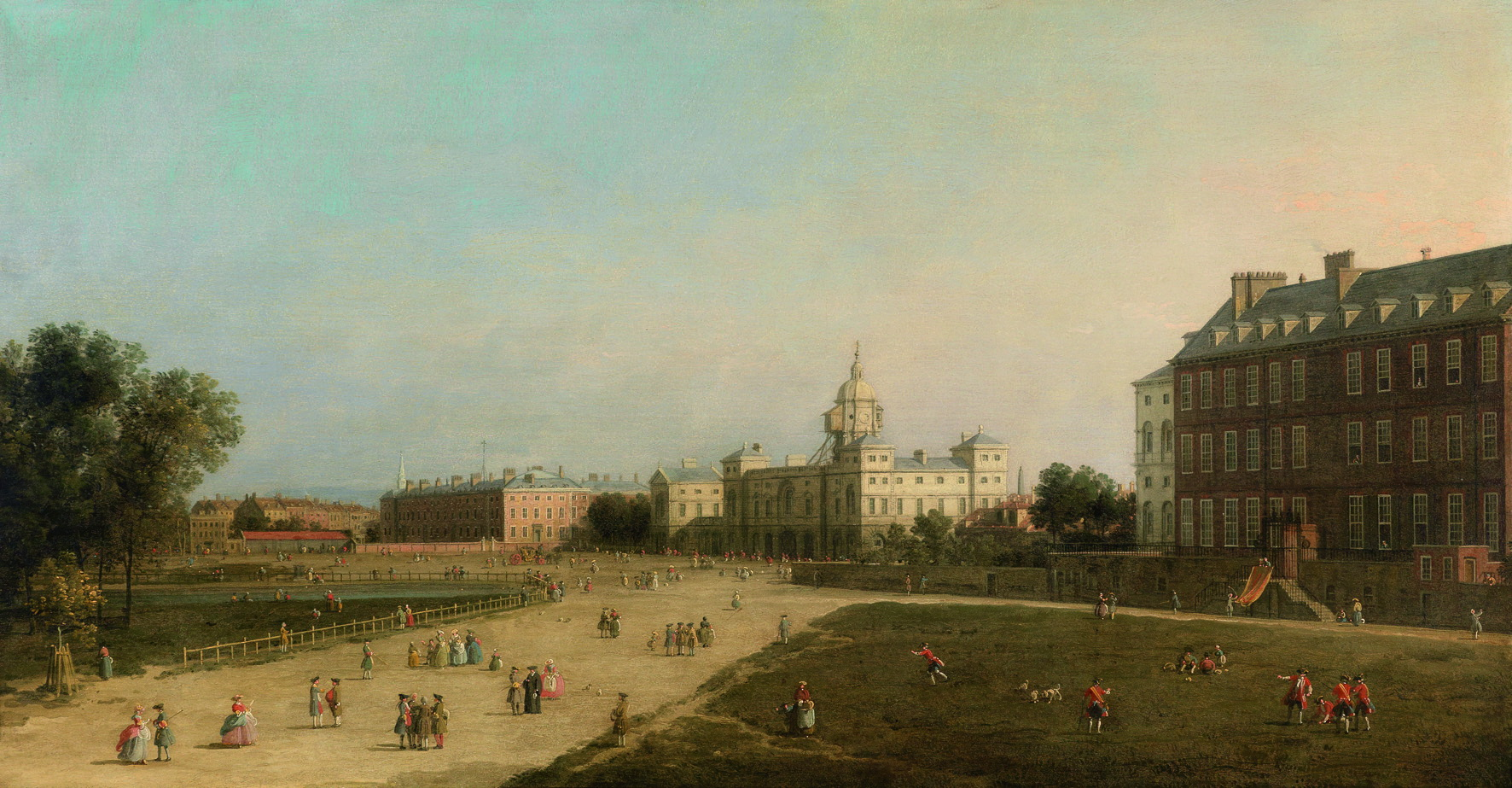
New Horse Guards, 1753

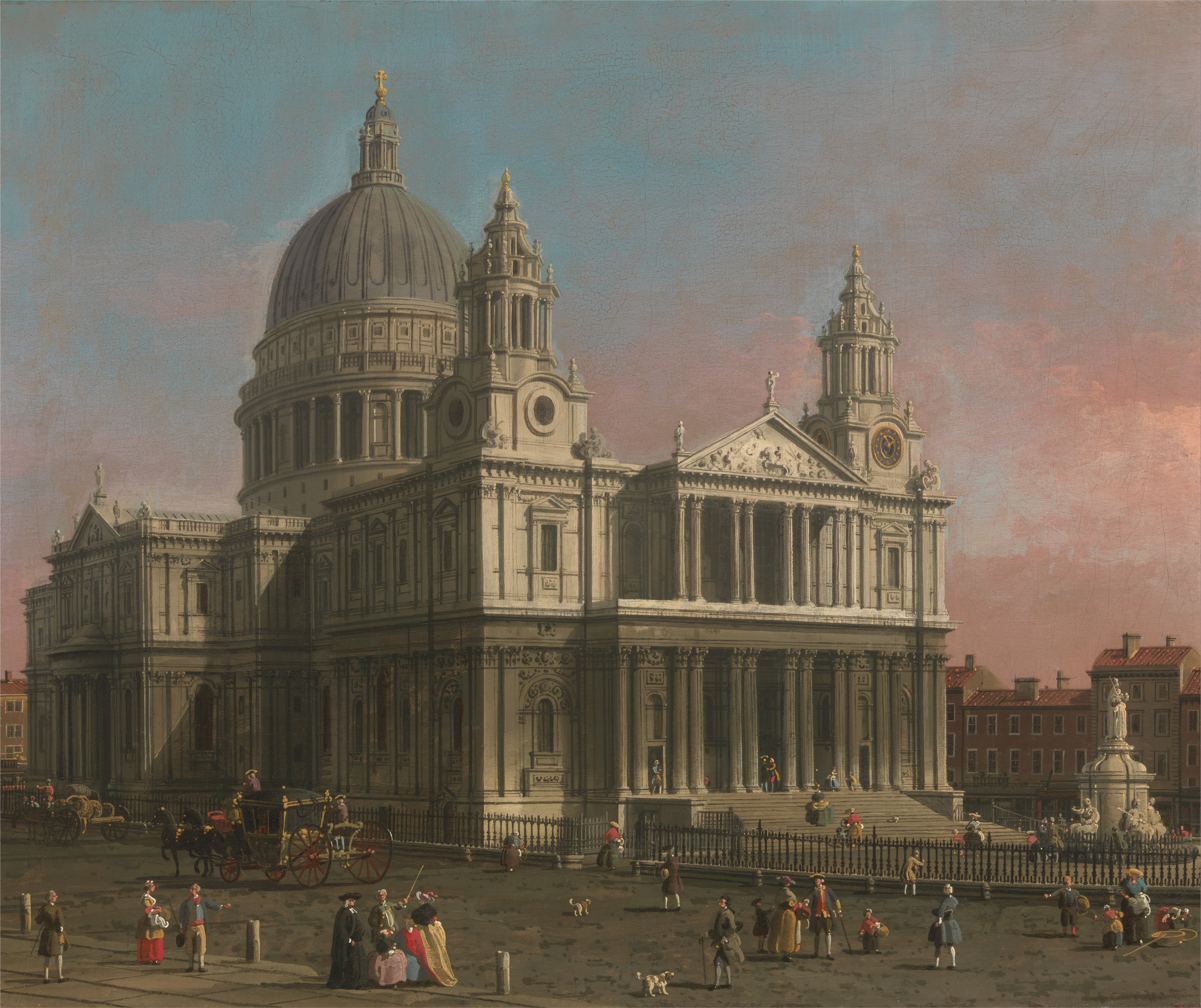
St. Paul's Cathedral, 1754

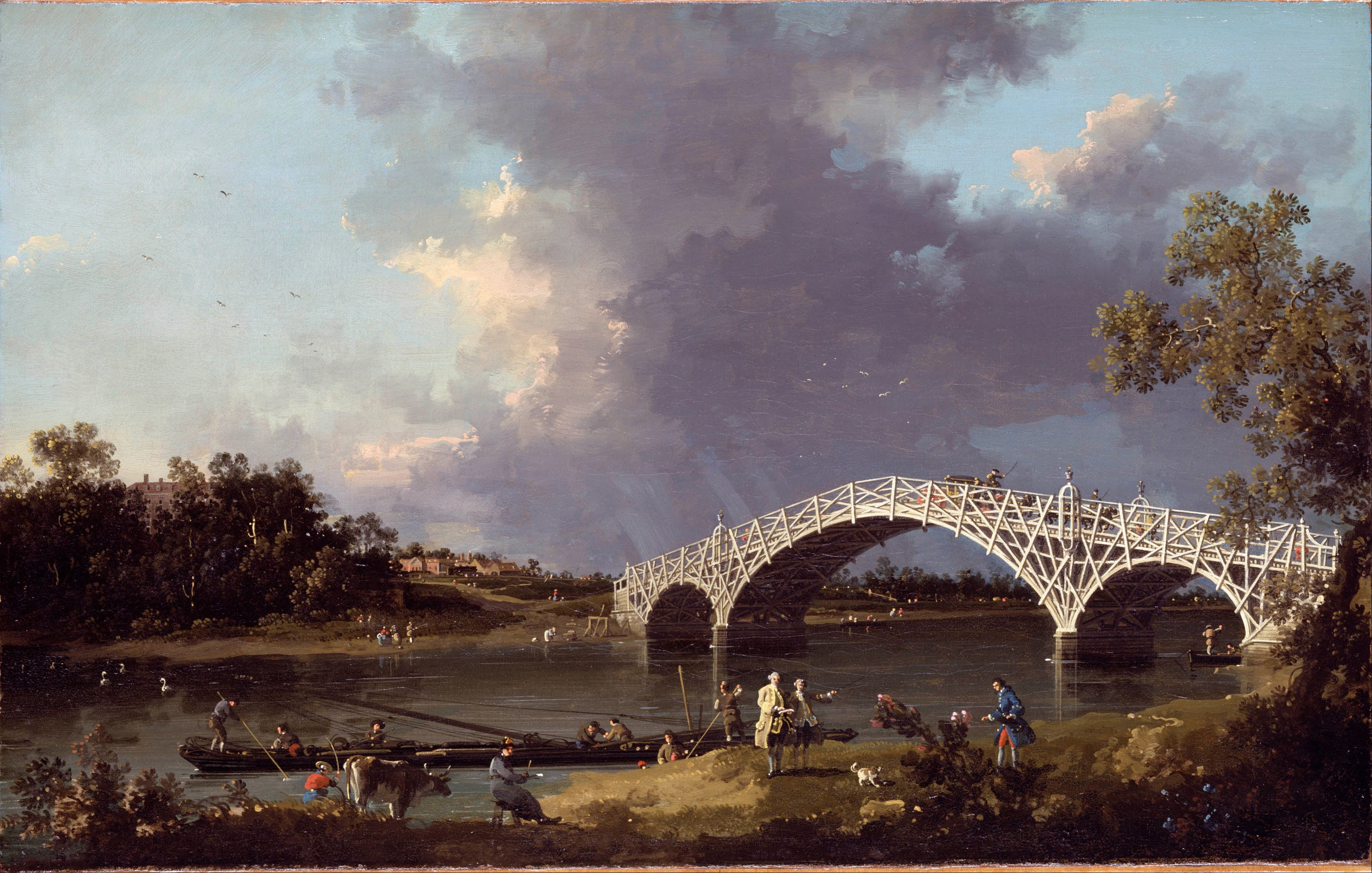
A View of Walton Bridge, 1754

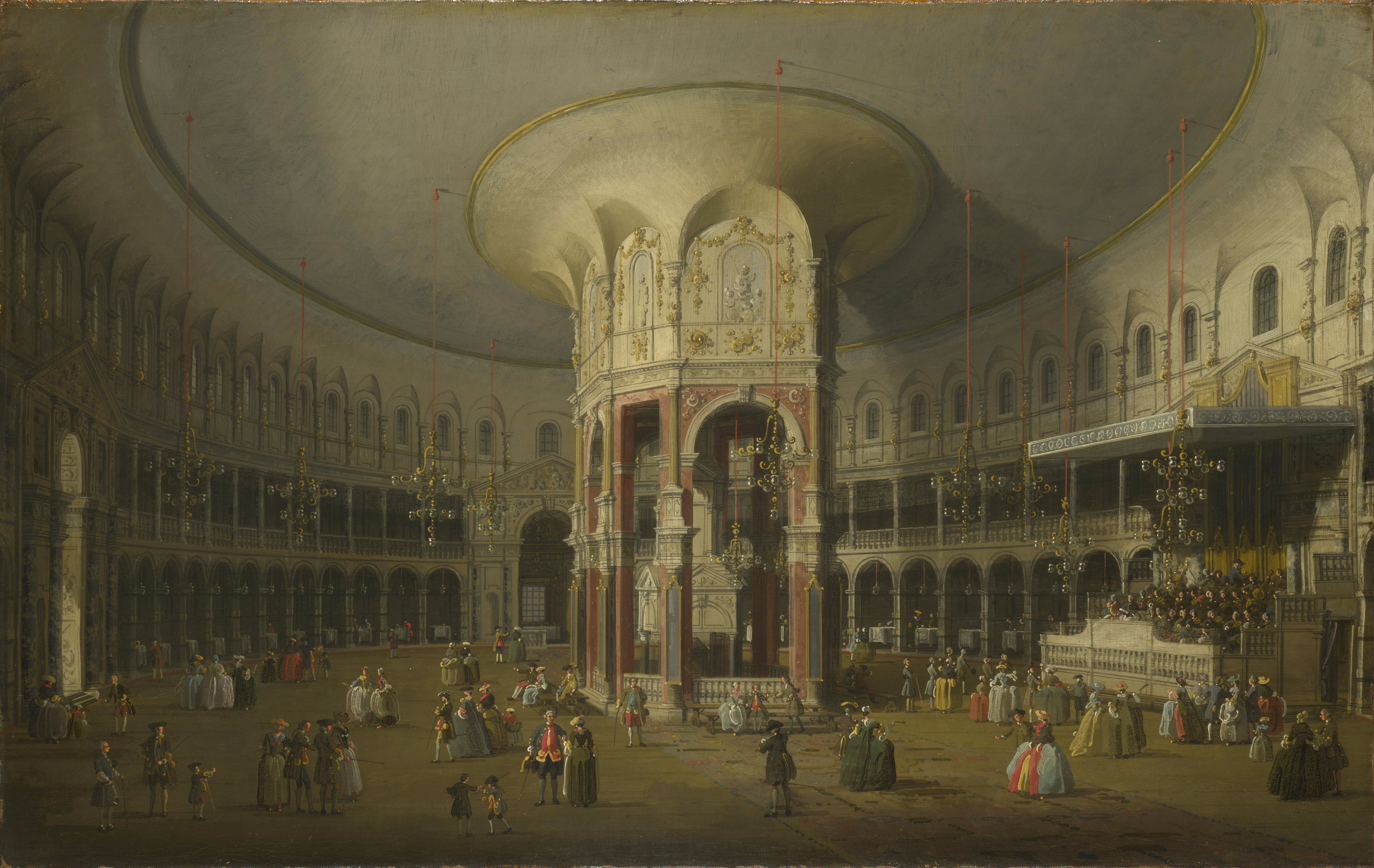
Interior of the Rotunda at Ranelagh, 1754

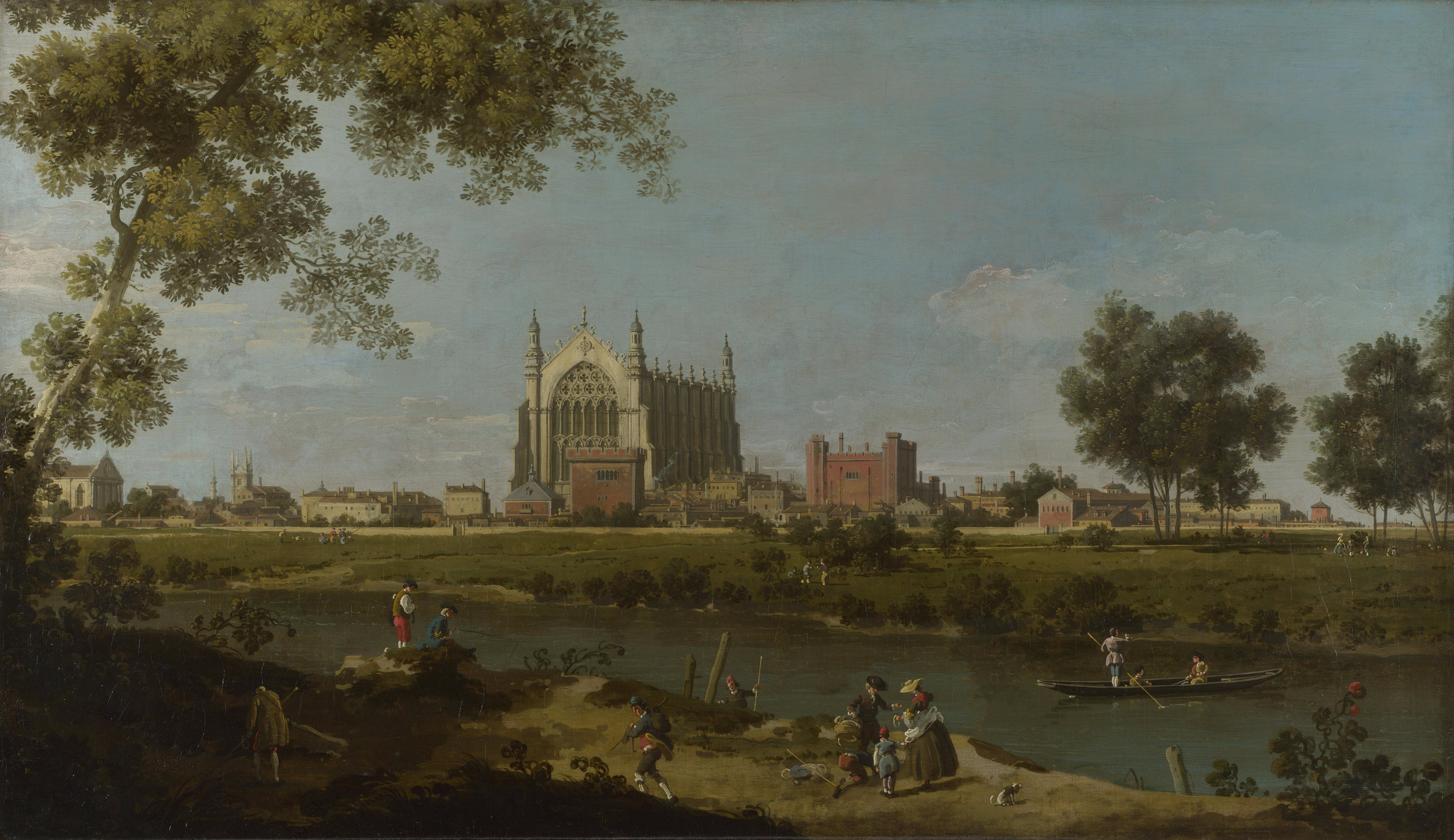
Eton College, 1754

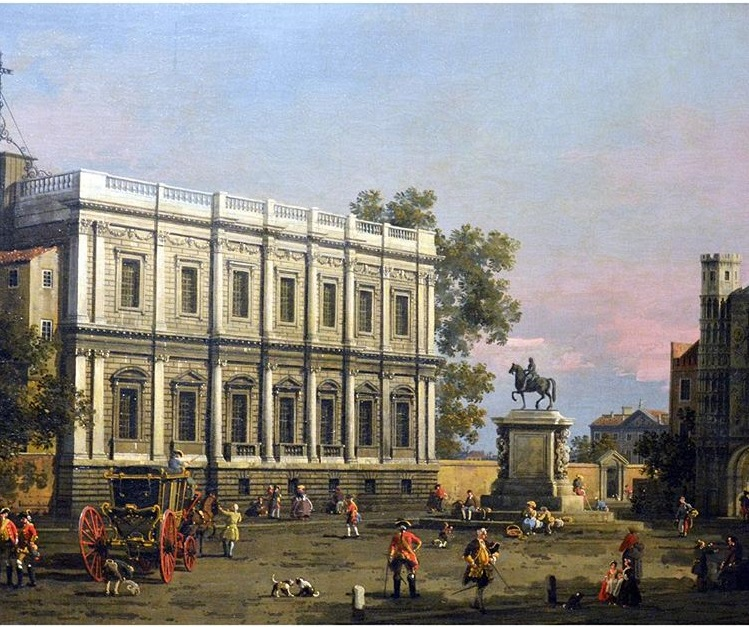
Banqueting House, 1754

== See also ==
- List of works by Canaletto
- Bernardo Bellotto, also known as "Canaletto" in Germany and Poland, was Canaletto's nephew and pupil
