= Bernardo Canal =

Italian painter (1644 –1744)

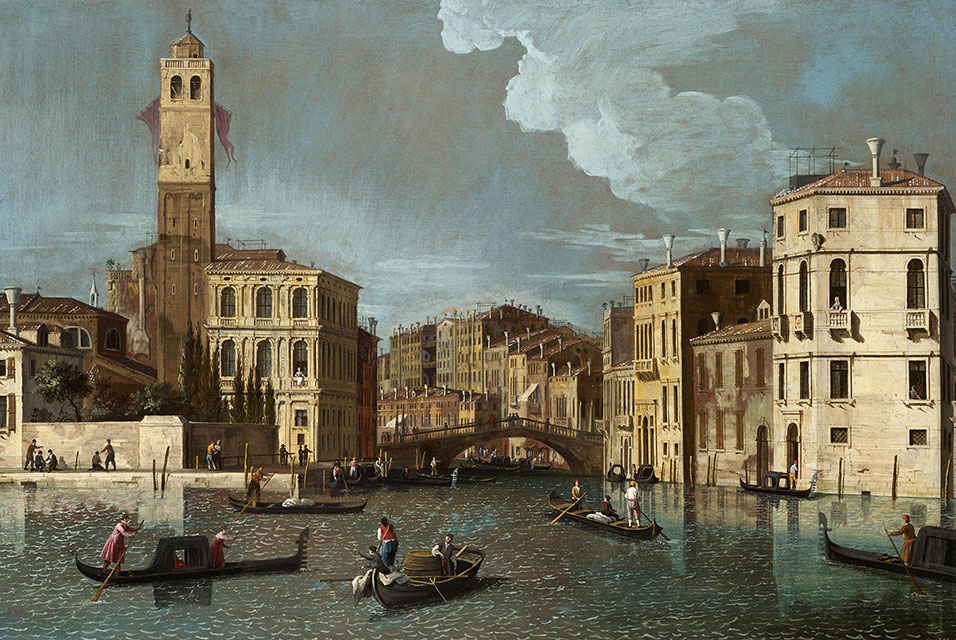
The Grand Canal at Cannaregio

Bernardo Canal (1664, Venice – 1744, Venice) was an Italian painter; father of the famous painter, Giovanni Antonio Canal, known as Canaletto. Although he earned his living as a theatrical scene painter, he is best known for his vedute; created under the direct inspiration of his contemporary, Luca Carlevarijs.

== Biography ==
In 1695, he married Artemisia Barbieri (c.1670-?), about whom little is known. In 1717, he made his first appearance on the list of members of the Venetian painters' guild and was recognized therein as a member of the College of Painters. That organization awarded him the title of "Prior" in 1739.

During his life, he was best known as a painter of theatrical sets for works by Antonio Vivaldi, Fortunato Chelleri, Carlo Francesco Pollarolo and Giuseppe Maria Orlandini at the Teatro San Angelo and the Teatro San Cassiano. Later, he turned to painting urban scenes of Venice and, together with his son, helped popularize vedute.

Both of their styles are characterized by a meticulous attention to architectural detail and lighting effects.
