= Capriccio with Palladian buildings =

Painting by Canaletto

- Artist: Canaletto
- Year: c. 1756 - 1759
- Type: Oil painting
- Dimensions: 52 cm × 82 cm (20 in × 32 in)
- Location: Galleria nazionale di Parma

The Capriccio with Palladian buildings (Italian: Capriccio con edifici palladiani) is an oil painting on canvas (58x82 cm) by Canaletto, dating from about 1756 to 1759 and stored in the Galleria Nazionale Di Parma.

== Picture content and symbolism ==
The painting shows a fictitious scene with buildings by the Italian architect Andrea Palladio. The Palazzo Chiericati in Vicenza can be seen at the left edge of the picture, the building on the right is the Basilica Palladiana in Vicenza. The bridge is Palladio's project for the Rialto Bridge in Venice, which, however, was not executed.

== Sources ==
- Fornari Schianchi, Lucia (2000). Galleria Nazionale di Parma, Catalogo delle opere. Milan: Franco Maria Ricci.
- Beltrami, Guido; Burns, Howard (2008). Palladio. London: Royal Academy of Arts.
