= Local color (visual art) =

In painting, local color is the color of an object when seen under flat white light with no adjustment for form shadow or colors of light or secondary light sources. An example would be the assumption that an apple is "red" when it is actually dependent on the color of the light hitting it, the color of objects around it, glossiness, and variations within the colors on the surface of the apple itself. Local color is learned in childhood to help simplify and make sense of the world. "The sky is blue", "grass is green", etc. when there are actually myriad variations in hue, chroma, within these areas. In order to represent objects realistically, painters must look beyond the simplifications of local color. Demonstrations of color constancy show how flawed local color assumptions can be when the light source has a color shift.

In contemporary sculpture local color is the original color of the raw material that remains unpainted in the completed work.
