= 1752 in art =

Events from the year 1752 in art.

== Events ==
- 1 March – Scottish painter Allan Ramsay elopes with and marries, as his second wife, the Jacobite heiress Margaret Lindsay.
- A fire at Kremsier (modern-day Kroměříž in Moravia) destroys the originals of three 16th-century paintings made by Hans Holbein the Younger in England: Sir Thomas More and his family, The Triumph of Wealth and The Triumph of Poverty.

== Works ==
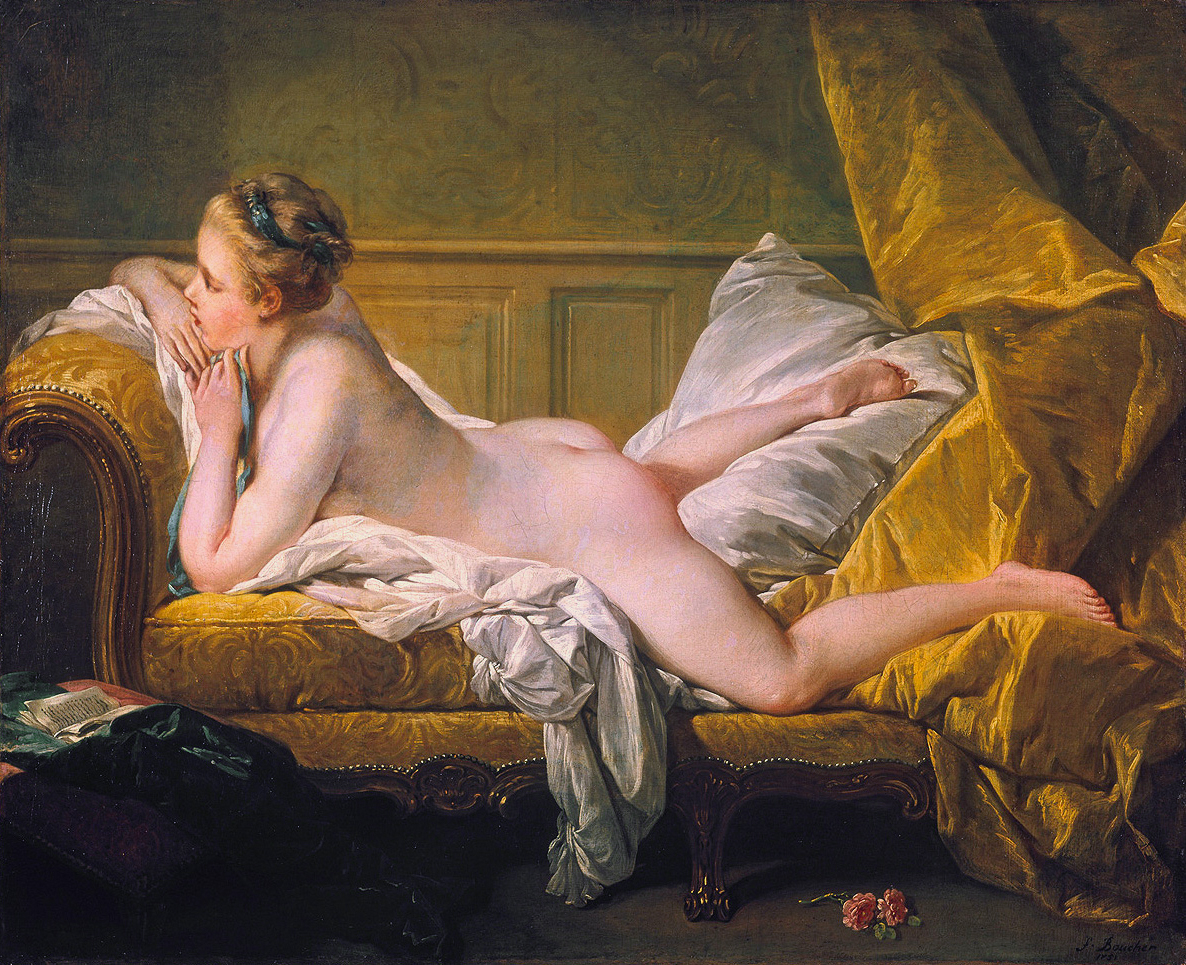
François Boucher, Marie-Louise O'Murphy

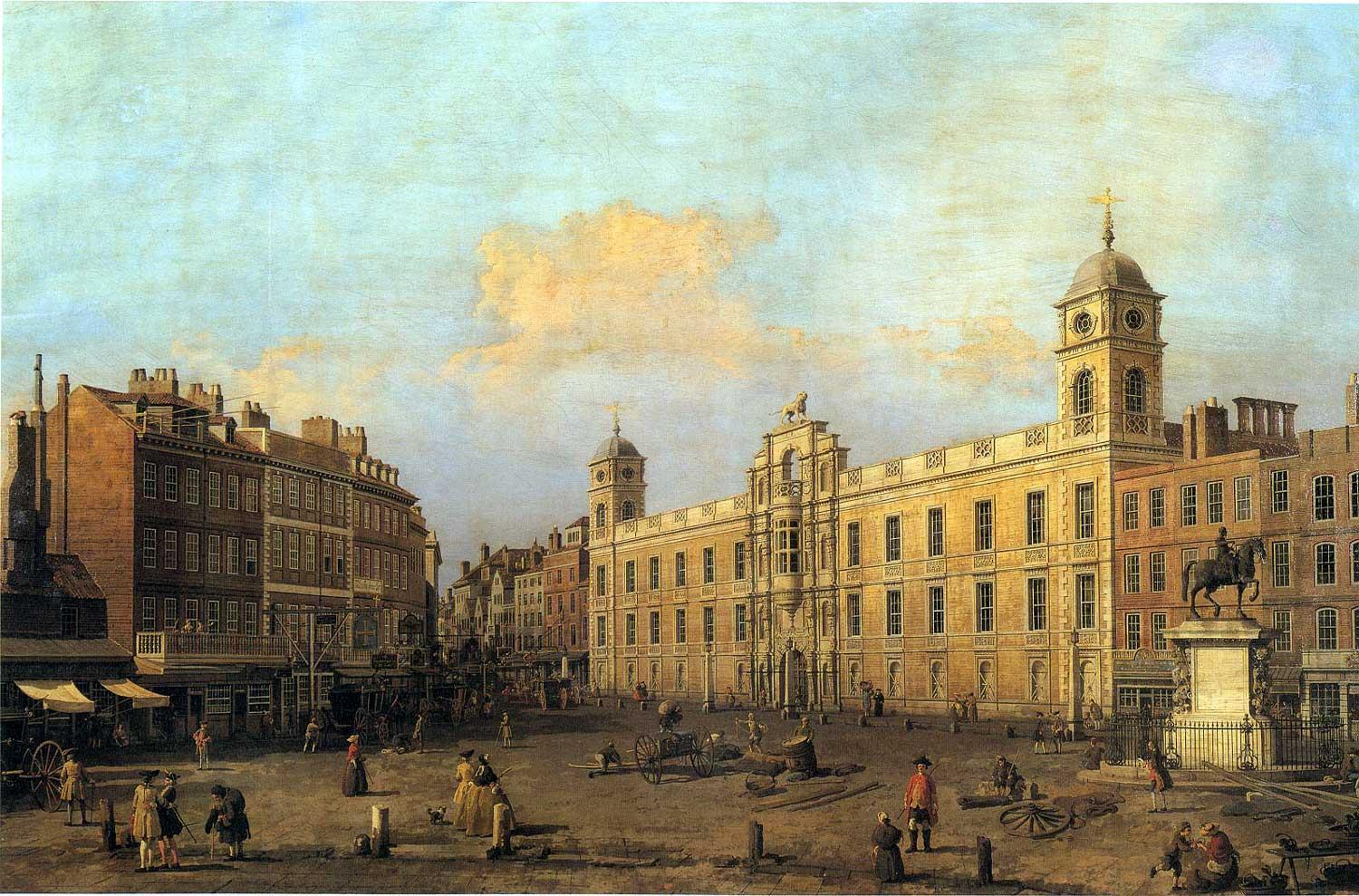
Northumberland House by Canaletto

- François Boucher
  - Allegory of Music
  - Marie-Louise O'Murphy (approximate date)
  - A Reclining Nymph Playing The Flute With Putti, Perhaps The Muse Euterpe
- Canaletto
  - Northumberland House
  - Warwick Castle, East Front from the Courtyard
- Jean-Honoré Fragonard – Jeroboam Sacrificing to Idols
- Jean-Marc Nattier – Baronne Rigoley d'Ogny as Aurora
- Louis-François Roubiliac – Monument to John Montagu, 2nd Duke of Montagu (marble, Warkton church, Northamptonshire, England)
- Gaspare Traversi
  - Murder during Meal at the House of Absalom (Absalom murders Amnon) (Basilica of Saint Paul Outside the Walls, Rome)
  - The Wound (Gallerie dell'Accademia, Venice)

== Births ==
- January 1 – Betsy Ross, American flag designer and seamstress (died 1836)
- January 18 – Josiah Boydell, British publisher and painter (died 1817)
- February 5 – Jean Grandjean, Dutch painter, draftsman and watercolourist (died 1781)
- April 4 – Jean-Pierre Saint-Ours, Swiss painter (died 1809)
- April 21 – Humphry Repton, English garden designer and artist (died 1818)
- August 21 – Antonio Cavallucci, Italian painter (died 1795)
- September – George Keith Ralph, British portrait painter (died 1811)
- September 28 – John the Painter, born James Aitken, painter turned terrorist in British naval dockyards in 1776–77 (hanged 1777)
- date unknown
  - John Robert Cozens, English draftsman and painter of romantic watercolor landscapes (died 1797)
  - George Farington, English artist (died 1788)
  - Rosalie Filleul, French painter (died 1794)
  - Jean-Baptiste Giraud, French sculptor (died 1830)
  - Luke Havell, English engraver, etcher and painter (died 1810)
  - Torii Kiyonaga, Japanese ukiyo-e printmaker and painter of the Torii school (died 1815)
  - 1752/1753: William Baillie, British artist working in India (died 1799)
  - 1752/1754: Abraham Abramson, Prussian coiner and medallist (died 1811)

== Deaths ==
- January 11 – Johann Jakob Frey the Elder, Swiss engraver (born 1681)
- January 26 – Jean-François de Troy, French painter (born 1679)
- April 6 – Friedrich Christian Glume, German sculptor (born 1714)
- March 21 – Gio Nicola Buhagiar, Maltese painter (born 1698)
- May 4 – Pieter Snyers, Flemish art collector, painter, draughtsman and engraver (born 1681)
- May 24 – Charles Parrocel, French painter and engraver and a specialist in battle and hunting scenes (born 1688)
- June 15 – Charles-Antoine Coypel, French painter, art commentator and playwright (born 1694)
- June 29 – Antonio Corradini, Venetian Rococo sculptor (born 1688)
- June 30 – James Seymour, English painter of equestrian subjects (born 1702)
- October 20 (bur.) – William Verelst, English painter of portraits, still lifes and birds (born 1704)
- date unknown
  - Jacopo Amigoni, Italian painter known for mythological figures and religious artifacts, best known for his initial work in Venice (born 1682)
  - Bian Shoumin, Chinese painter in Qing Dynasty (born 1684)
- probable - Robert Feke, American painter (born ca. 1705)
