= Giraud =

Giraud is a surname. It is a variant of the Proto-Germanic name Gerard, meaning spear-strong.

== Notable people with this surname ==
- Alain Giraud (born 1959), French chef
- Albert Giraud (1860–1929), Belgian poet
- Alexis Giraud-Teulon (1839–1916), French academic, lawyer and translator
- Brigitte Giraud (born 1960), French writer
- Charles Giraud (1802–81), French lawyer and politician
- Claude Giraud (1936-2020), French actor
- Dwight Giraud, Barbadian-Canadian drag performer
- Georges Giraud (1889–1943), French mathematician
- Giovanni Giraud (1776–1834), Italian dramatist
- Henri Giraud (1879–1949), French general during World Wars I and II
- Hervé Giraud (born 1957), French Catholic prelate
- Hubert Giraud (composer) (1920–2016), French composer and lyricist
- Jean Giraud (1938–2012), French comics artist
- Jean Giraud (mathematician) (1936–2007), French mathematician
- Jean-Baptiste Giraud (1752–1830), French sculptor
- Joyce Giraud (born 1975), Puerto Rican actress, beauty pageant winner
- Matt Giraud (born 1985), American singer, musician and TV personality
- Nicolas Giraud (born 1978), French actor
- Nicolo Giraud (c. 1795 – ?), Greek companion of the poet Lord Byron
- René Girard (1904–1968), French scientist-historian
- Robert Giraud (1921–1997), French poet and journalist
- Théophile de Giraud (born 1968), Belgian writer, philosopher and activist
- Yvette Giraud (1916–2014), French singer

== See also ==
- Girod
- Girard (disambiguation)
- Guiraud
- Girault
