= Girard =

Girard may refer to:

== Places in the United States ==
- Girard, Alabama
- Girard, Georgia
- Girard, Illinois
- Girard, Kansas
- Girard, Michigan
- Girard, Minnesota
- Girard, Ohio
- Girard, Pennsylvania
- Girard, Texas
- Girard, West Virginia
- Girard Township, Macoupin County, Illinois
- Girard Township, Michigan
- Girard Township, Minnesota
- Girard Township, Erie County, Pennsylvania
- Girard Township, Clearfield County, Pennsylvania
- Girard Avenue, a street in Philadelphia, Pennsylvania, served by two SEPTA stations:
  - SEPTA Route 15, a trolley line also known as the Girard Avenue Line
- Woodland Hills, Los Angeles, California, was known as Girard until 1941

== People ==
- Girard (surname)
- Girard I of Roussillon (died 1113), count of Roussillon
- Girard II of Roussillon (died 1172), count of Roussillon
- Gerard la Pucelle (1117–1184), Anglo-French scholar of canon law, clerk, and Bishop of Coventry
- Girard of Buonalbergo, Norman chieftain in the middle of the eleventh century in the Mezzogiorno
- Girard Cavalaz (1225–1247), Italian troubadour from Lombardy
- Girard Desargues (1591–1661), French mathematician and engineer, considered one of the founders of projective geometry
- Girard "Gerry" McDonald (born 1958), American ice hockey player

== Other uses ==
- Girard (grape), red wine grape that is also known as Carignan
- Girard-Perregaux, Swiss manufacturer of complex timepieces
- Girard College, private philanthropic boarding school in Philadelphia, Pennsylvania
- Girard Estate, Philadelphia, Pennsylvania

== See also ==
- Girard station (disambiguation)
- Giraud
- Gerard
- Girardin (disambiguation)
- Girardot (disambiguation)
- Girardville (disambiguation)
