= Jean-Baptiste Girard =

Jean-Baptiste Girard may refer to:

- Jean-Baptiste Girard (pedagogue) (1765–1850), Swiss Franciscan educator
- Jean-Baptiste Girard (soldier) (1775–1815), French soldier of the Napoleonic Wars
- Jean-Baptiste Girard (priest) (1680–1733), a priest tried for witchcraft, abuse and corruption of Catherine Cadière

== See also ==
- Jean-Baptiste
- Girard (surname)
- Jean-Baptiste Giraud, French sculptor
