= Girard (surname) =

Girard is a French surname. Notable people with the surname include:

- Aimé Girard (1830–1898), French chemist
- Albert Girard (1595–1632), French-born mathematician (based on Netherlands)
- Alexander Girard (1907–1993), American textile designer and folk art collector
- Charles Frédéric Girard (1822–1895), French biologist
- Chuck Girard (1943–2025), American musician
- Claire Girard, background character in Code Lyoko
- Dale Girard, American politician
- Édith Girard (1949–2014), French architect and academic
- Fawn Girard (born 1978), American archer
- Fina Girard (born 2001), Swiss politician and youth climate activist
- Geoffrey Girard, American author
- Georges Girard, French bacteriologist
- Gertrude Girard-Montet (1913–1989), Swiss politician and suffragist
- Grégoire Girard (1925–2025), Canadian surveyor and politician
- Hugo Girard, Canadian Strongman, former World Champion
- Jean-Baptiste Girard (disambiguation), several people
- Jean-Yves Girard (born 1947), French mathematician and logician
- Jonathan Girard (born 1980), Canadian ice hockey player
- Joe Girard, Guinness Book of World Records winning American salesman
- Joseph Girard (disambiguation), several people
- Louis Dominique Girard (1815–1871), French hydraulic engineer
- Maurice Jean Auguste Girard (1822–1886), French entomologist
- Nicolas Girard (born 1972), Quebec politician
- Nicolas Girard (archer) (born 2000), French archer
- Nicole Girard-Mangin (1878-1919), in World War I became first woman medical doctor to serve in the French Army
- Patrick Girard, French engineer
- Philippe de Girard (1775–1845), French inventor
- Pierre Girard (disambiguation), several people
- Raphael Girard (1898-1982), Swiss anthropologist and writer
- Rémy Girard, Canadian actor
- René Girard (1923–2015), French philosopher
- René Girard (footballer), French footballer
- Samuel Girard (born 1998), Canadian ice hockey player
- Serge Girard (born 1953), French adventurer
- Stephen Girard, American financier and philanthropist
- Taylor Girard (born 1998), American ice hockey player
- William S. Girard, American soldier convicted of killing a Japanese civilian in 1957
