= Girardeau =

Girardeau is a French surname. Notable people with the surname include:

- Arnett Girardeau (1929–2017), American dentist and politician
- Émile Girardeau (1882–1970), French engineer
- Isabella Girardeau, opera soprano in the 1711 premiere of Rinalso
- John Girardeau (1825–1898), American Presbyterian minister and theologian
- Marvin D. Girardeau (1930–2015), quantum physicist and research professor at the University of Arizona

== See also ==
- Cape Girardeau, a city in southeast Missouri, United States
- Girardot (disambiguation)
