= Girard station =

Girard station may refer to:

- Girard station (Broad Street Line), a subway station on the B line in Philadelphia, Pennsylvania, United States
- Girard station (Market-Frankford Line), a rapid transit station on the L line in Philadelphia, Pennsylvania, United States

== See also ==
- Girard (disambiguation)
