= Northumberland House =

Former townhouse on the Strand, London

Coordinates: 51°30′27″N 0°7′36″W

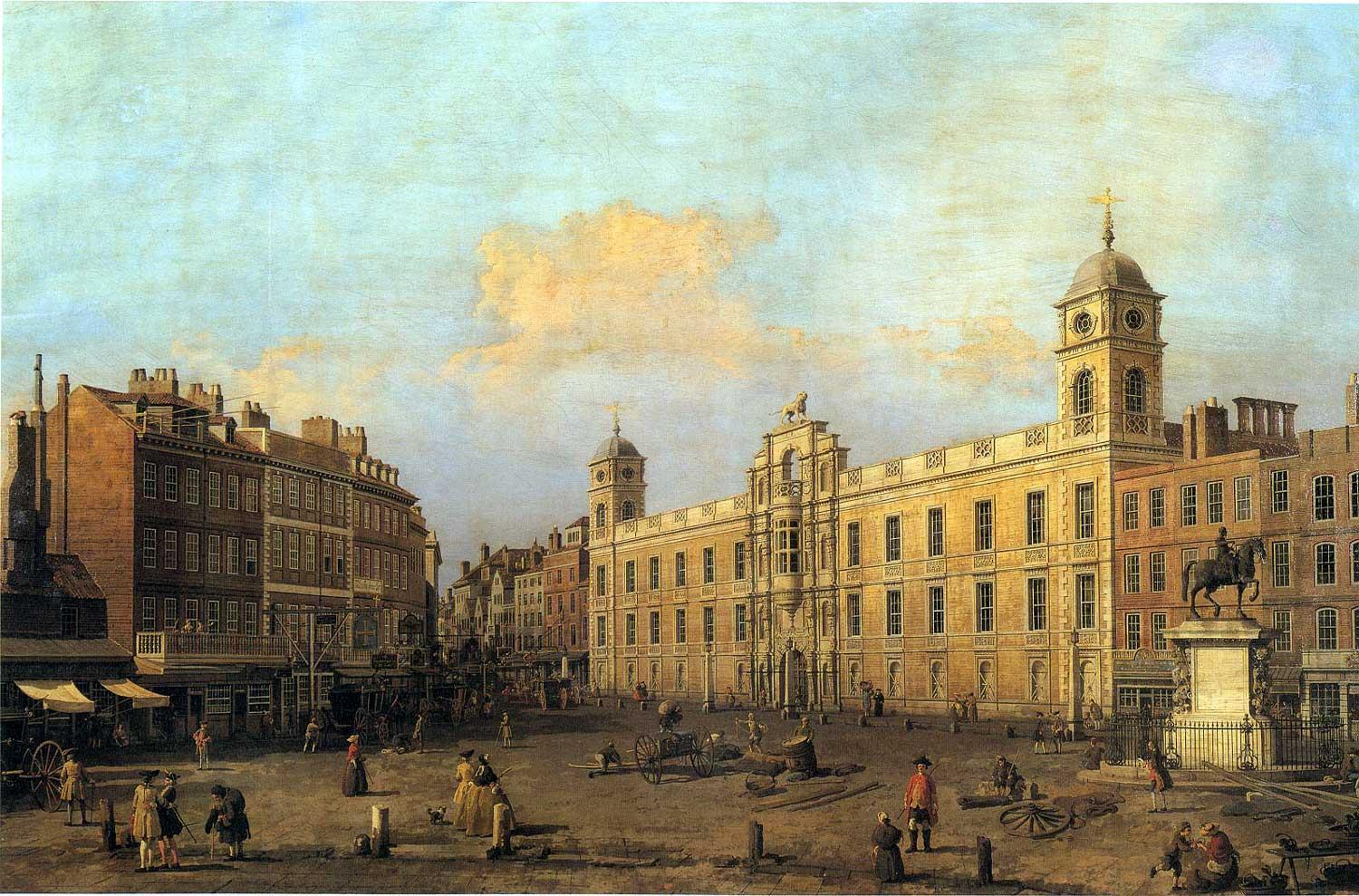
Northumberland House by Canaletto, 1752. It shows the Strand front of Northumberland House. Note the Percy Lion atop the central facade. The Statue of Charles I at right survives in situ.

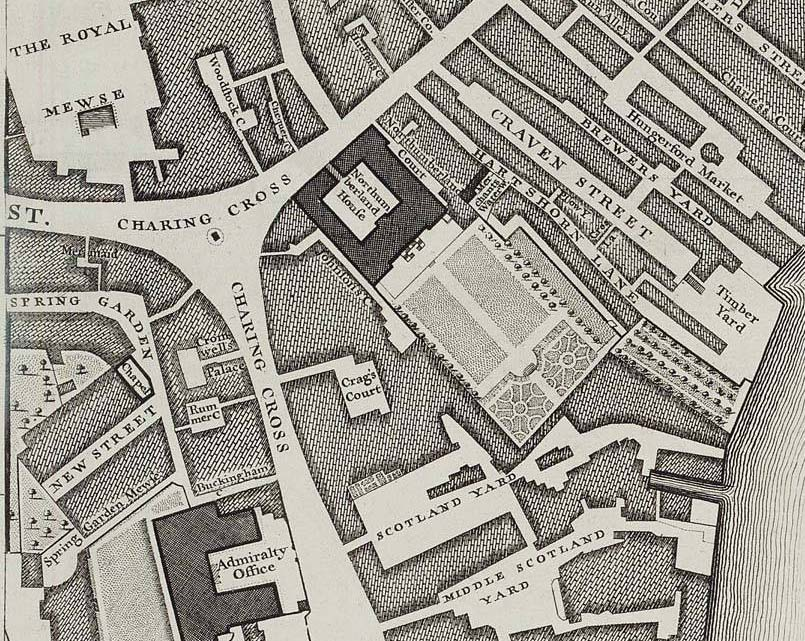
An extract from John Rocque's Map of London, 1746. The two projecting garden wings had not yet been added.

Position of Northumberland House and garden on a modern map, based on John Rocque's 1746 map.

Northumberland House (also known as Suffolk House when owned by the Earls of Suffolk) was a large Jacobean townhouse in London, so-called because it was, for most of its history, the London residence of the Percy family, who were the Earls and later Dukes of Northumberland and one of England's richest and most prominent aristocratic dynasties for many centuries. It stood at the far western end of the Strand from around 1605 until it was demolished in 1874. In its later years it overlooked Trafalgar Square.

== Background ==
In the 16th century the Strand, which connects the City of London with the royal centre of Westminster, was lined with the mansions of some of England's richest prelates and noblemen. Most of the grandest houses were on the southern side of the road and had gardens stretching down to the River Thames e.g. Durham House.

== Construction ==
In around 1605 Henry Howard, 1st Earl of Northampton cleared a site at Charing Cross on the site of a convent and built himself a mansion, at first known as Northampton House. The Strand facade was 162 feet (49 m) wide and the house's depth was marginally greater. It had a single central courtyard and turrets in each corner.

The balustrade of the Strand front carried an inscription in stone letters. During the funeral of Anne of Denmark in May 1619, a large stone letter 'S' fell from the façade onto spectators of the procession, killing one William Appleyard. According to Nathaniel Brent, the stone was part of a motto and was "thrust down by a gentlewoman who put her foot against it, not thinking it had been so brickle [brittle]".

The garden was 160 feet (49 m) wide and over 300 feet (91 m) long, but unlike those of neighbouring mansions to the east, it did not reach all the way down to the river.

== Seventeenth and eighteenth centuries ==
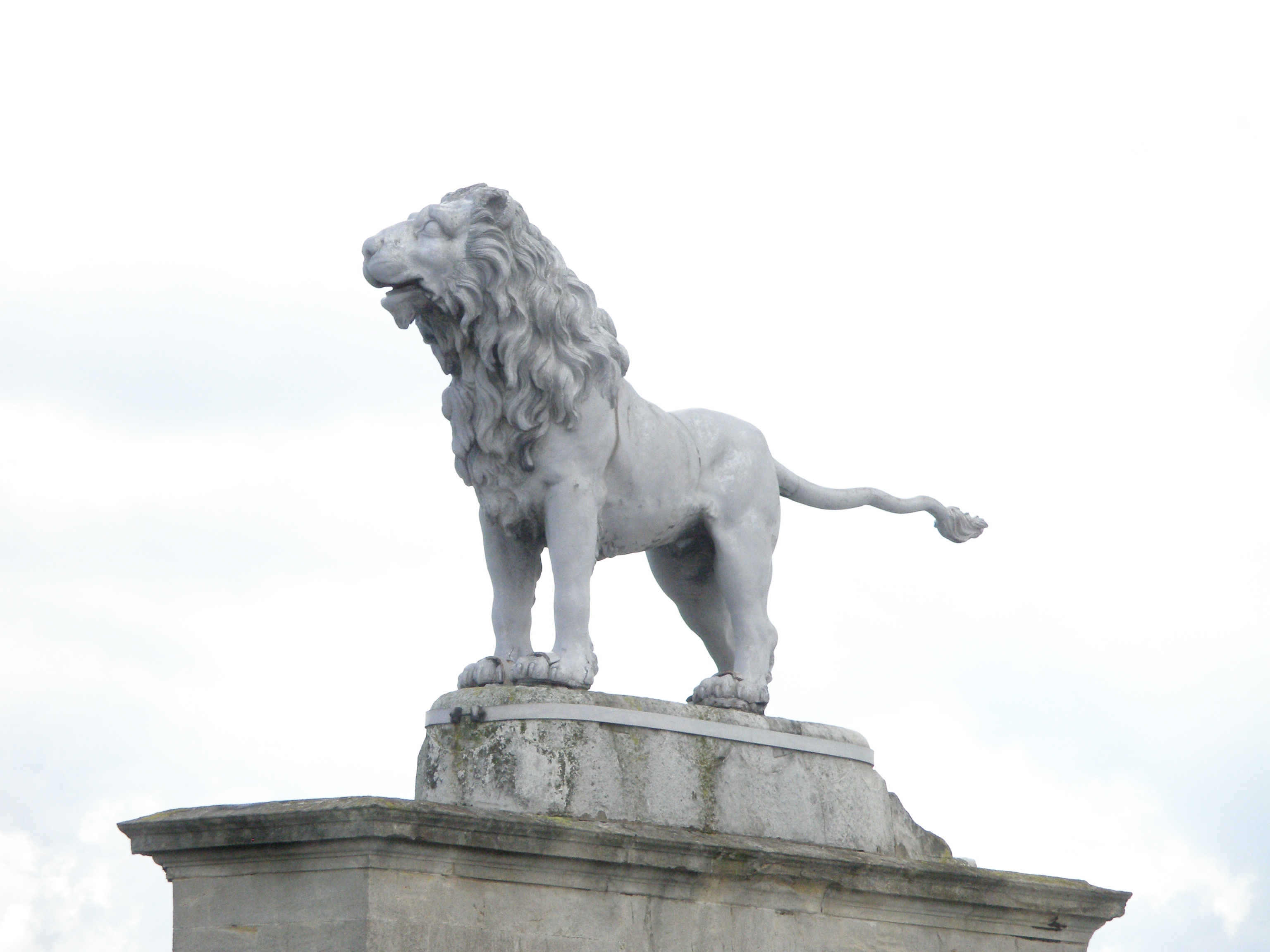
The Percy Lion (crest of Percy), after a model by Michelangelo, removed from Northumberland House in 1874, prior to demolition, by the 6th Duke and placed atop Syon House, his seat to the west of London.

In 1614 the house passed from Lord Northampton to the Earls of Suffolk, another branch of the powerful Howard family headed by the Dukes of Norfolk. Thomas Howard, 1st Earl of Suffolk inherited the house, but his wife, Catherine Howard, Countess of Suffolk, had to pay £5000 for the in situ furnishings.

In the 1640s it was sold to the Earl of Northumberland, at the discounted price of £15,000, as part of the marriage settlement when he married a Howard.

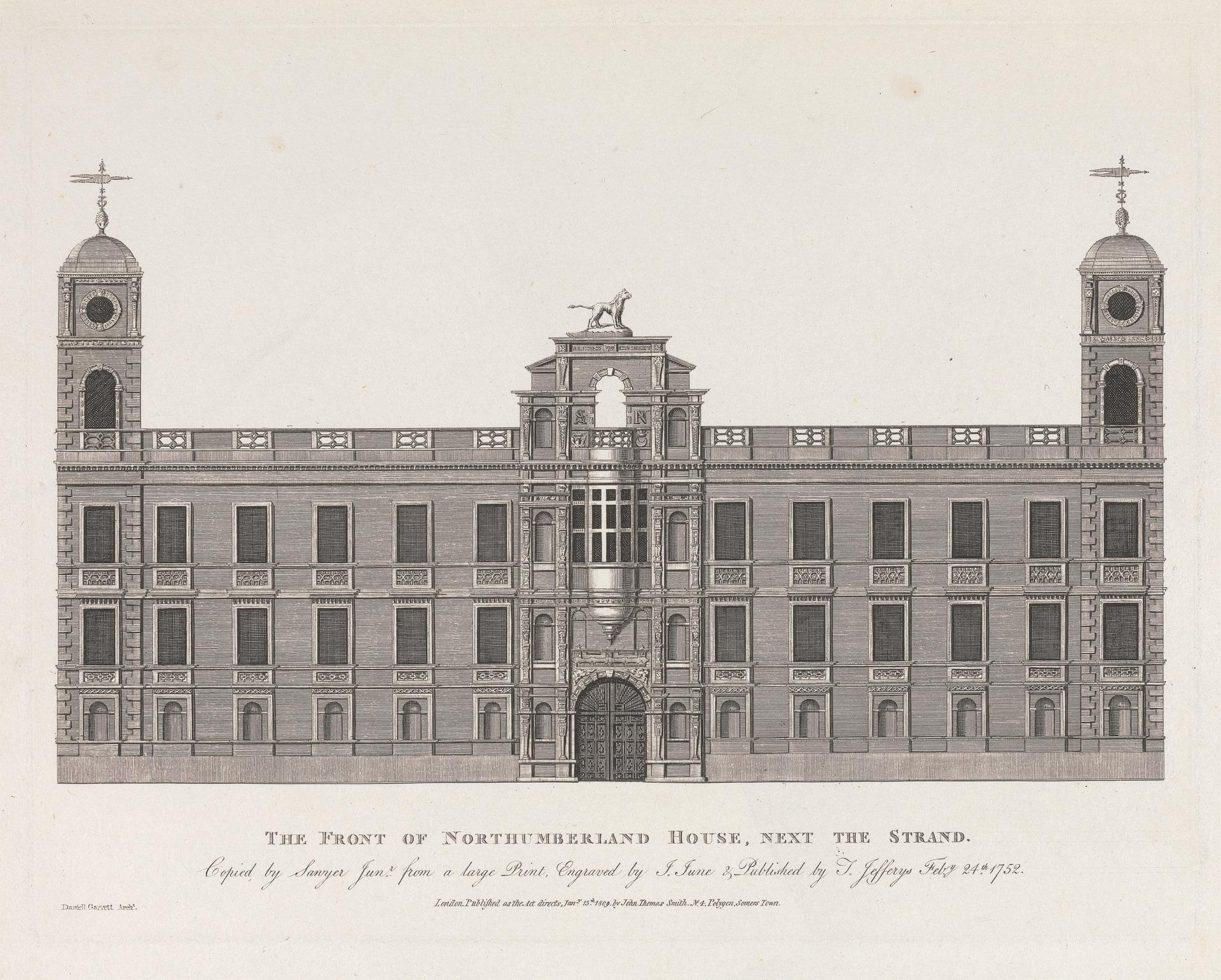
The Front of Northumberland House, next the Strand, 1809

Regular alterations were made over the next two centuries in response to fashion and to make the layout more convenient for the lifestyle of the day. John Webb was employed from 1657 to 1660 to relocate the family's living accommodation from the Strand front to the garden front. In the 1740s and 1750s the Strand front was largely reconstructed and two wings were added which projected from the ends of the garden front at right angles. These were over 100 feet (30 m) long, in late palladian style, and contained a ballroom and a picture gallery, the latter itself 106 feet (32 m) long. The architects were Daniel Garrett, until his death in 1753; and then the better known James Paine. In the mid-1760s Robert Mylne was employed to reface the courtyard in stone; he may also have been responsible for extensions to the two garden wings which were made at that time. In the 1770s Robert Adam was commissioned to redecorate the state rooms on the garden front, and the Glass Drawing Room at Northumberland House was one of his most celebrated interiors. Part of the Strand front had to be rebuilt after a fire in 1780.

== Nineteenth century ==
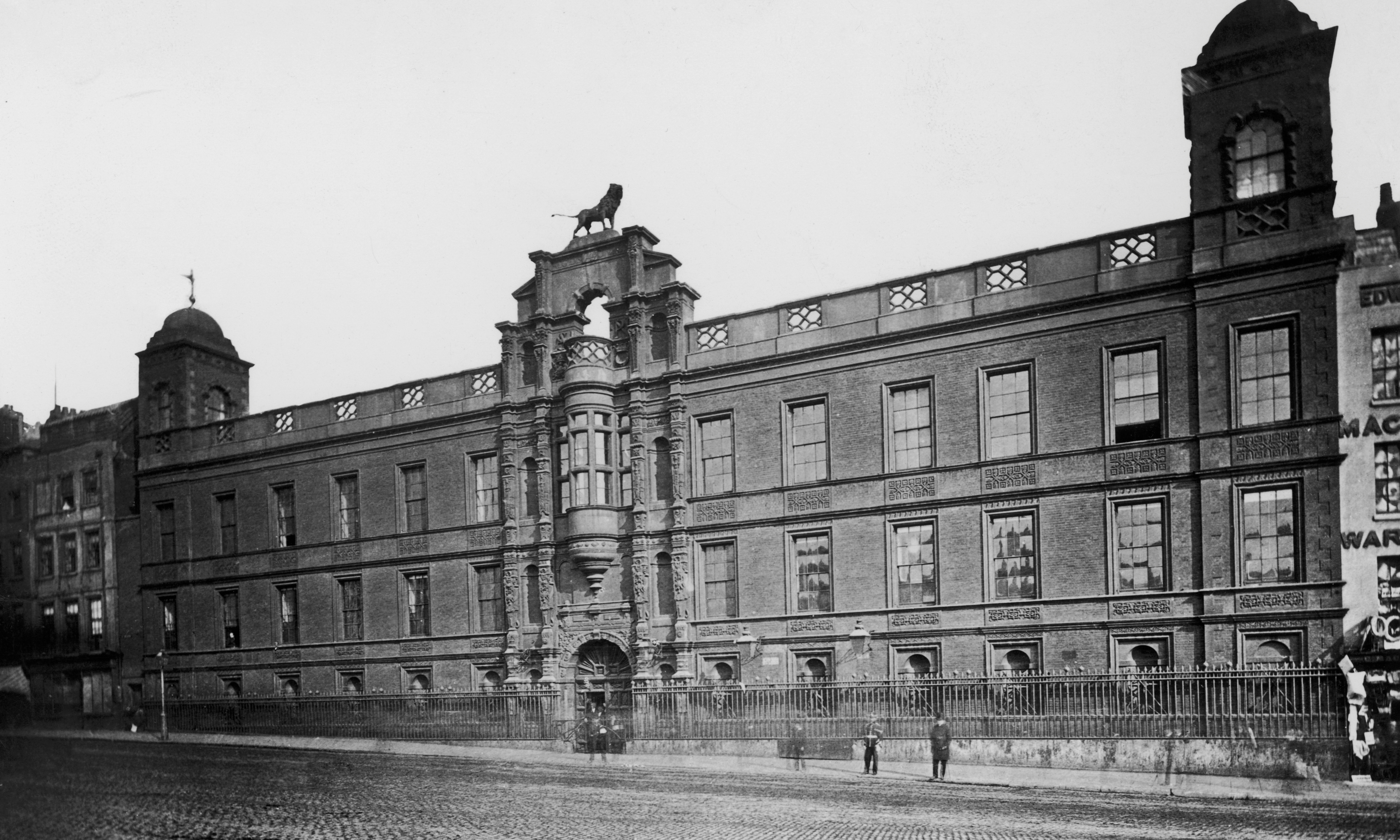
Northumberland House, shortly before it was demolished in 1874.

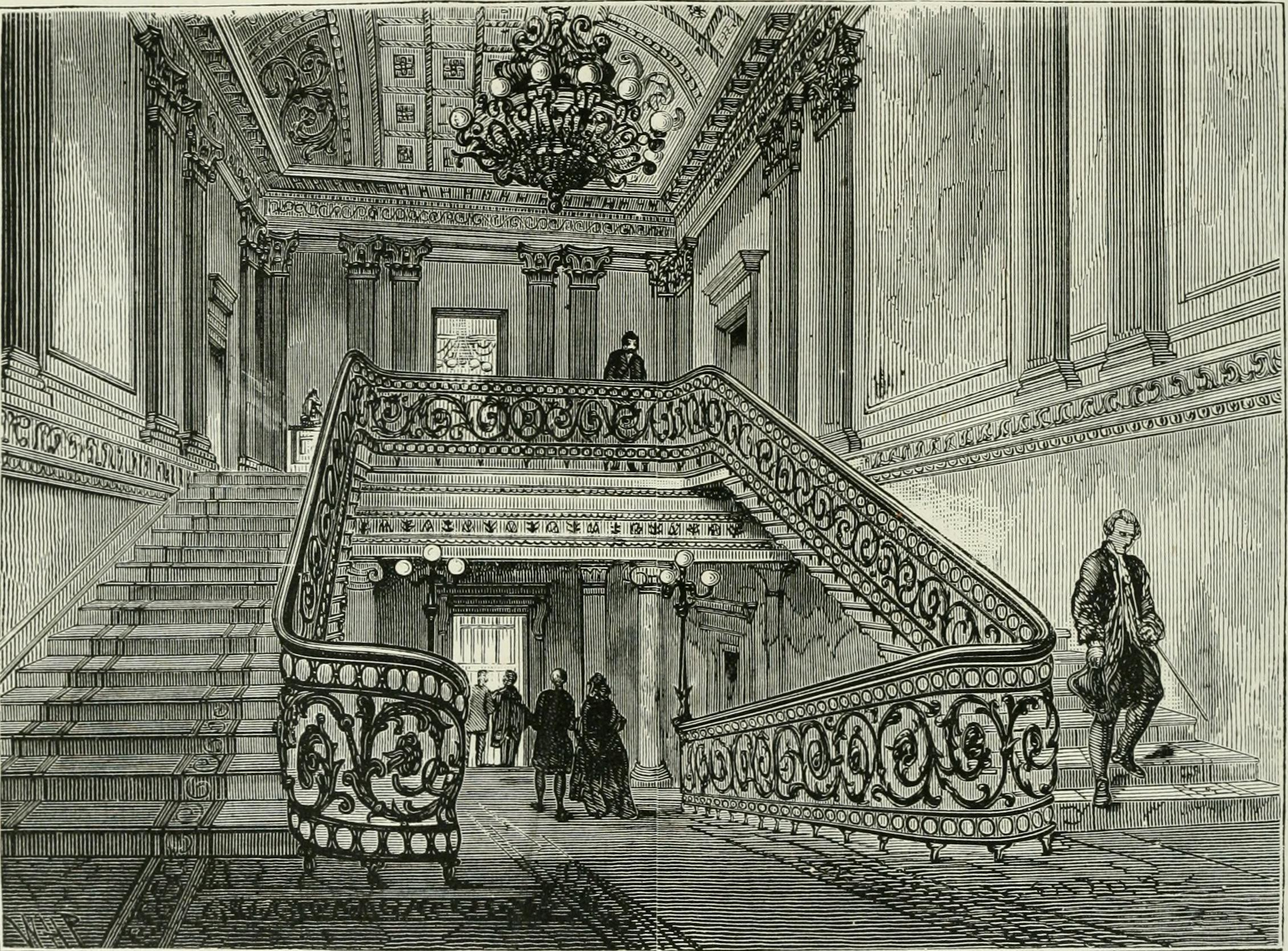
Northumberland house staircase

In 1819 Thomas Cundy was employed to rebuild the Garden (South) Front, which had become unstable, moving it 5 feet (1.5 m) south; he subsequently added the final main staircase.

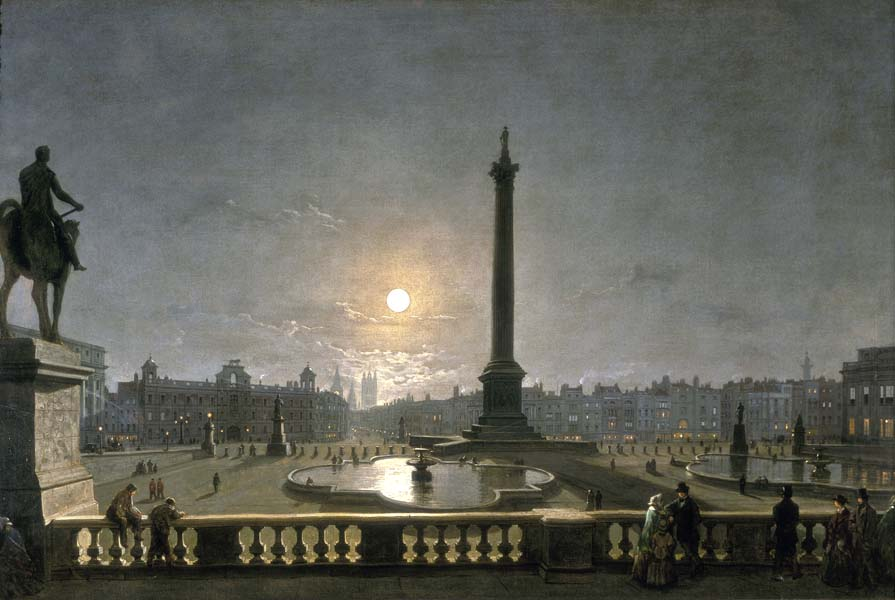
This painting, c. 1865, in which Northumberland House is centre left, puts the location of the building into its modern context. The view is southwards across Trafalgar Square, with the towers of the Houses of Parliament on the skyline.

By the end of the mid-19th century the other mansions on the Strand had been demolished. The area was largely commercial and its entertainment industry had grown, meaning it was no longer a fashionable place for aristocracy to live. The then Duke of Northumberland was reluctant to leave his generations-held home, although he was pressured to do so by the Metropolitan Board of Works, which wished to build a road through the middle of the site to connect to the new roads by the Embankment. After a fire which caused substantial damage, the Duke accepted an offer of £500,000 in 1874 (equivalent to £58,600,000 in 2023). Northumberland House was demolished and Northumberland Avenue, including its buildings fronting, was built in its place.

The Duke of Northumberland took a long lease of a new London residence at No. 2 Grosvenor Place in 1873; this remained as the family's London home until 1917, when the freehold of No. 17 Prince's Gate was purchased. This house, which overlooked Hyde Park, was sold in 1939 and repurposed as the Embassy of Ethiopia in London.

== Northumberland Avenue ==
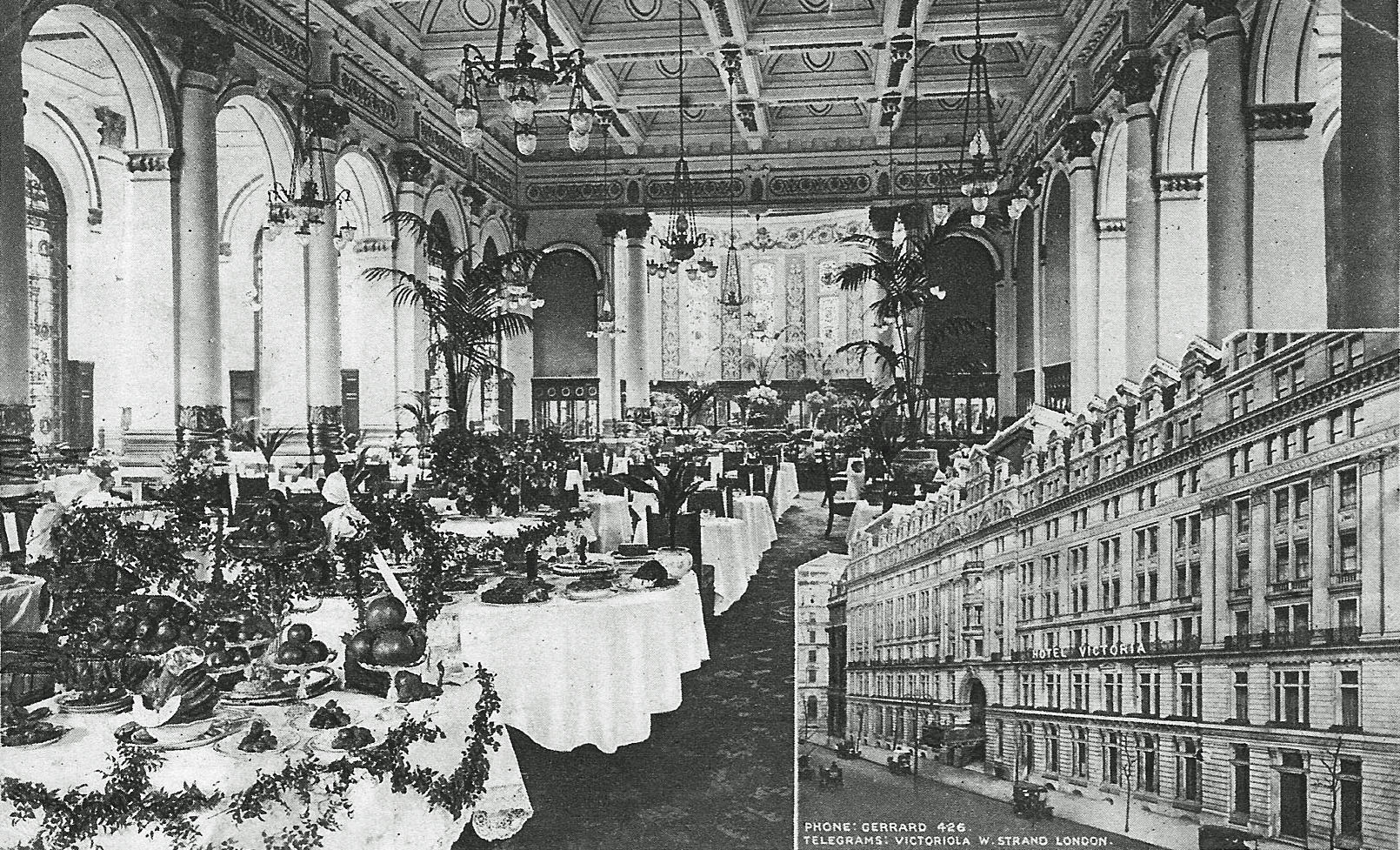
The Hotel Victoria

One of the largest buildings on the newly built Northumberland Avenue was the 500-bedroom Hotel Victoria, which in its arched entrance, and oriel window above it, imitated Northumberland House. During the Second World War it was taken over by the Ministry of Defence and renamed Northumberland House. It is now known as No. 8 Northumberland Avenue.

== Remains ==
An archway from Northumberland House, designed by William Kent, was sold for the entrance to the garden of Tudor House, which formerly stood in Bromley-by-Bow. It was moved in 1998 to form the principal entrance to the Bromley by Bow Centre. A section of the panelling from the 1770s glass drawing room survives in the collection of the Victoria and Albert Museum.

== See also ==
- Alnwick Castle – the Percy family's main seat.
- List of demolished buildings and structures in London
- Syon House – the Percy family's west London residence.

== Notes, references and sources ==
Notes and references

Sources

- London's Mansions David Pearce (BT Batsford Ltd., 1986) ISBN 0-7134-8702-X
