= Girardot =

Girardot may refer to:

== Places ==
- Girardot, Cundinamarca, a municipality in Cundinamarca, Colombia
- Girardot Municipality, Aragua, Venezuela
- Girardot Municipality, Cojedes, Venezuela

== Other uses ==
- Girardot (surname)
- Girardot Argezas, a character from Namco's Soul series

== See also ==
- Girardeau, a French surname
