= Alain Giraud =

- Born: 1959 (age 65–66); Paris, France
- Culinary career
- Cooking style: French cuisine
- Current restaurants: Hôtel de Crillon; Citrus; Bastide; Anisette Brasserie
- Television show: After Hours with Daniel

Alain Giraud is a French chef born in 1959 in Paris.

In his early years he worked at such establishments as Hôtel de Crillon.

In 1988, Giraud travelled to Los Angeles to work with chef Michel Richard at the restaurant Citrus.

Giraud later opened the restaurant Bastide which in 2002 earned a four star review from the Los Angeles Times.

In 2003, Bon Appétit magazine declared him Chef of the Year.

In 2008, Giraud opened Anisette Brasserie, a French brasserie themed restaurant in Santa Monica, California. Anisette Brasserie later closed in 2010.
