= Girod =

Girod may refer to:

== Geography ==
- Girod, Germany
- Saint-Girod, French commune in Savoie
- Girod Street Cemetery, New Orleans
- Girodpuri, a village in Chhattisgarh, India; formerly known as Girod

== People ==
- Alix Girod de l'Ain (born 1965), French journalist; see De l'autre côté du lit
- Amédée Girod de l'Ain (1781–1847) French politician
- Bastien Girod (born 1980), Swiss politician
- Bertrand Girod de l'Ain (1924–2023), French journalist
- Francis Girod (1944–2006), French film director
- Fred Girod (born 1951), Republican politician from Oregon
- Géraldine Girod (1970-), French curler
- Jean-François-Xavier Girod, (1735–1783), French doctor
- Jean-Louis Girod de l'Ain (1753–1839), French politician; see List of presidents of the National Assembly of France § Presidents of the Legislative Corps (1800–1814)
- Justin Girod-Chantrans (1750–1841), French army officer, naturalist and politician
- Louis Girod de Montfalcon (1813–1880), Savoy politician
- Lucas Chevalier-Girod (born 1977), French ski jumper in the 1996–97 FIS Ski Flying World Cup
- Marie-Catherine Girod (born 1949), French pianist
- Marie-Claire Girod (1957–2023), stage name Buzy, French singer
- Marie-Louise Girod (1915–2014), French organist
- Nicholas Girod (1747–1840), mayor of New Orleans
- Paul Girod (1931–2021), French politician
- Paul Girod (industrialist) (1881–1951), industrial, founder of Ugine steelworks
- Suzanne Girod (1871–1925), French tennis player
- Thomas Girod (born 1983), French luger
