= Pierre Girard =

Pierre Girard may refer to:

- Pierre Girard (cardinal) (died 1415), French bishop and Cardinal
- Pierre-Simon Girard (1765–1836), French mathematician and engineer
- Pierre Girard (painter) (1806–1872), French painter
- Pierre Girard (sailor) (1926–2022), Swiss sailor and Olympic medalist
