= Girardville =

Girardville may refer to:

- Girardville, Pennsylvania, United States
- Girardville, Quebec, Canada
