= William Baillie (18th century artist) =

British artist

William Baillie (1752/3–Calcutta 1799) was a British artist working in India in the late 18th century.

== Life ==
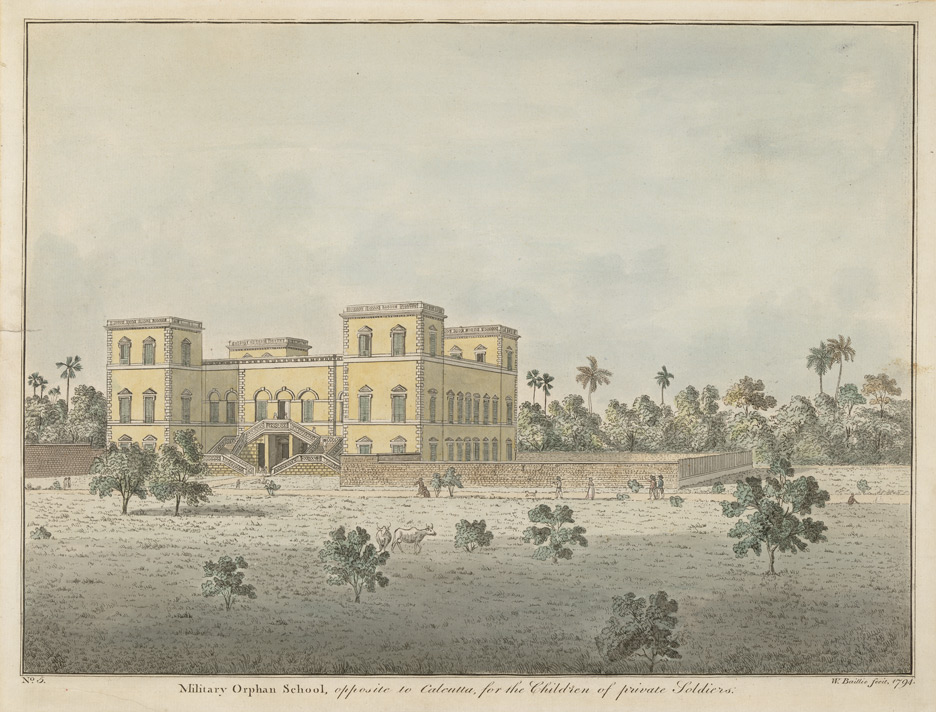
Levett's distillery later the Military Orphan School Calcutta Aquatint (1794) by William Baillie

William Baillie was born in 1752 or 1753. He went to India as a cadet in the Bengal Infantry in 1777, transferred to the Engineers in 1778 and participated in surveying work along the Hooghly River.

He went on leave without pay in 1785 and the next year started a weekly newspaper, the Calcutta Chronicle. He finally resigned from the army in 1788 with the intention of pursuing a career as an artist, but in 1792 he became secretary of the Free School Society in Calcutta and superintendent of the school itself. In the same year he published his "Plan of Calcutta", a reduced version of a map made by Lt. Col. Mark Wood in 1784–5. In 1794 he published a set of hand-coloured aquatints entitled Twelve Views of Calcutta. The plates, each measuring 15 by 11 inches, were advertised as "executed in the manner of stained drawings". A further set of eight prints "of the ruins of Gour and Rajmehal" was announced as completed in 1798, but no impressions have been traced.

In a letter of 1795 he told his fellow-artist Ozias Humphry that he had wasted a lot of time painting landscapes, adding that "it is a pleasing pursuit, but not a pot-boiling one." He died in Calcutta in 1799 at the age of 46.
