= Jean Grandjean =

Dutch painter, draftsman, and watercolourist

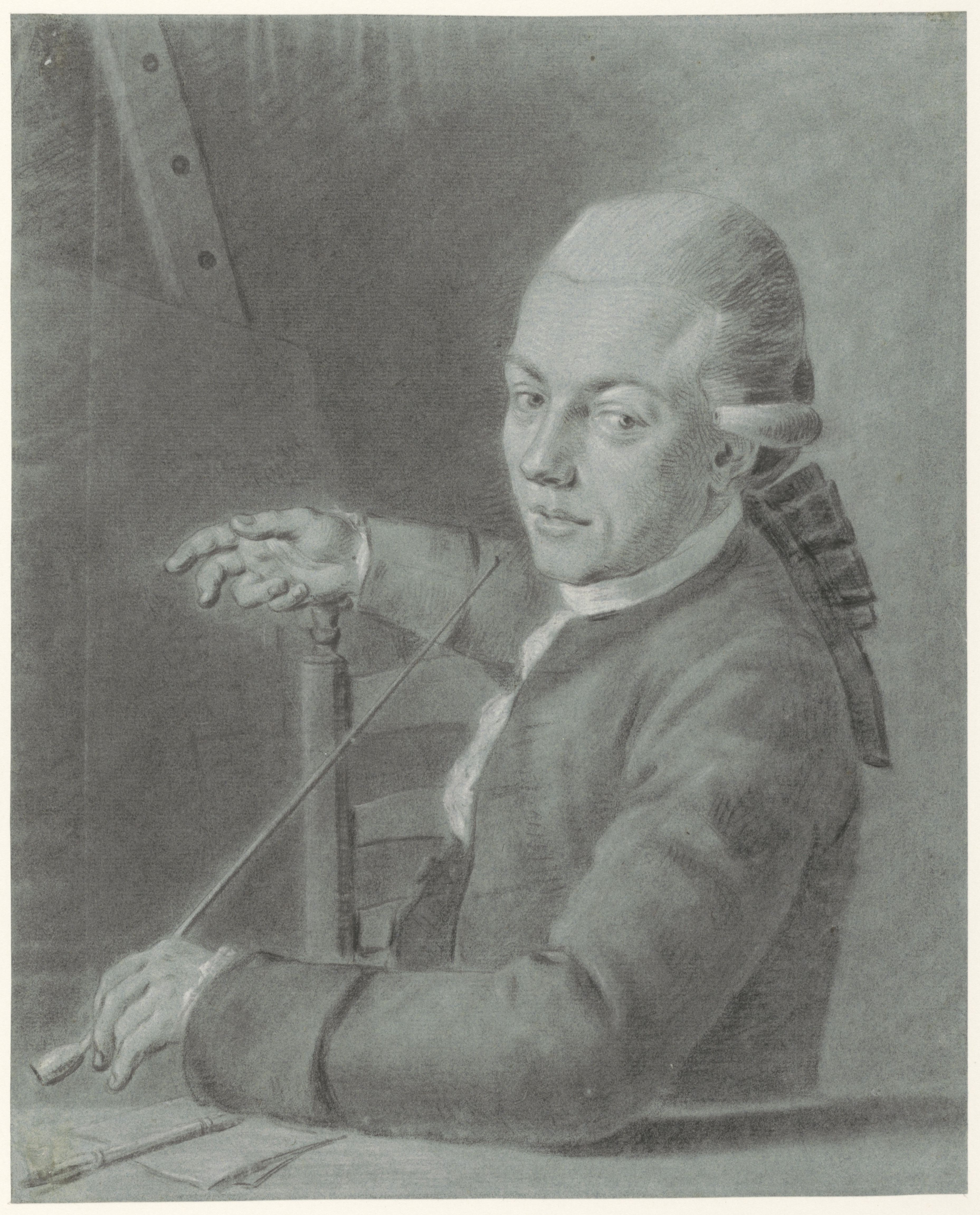
Jean Grandjean, 1777, by Jan Tersteeg

Jean Grandjean (5 February 1752 – 12 November 1781) was a Dutch painter, draftsman, and watercolourist.

Grandjean was born in Amsterdam. He studied under Jurriaan Andriessen at the Stadstekenacademie (City Drawing School). He painted genre art, historical works, and landscapes. He traveled around studying and working in Germany and Italy. He died in Rome on 12 November 1781.

The Rijksmuseum Amsterdam owns over 70 of his drawings.

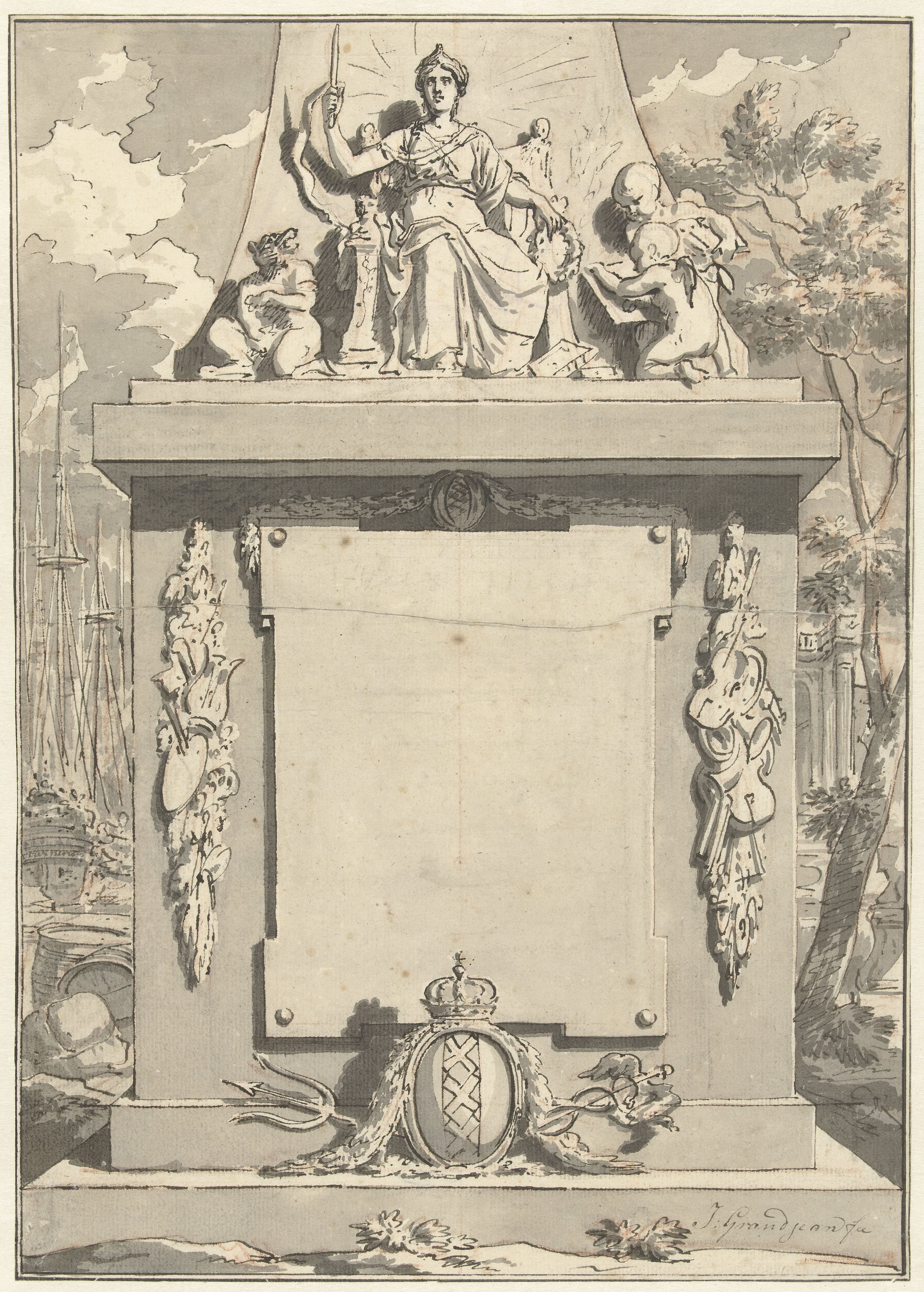

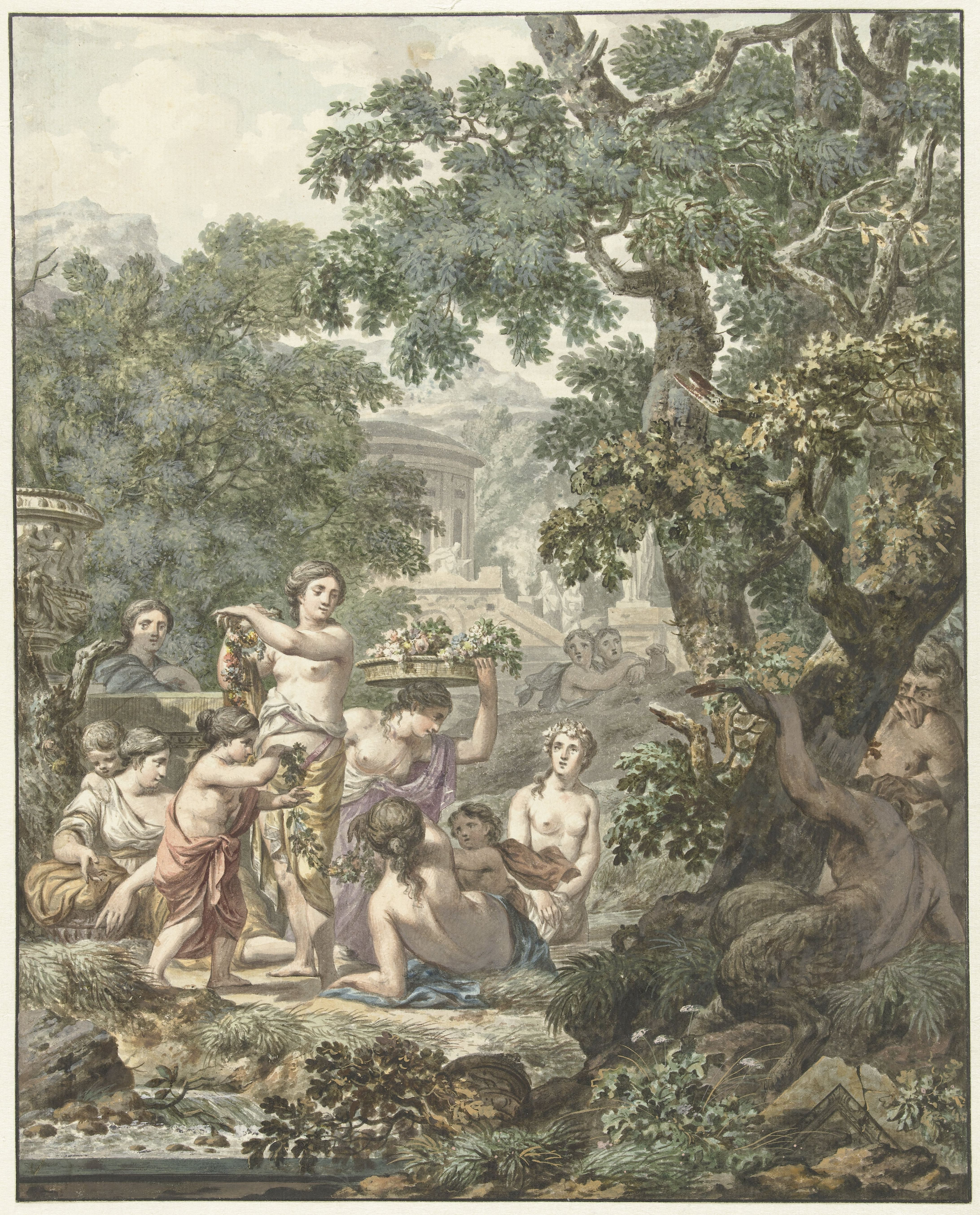

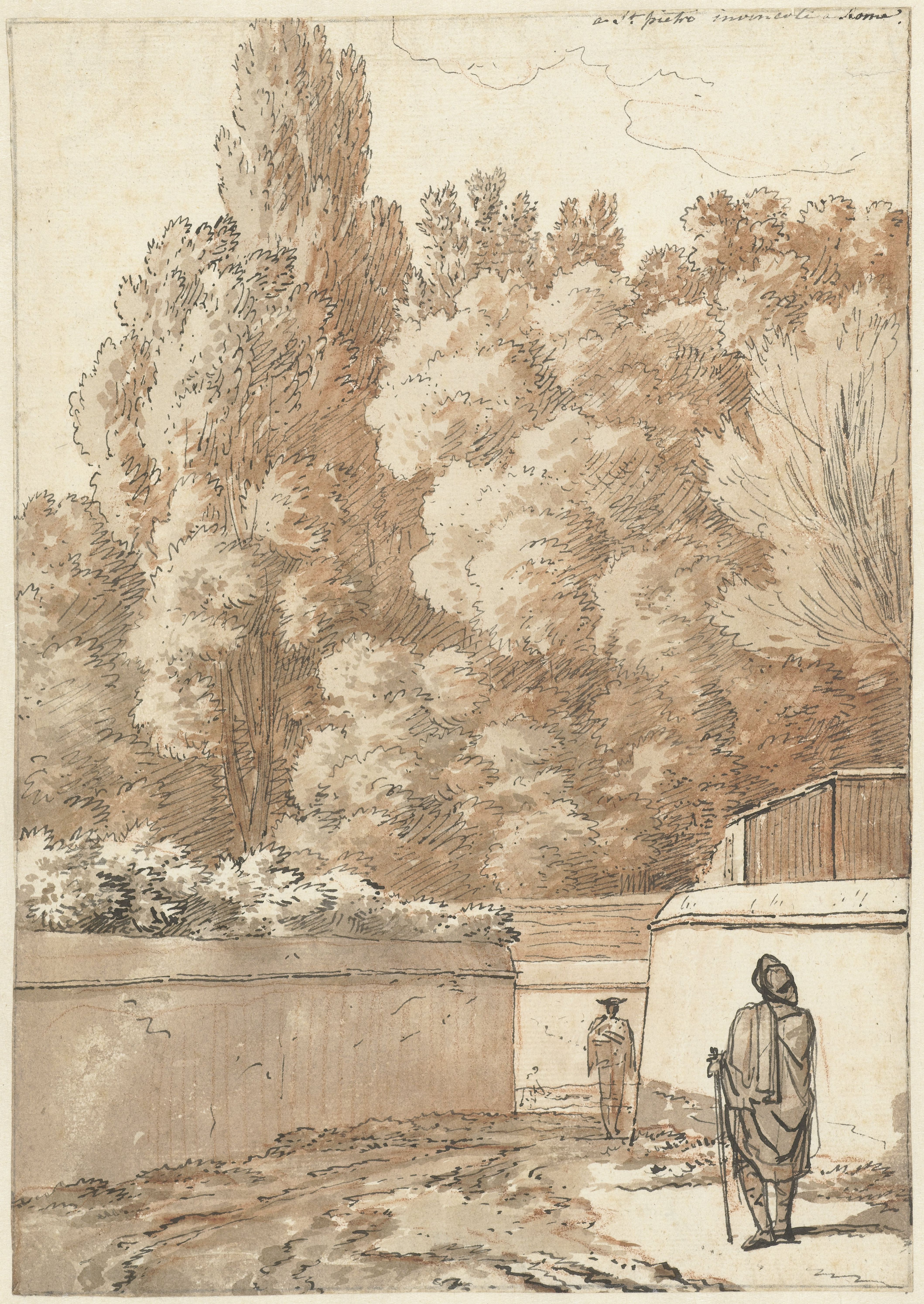

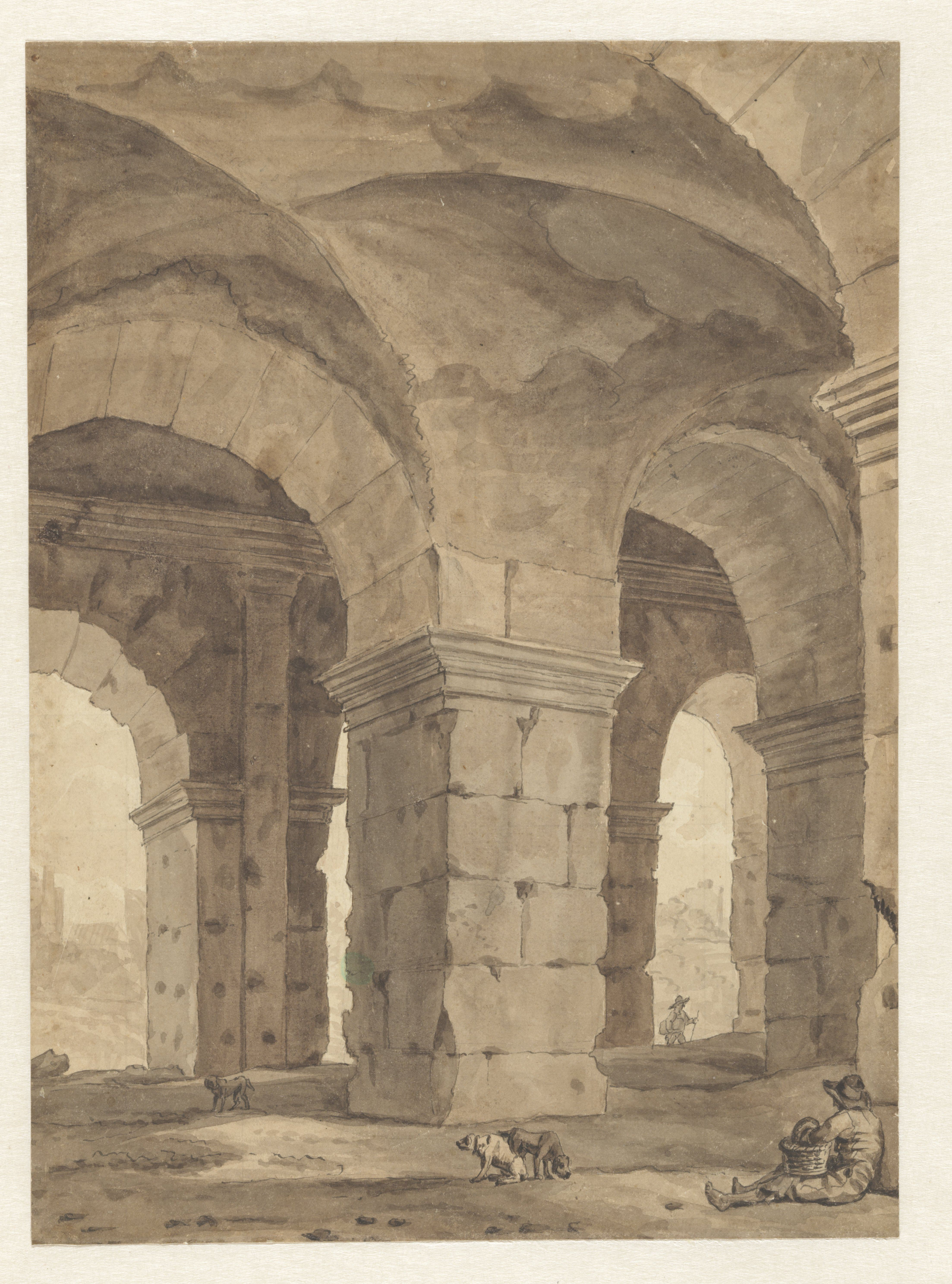

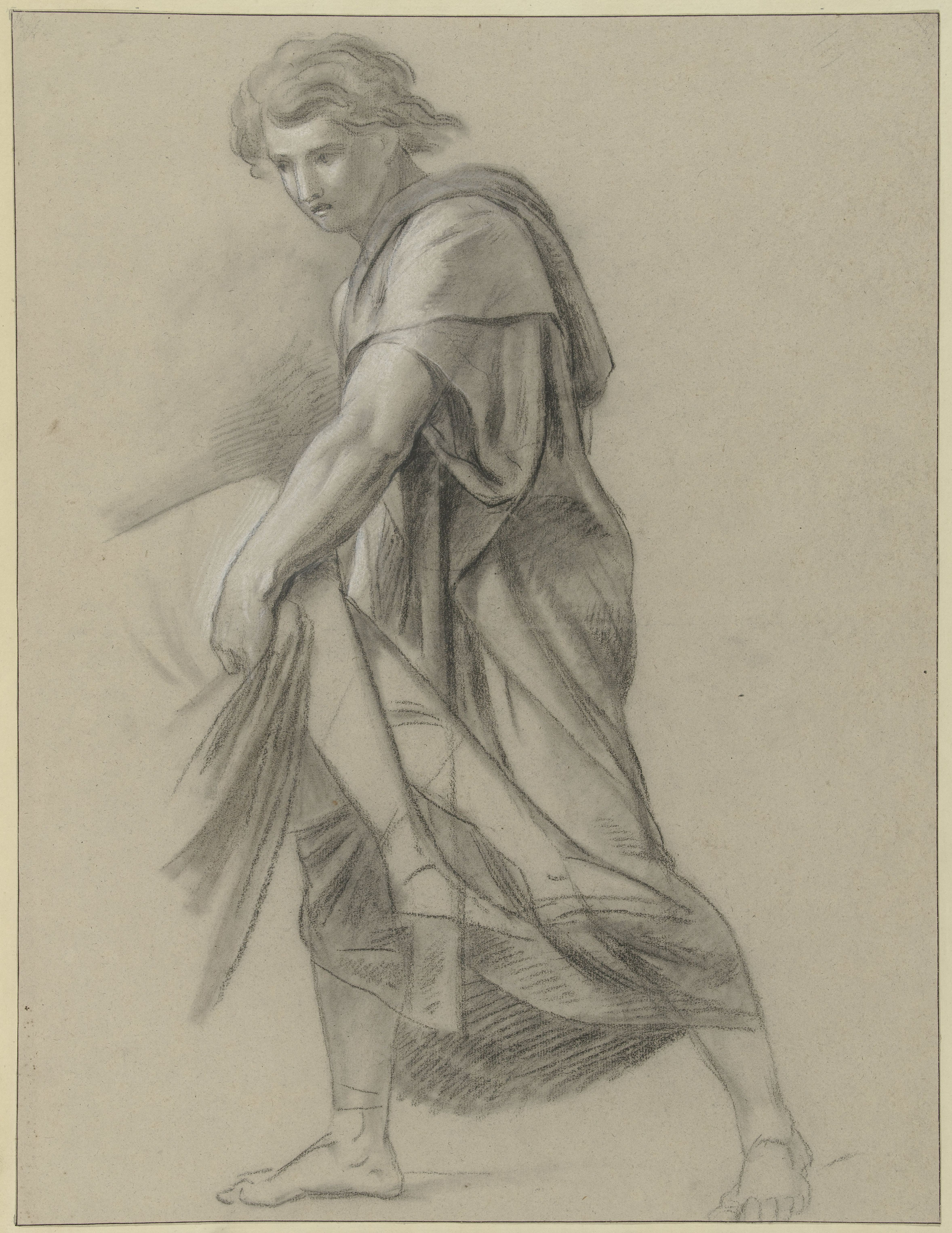
