= Girardot (surname) =

Girardot (English: /ʒiːˈrɑːrdoʊ/, French: [ʒiʁaʁdo]) is a French surname. Notable people with the surname include:

- Ana Girardot (born 1988), French stage, film and television actress
- Annie Girardot (1931–2011), French actress
- Atanasio Girardot (1791–1813), Colombian revolutionary leader
- Ernest Gustave Girardot (1840–1904), Anglo-French painter
- Etienne Girardot (1856–1939), Anglo-French actor
- Hippolyte Girardot (born 1955), French actor
- Léonce Girardot (1864–1922), French motorist and motor manufacturer
- Maurice Girardot (1921–2016), French basketball player
