= Warwick Castle, East Front from the Courtyard =

Painting by Canaletto

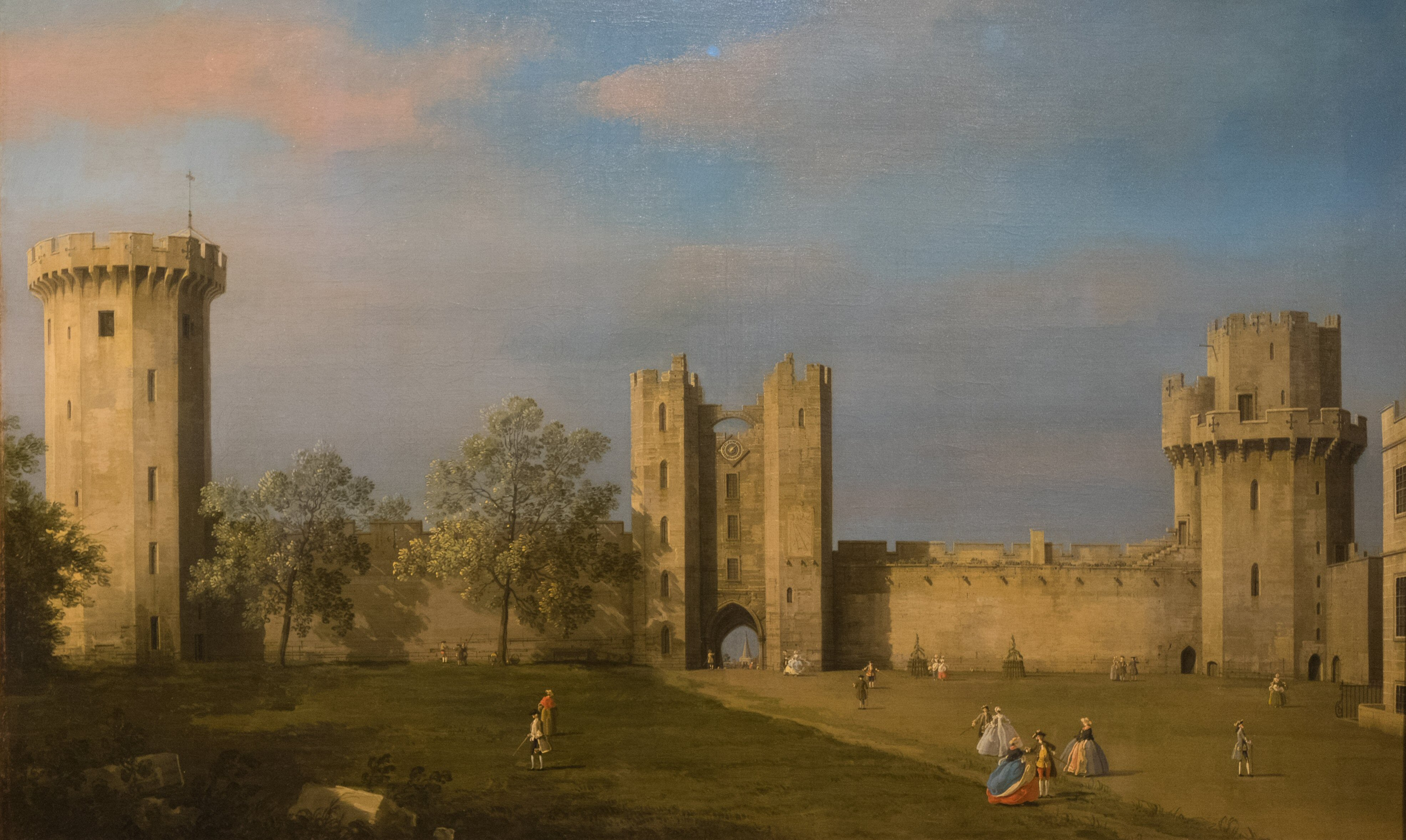
- Artist: Canaletto
- Year: 1752
- Type: Oil on canvas, landscape painting
- Dimensions: 75 cm × 122 cm (30 in × 48 in)
- Location: Birmingham Museum and Art Gallery, Birmingham

Warwick Castle, East Front from the Outer Court is a 1752 landscape painting by the Italian artist Canaletto. It presents a view of Warwick Castle in the English Midlands, seen from the eastern side across the lawn with Guys Tower, the Clock Tower and Entrance Gate all prominent.

It was produced during Canaletto's decade-long stay in Britain before his return to his native Venice. Canaletto was commissioned to produce a number of depictions of Warwick Castle, all of which were likely hung by Lord Brooke in his London residence. Today it is in the collection of the Birmingham Museum and Art Gallery, having been acquired in 1978. Another picture with a different view of the east side of the castle, produced the same here by Canaletto, is also held in Birmingham .

== See also ==
- List of paintings by Canaletto

== Bibliography ==
- Baetjer, Katharine & Links, J. G. Canaletto. Metropolitan Museum of Art, 1989.
- Farrington, Jane. Canaletto & England. Merrel Holberton, 1993.
- Links, J.G. Canaletto, the Complete Paintings. Granada, 1981.
