= Northumberland House (painting) =

1752 Painting by Canaletto

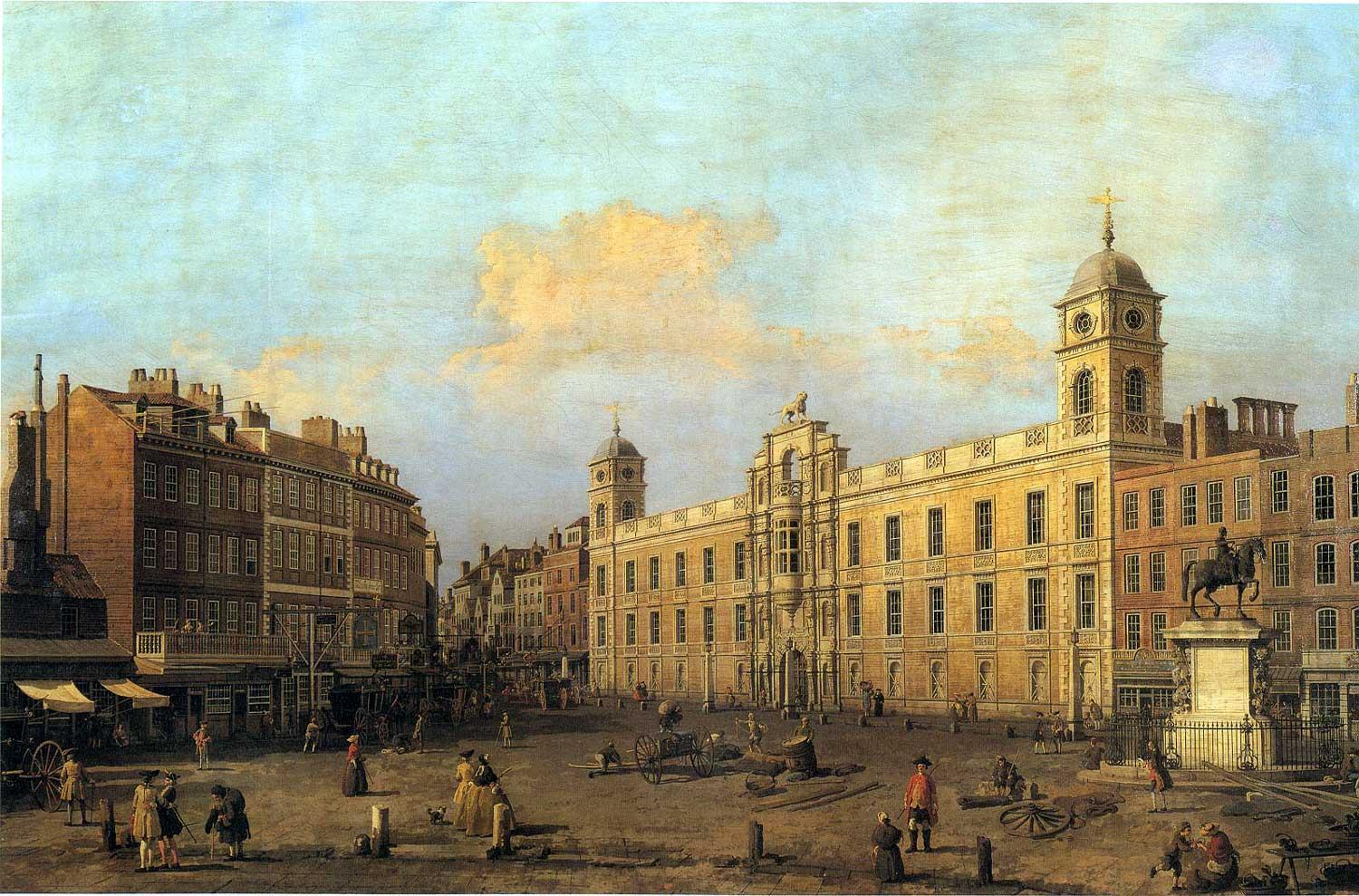
- Artist: Canaletto
- Year: 1752
- Type: Oil on canvas
- Dimensions: 84 cm × 137 cm (33 in × 54 in)
- Location: Private collection

Northumberland House is a 1752 landscape painting by the Italian artist Canaletto. Painted during his nine-year stay in Britain, he depicts Northumberland House on the Strand by Charing Cross in London, close to the location of the later Trafalgar Square. Canaletto was commissioned by the Westminster property's owner Sir Hugh Smithson, then 2nd Earl of Northumberland (later the Duke of Northumberland). Smithson was his most important patron during his time in England. The work shows Northumberland House at the middle of the eighteenth century. On the right of the painting is Hubert Le Sueur's Equestrian statue of Charles I.

== Bibliography ==
- Constable, William George. Canaletto: Giovanni Antonio Canal, 1697–1768 : Catalogue. Art Gallery of Toronto, 1964.
- Hitchcock, Tim. Down and Out in Eighteenth-Century London. A&C Black, 2004.
- Kowalczyk, Bożena Anna . Canaletto, 1697–1768. Silvana Editoriale, 2018.
- Liversidge, M.J.H. & Farrington, Jane. Canaletto & England. Merrel Holberton, 1993.
- Martineau, Jane & Robison, Andrew. The Glory of Venice: Art in the Eighteenth Century. Yale University Press, 1994
- Uzanne, Octave. Canaletto. Parkstone International, 2023.

== See also ==
- List of paintings by Canaletto
