= Joseph Girard =

Joseph Girard may refer to:

- Joseph Girard (Canadian politician) (1853–1933), Canadian politician
- Joseph Girard (Swiss politician) (1815–1890), Swiss politician
- Joseph Girard (historian) (1881–1962), French historian, librarian and museum curator
- Joseph Basil Girard (1846–1918), American military doctor and frontier artist
- Joseph W. Girard (1871–1949), American actor
- Joseph Girard III (born 2000) American basketball player
