= Jean-Baptiste Giraud =

French sculptor

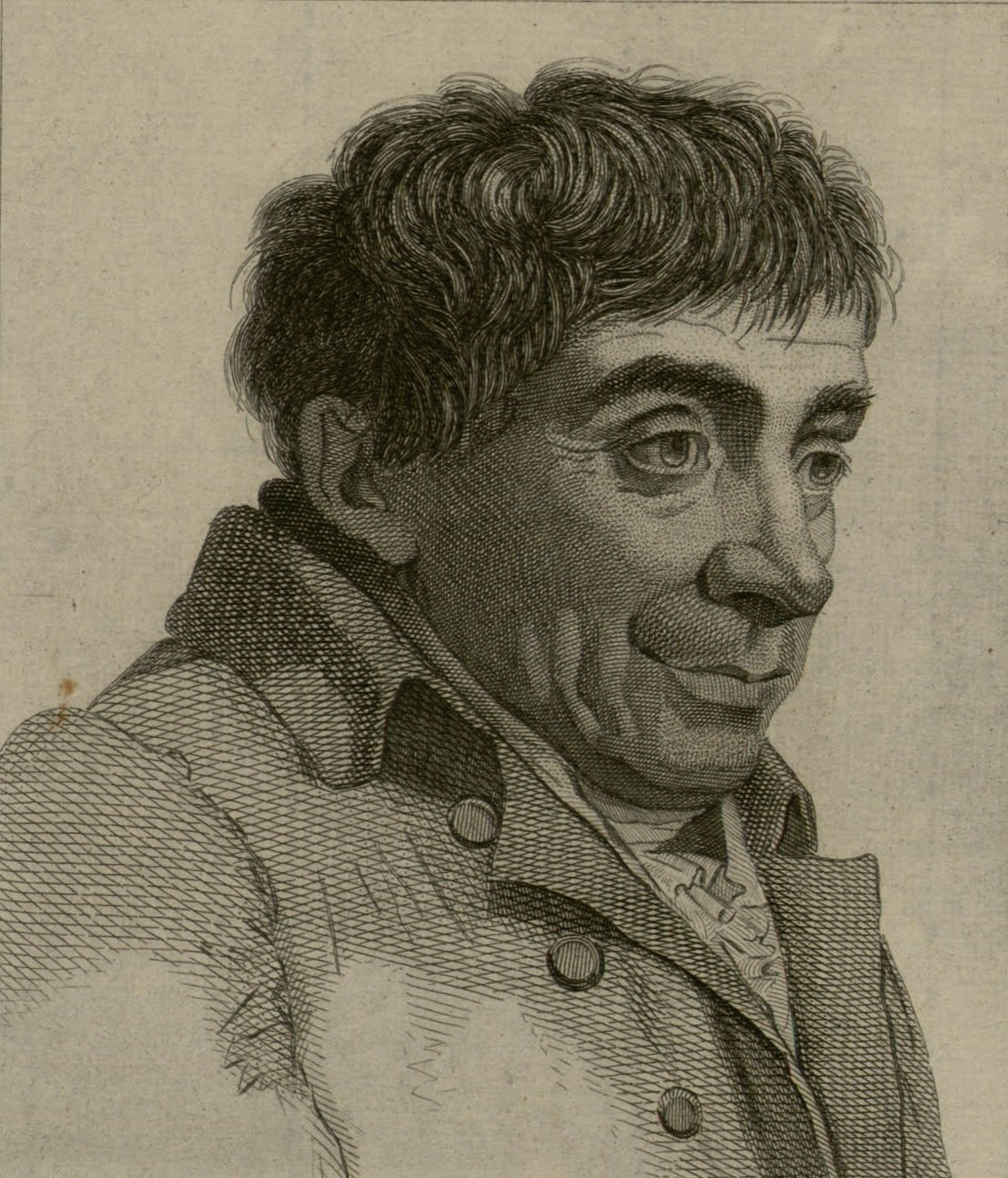
Portrait of Jean-Baptiste Giraud, after a drawing by Nicolas-André Monsiau

Jean-Baptiste Giraud (1752 – 14 February 1830) was a French sculptor.

== Biography ==
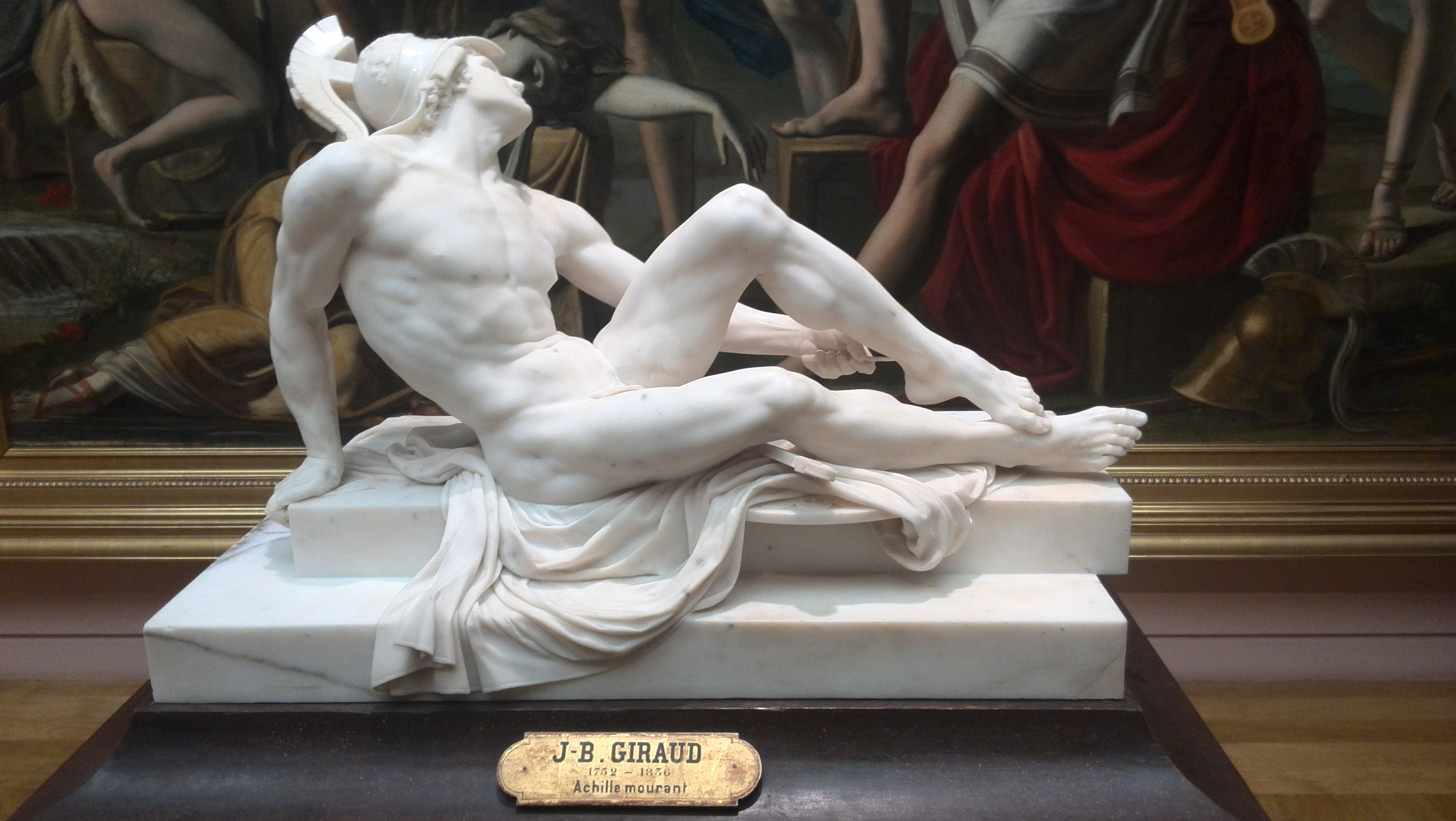
Achille mourant at the Musée Granet in Aix-en-Provence

Giraud was born in Aix-en-Provence. Made rich by his uncle's inheritance, he spent eight years in Italy, to study the Ancient Arts there. His works were only exhibited in the Salon of 1789 and he bought a town-house in place Vendôme in Paris, where he set up a free-entry museum for other artists. He died in Bouleaux (Fontenailles).

A piece of paper saying he was accepted at the Royal Academy for Painting and Sculpture, Achille blessé, is located in the Musée Granet in Aix-en-Provence.
