= Royal Academy Exhibition of 1815 =

1815 art exhibition in London

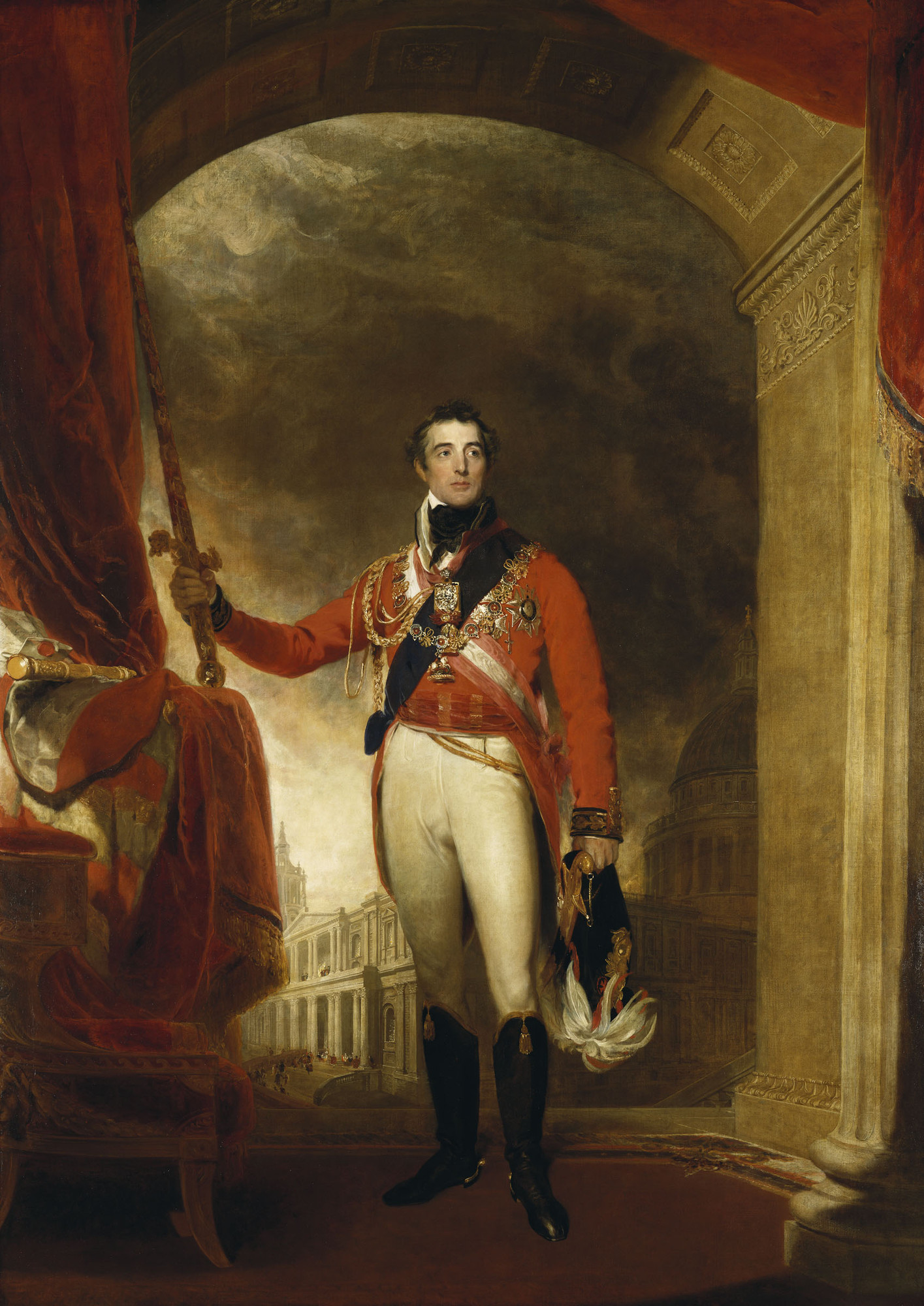
Portrait of the Duke of Wellington by Thomas Lawrence

The Royal Academy Exhibition of 1815 was the annual Summer Exhibition of the Royal Academy of Arts based in London. It was held at Somerset House from 1 May to 24 June 1815 during the Regency Era. It took place during the Hundred Days campaign after Napoleon's escape from Elba with the Battle of Waterloo taking place on 18 June shortly before the end of the exhibition.

Amongst the works on display were those celebrating the victory over Napoleon the previous year War of the Sixth Coalition. Notable amongst these were paintings by Thomas Lawrence depicting leading figures of the alliance that had defeated France in 1814. Portrait of Prince Metternich, featuring the Austrian foreign minister Klemens von Metternich. Two of the portraits, that of the Duke of Wellington and Portrait of Marshal Blücher, depicted the commanders of the Allied armies that would join forces to secure victory at Waterloo. They would both end up at the Waterloo Chamber of Windsor Castle. Lawrence also exhibited a portrait of the Prince Regent who had commissioned the paintings of the victorious allies. He is depicted in a Field-Marshal's uniform.

With the exception of the President of the Royal Academy Benjamin West's sketch for Christ Rejected, history paintings were notably absent with observers noting the quantity of landscape paintings on display. The Suffolk-born artist John Constable exhibited three drawings and five paintings including Boat-Building Near Flatford Mill and Stour Valley and Dedham Church. David Wilkie displayed a genre painting Distraining for Rent. William Collins exhibited three genre pictures including The Reluctant Departure. The landscape artist Augustus Wall Callcott submitted a view of Southampton Water.

Joseph Mallord William Turner displayed two notable works Crossing the Brook was a landscape featuring a view of the valley of the River Tamar on the border of Cornwall and Devon. Dido Building Carthage featured a scene of Ancient Carthage. Both paintings were strongly influenced by the Old Master Claude Lorrain whose style he admired. Turner also featured four watercolours and Fishing upon the Blythe-Sand, a work from 1809.

== Gallery ==
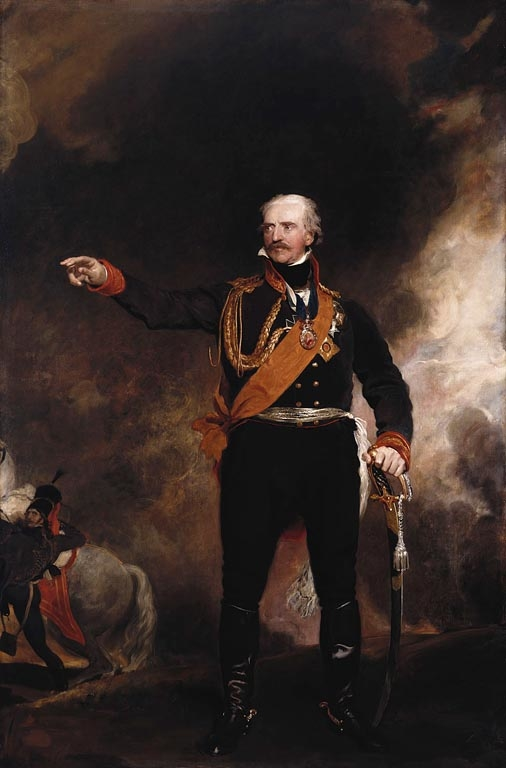
Portrait of Marshal Blücher by Thomas Lawrence

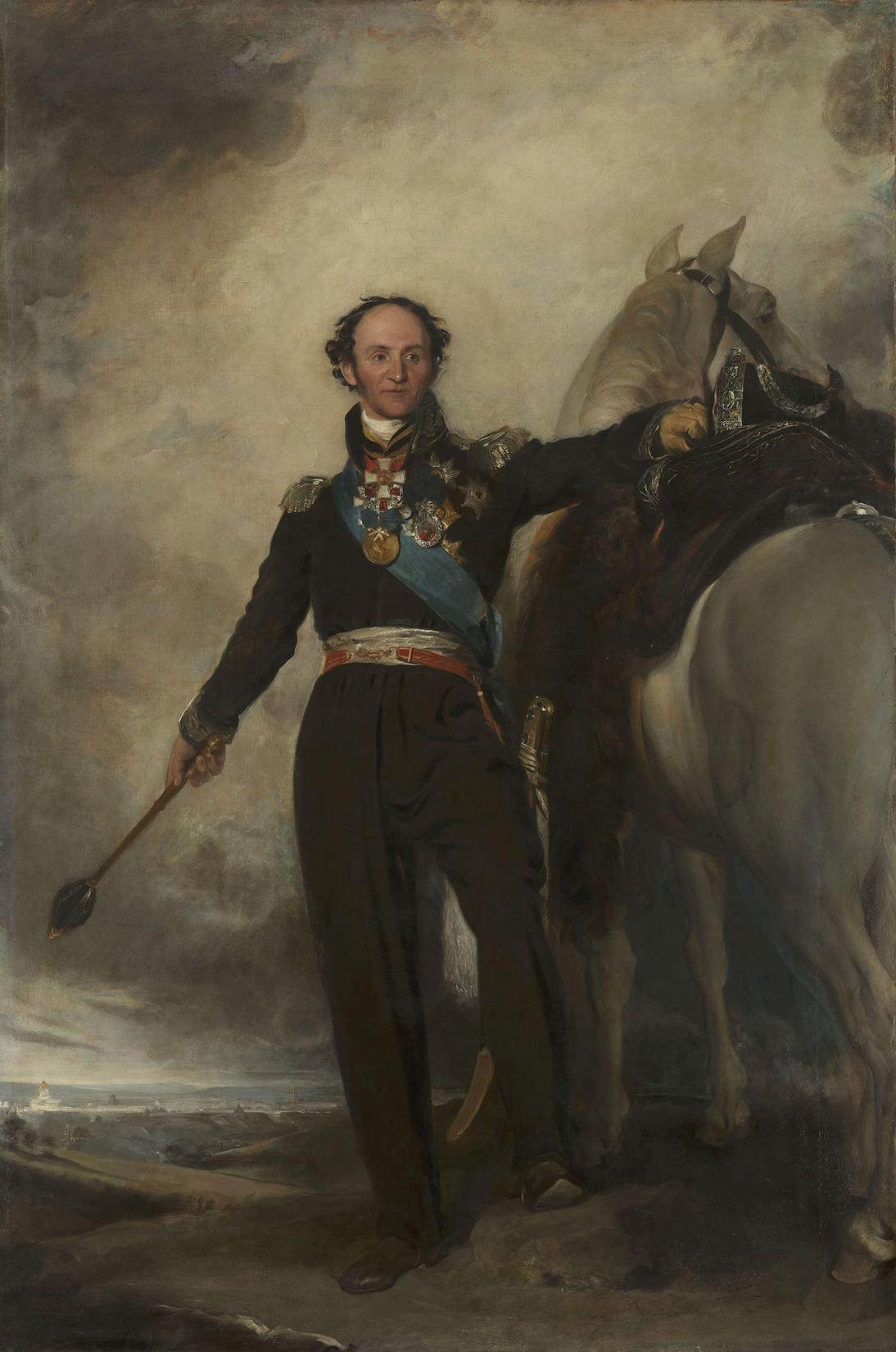
Portrait of Count Platov by Thomas Lawrence

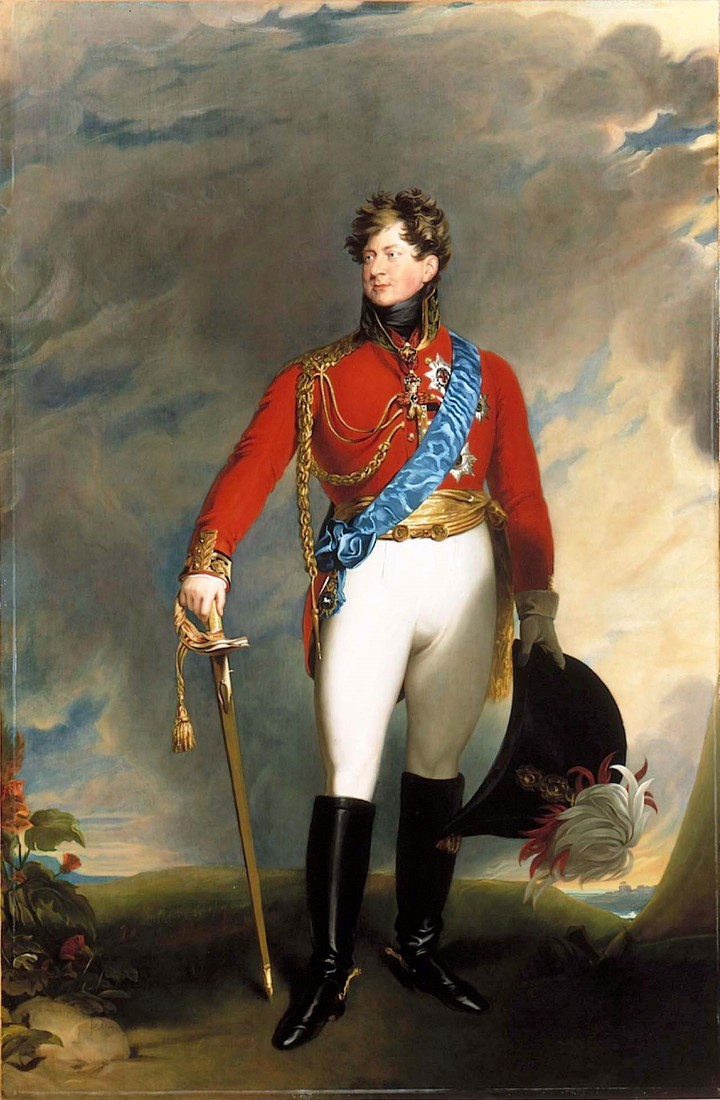
Portrait of the Prince Regent by Thomas Lawrence

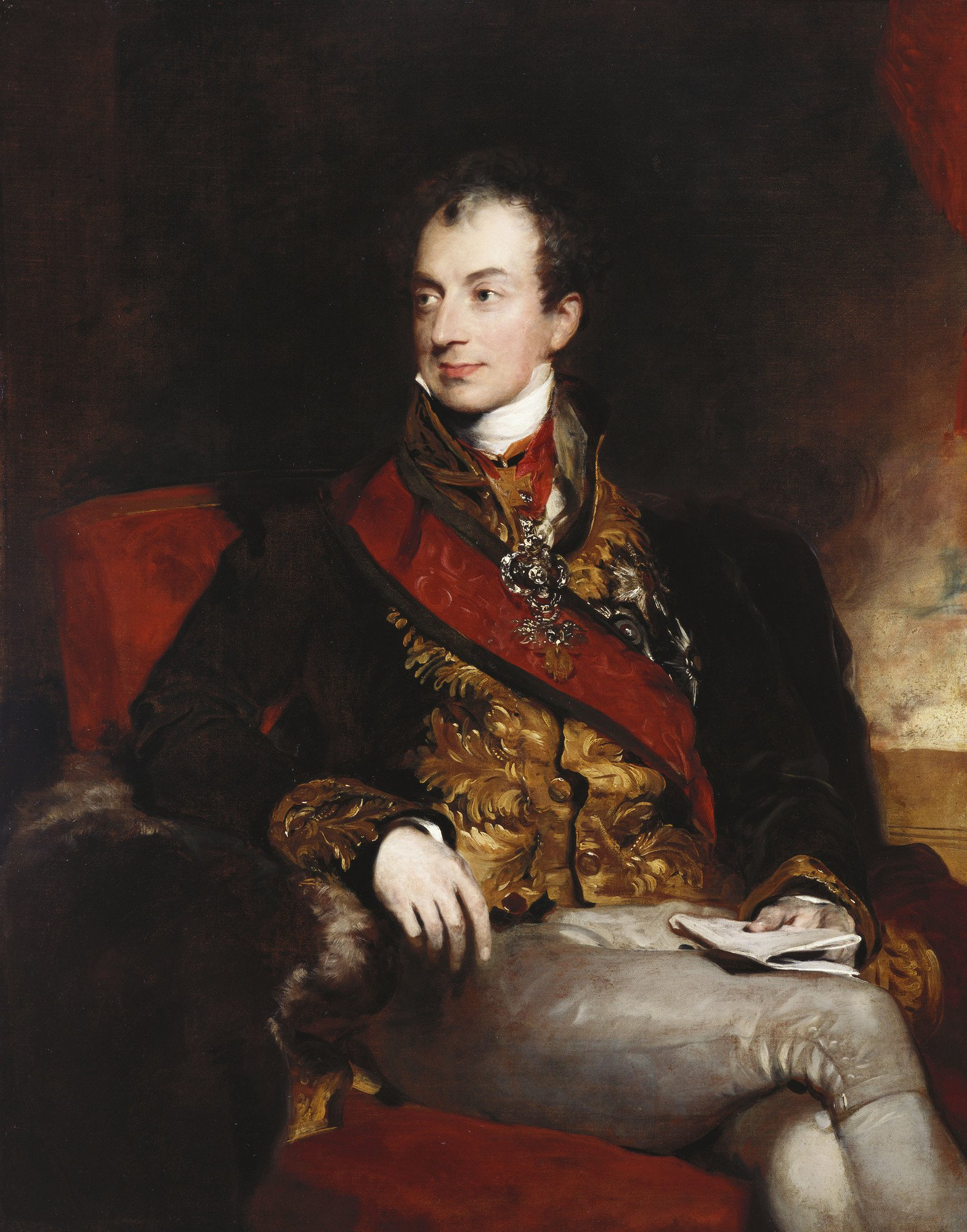
Portrait of Prince Metternich by Thomas Lawrence

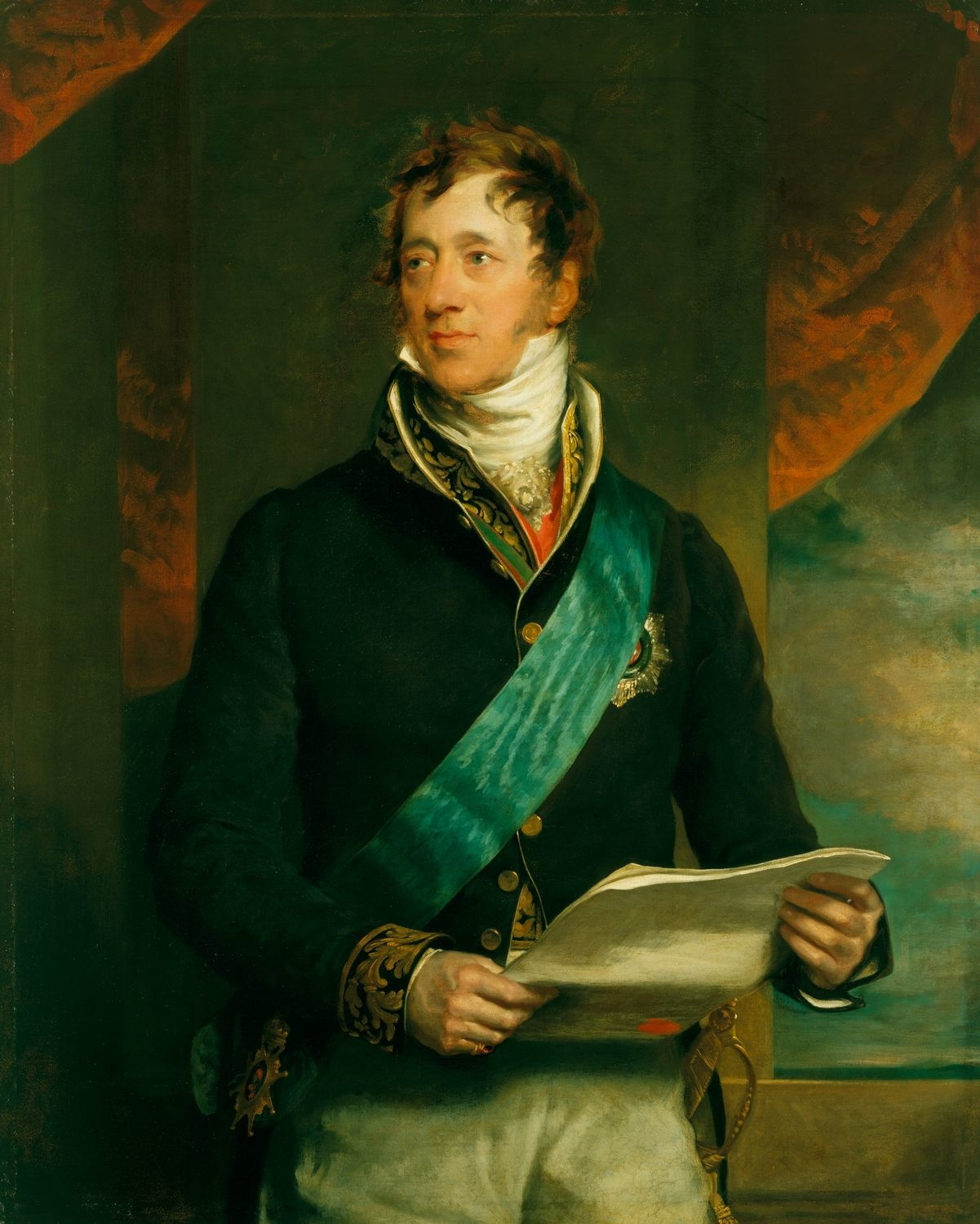
Portrait of Count Münster by Thomas Lawrence

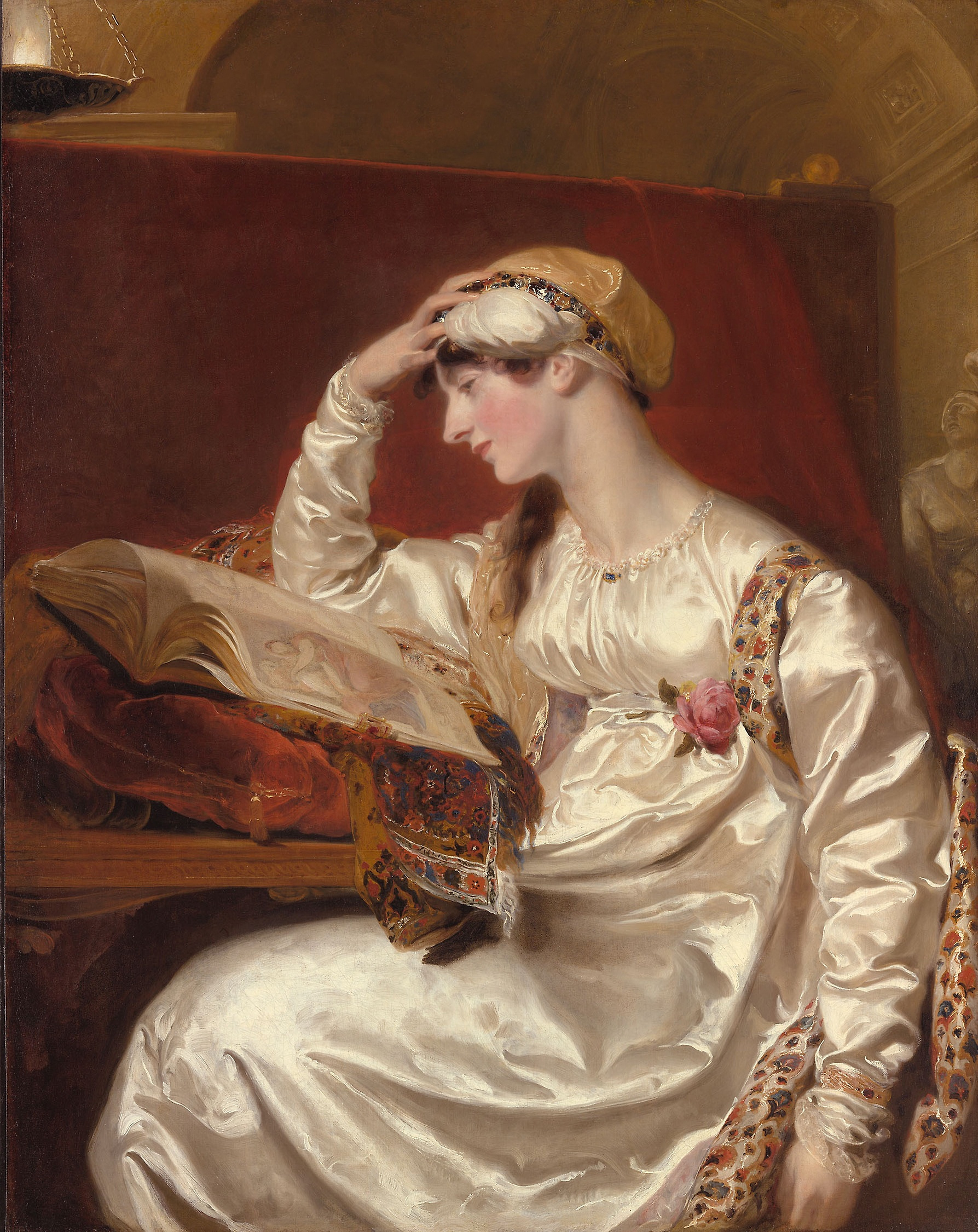
Portrait of Isabella Wolff by Thomas Lawrence

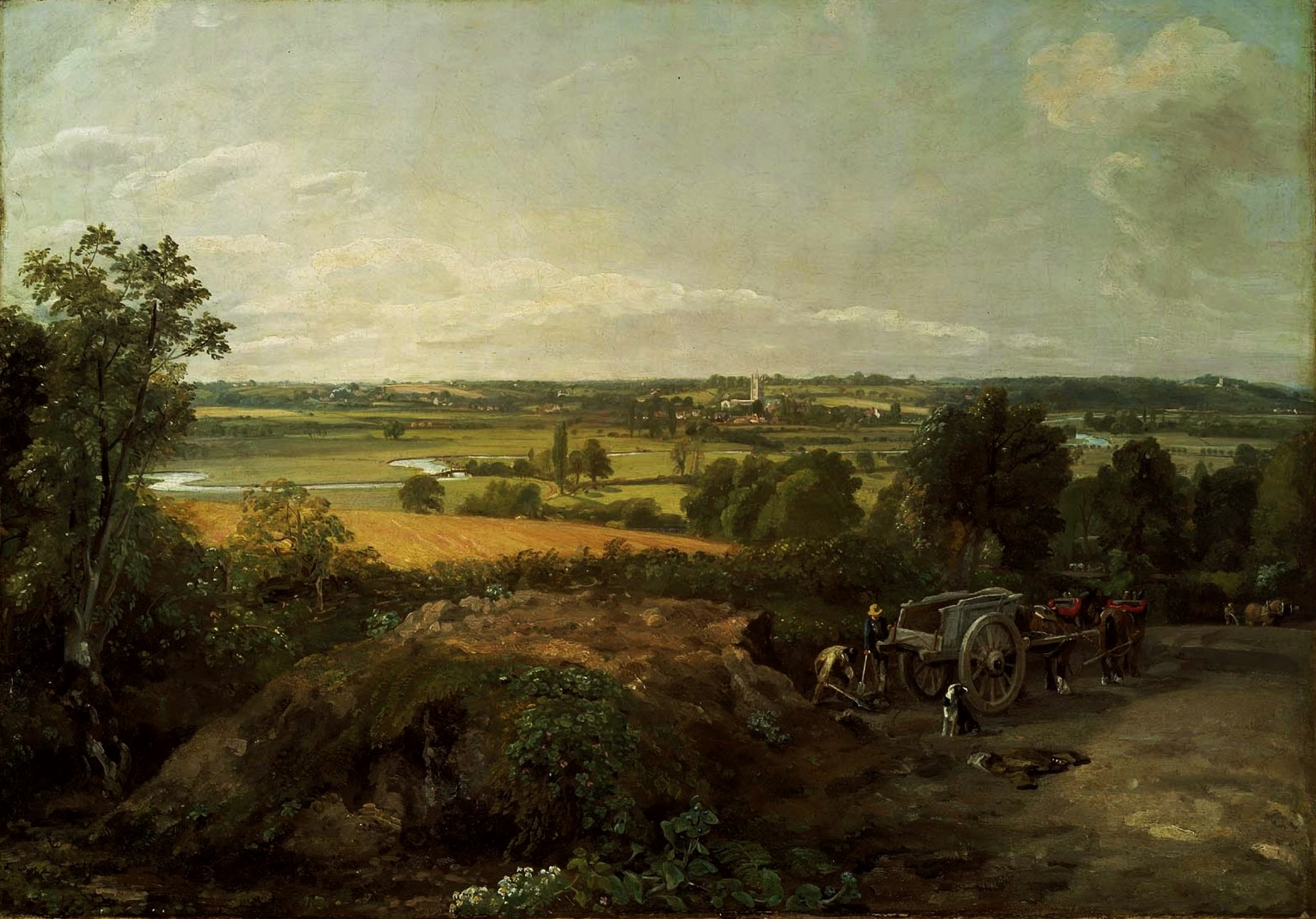
Stour Valley and Dedham Church by John Constable

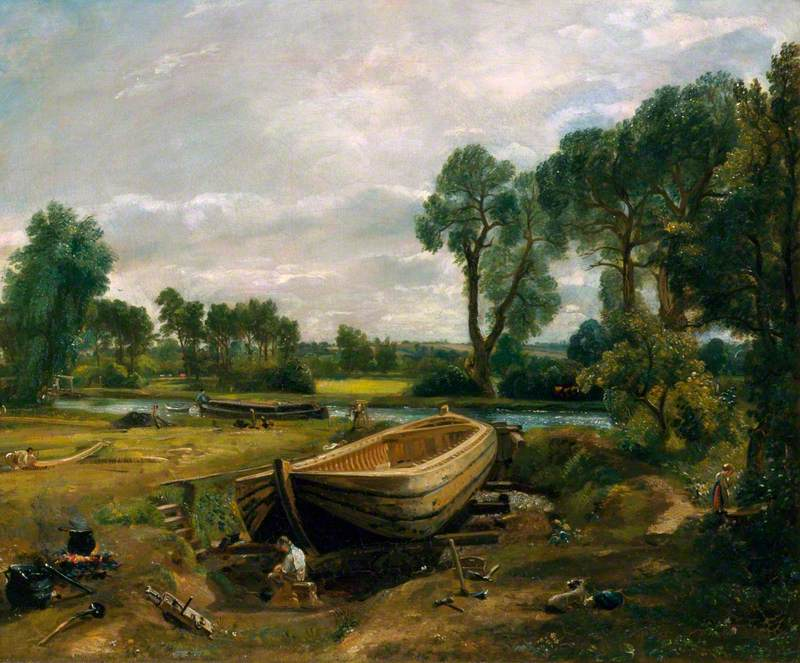
Boat-Building Near Flatford Mill by John Constable

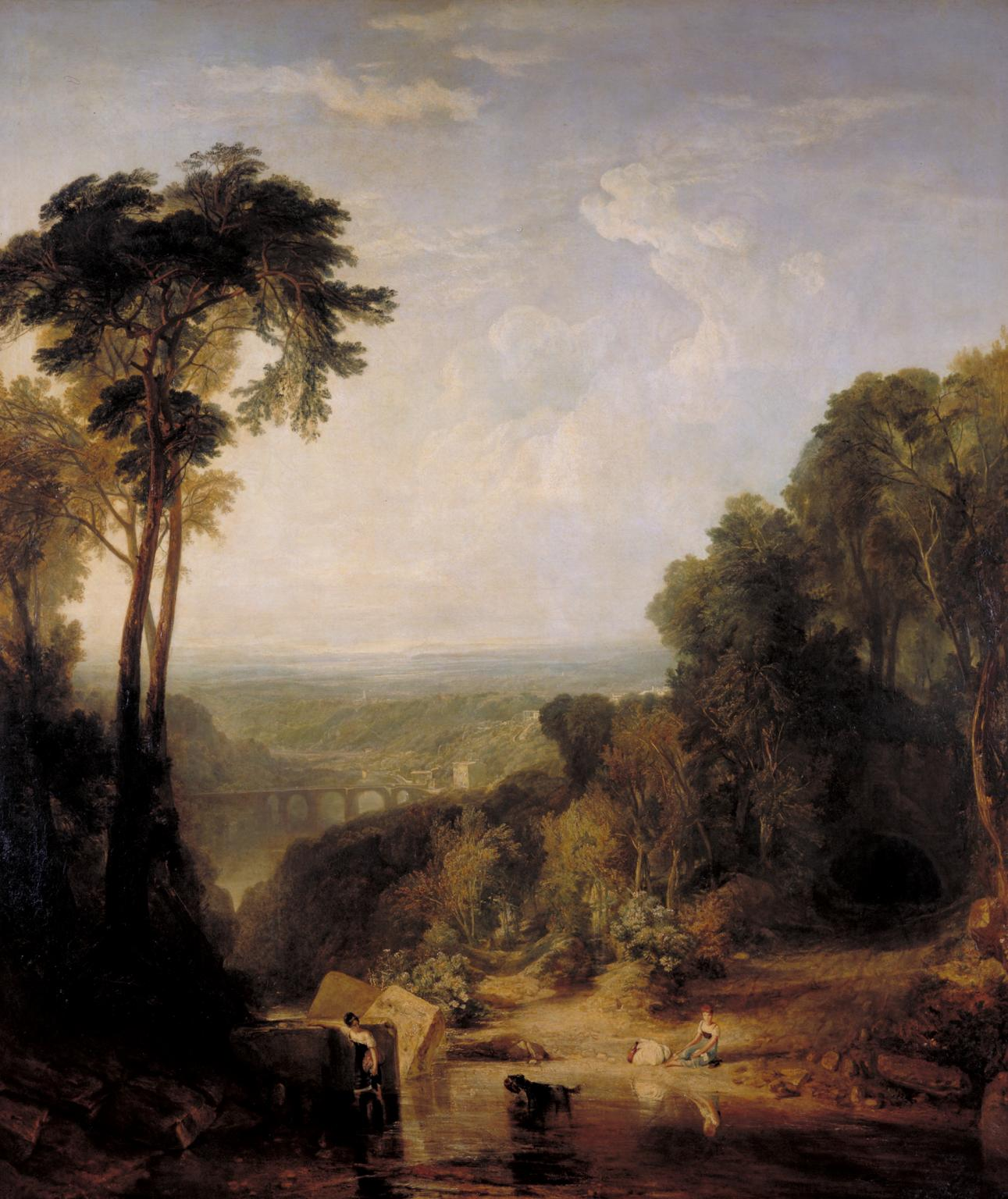
Crossing the Brook by J.M.W. Turner

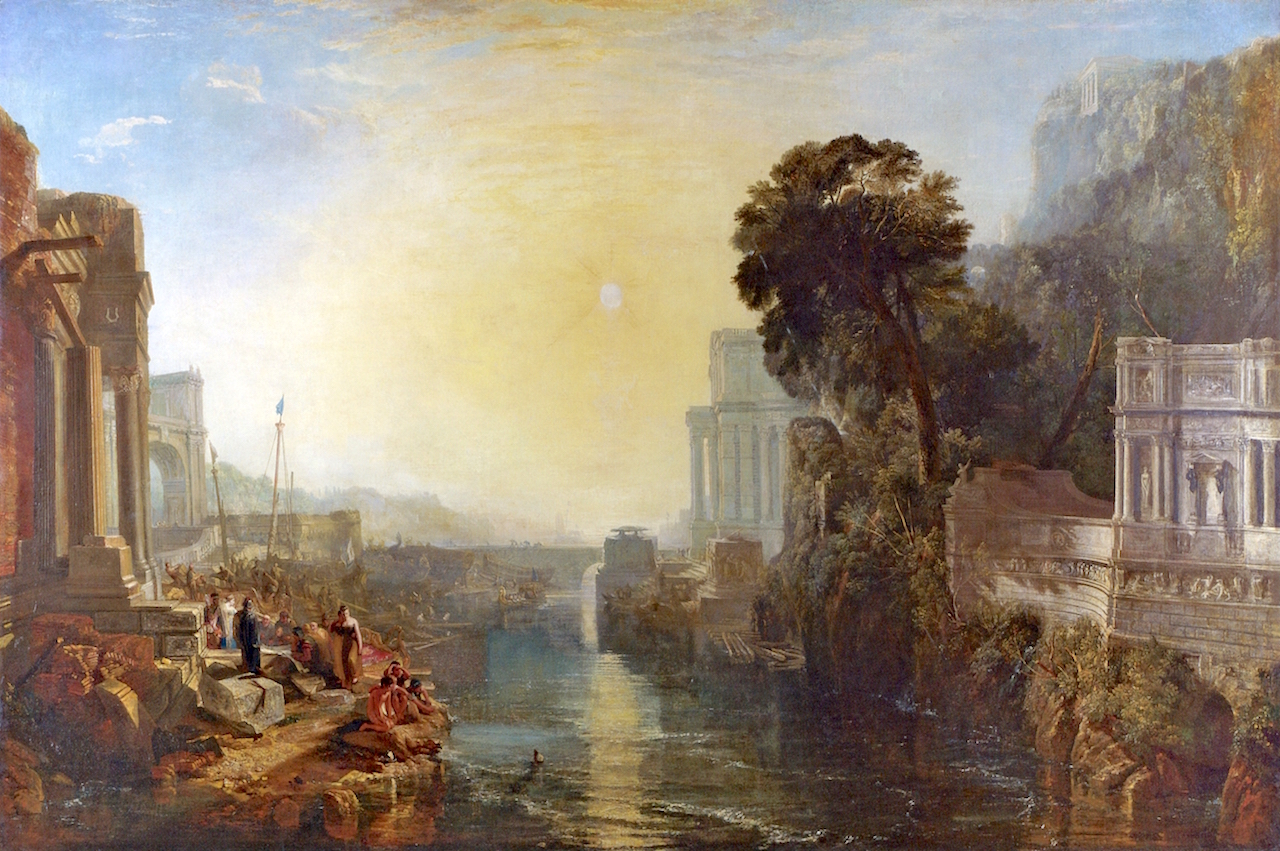
Dido Building Carthage by J.M.W. Turner

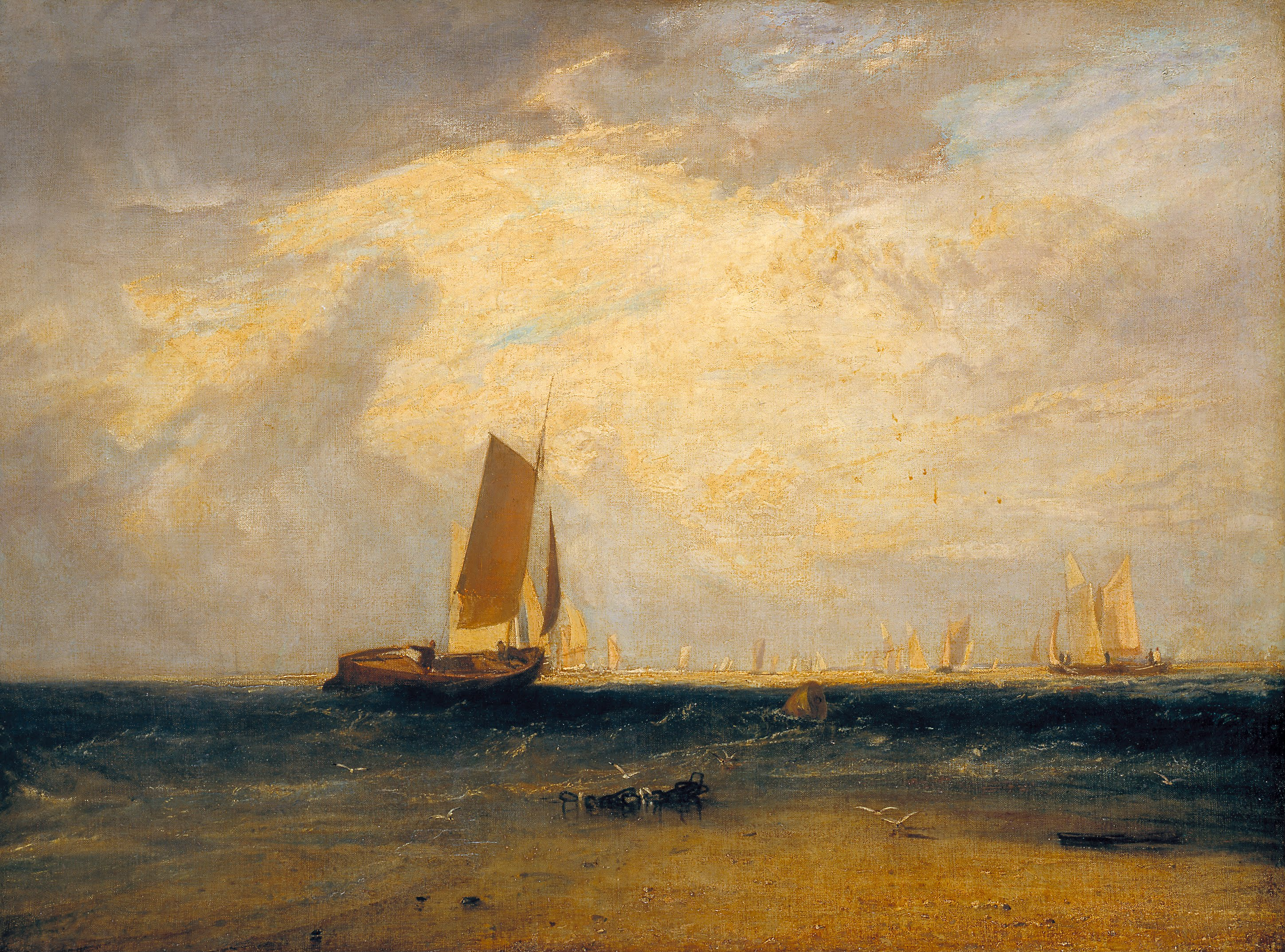
Fishing Upon the Blythe Sand by J.M.W. Turner

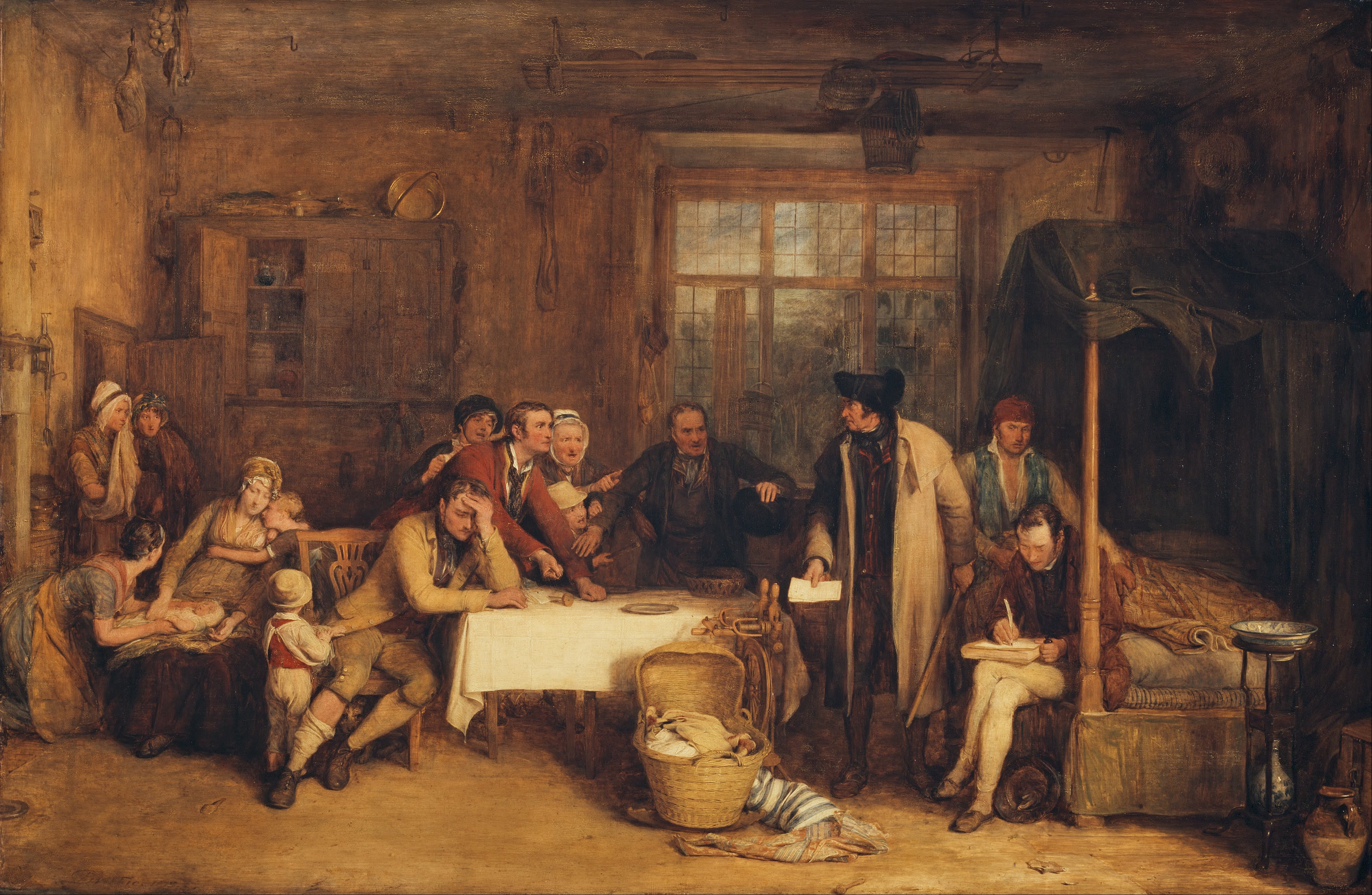
Distraining for Rent by David Wilkie

The Reluctant Departure by William Collins

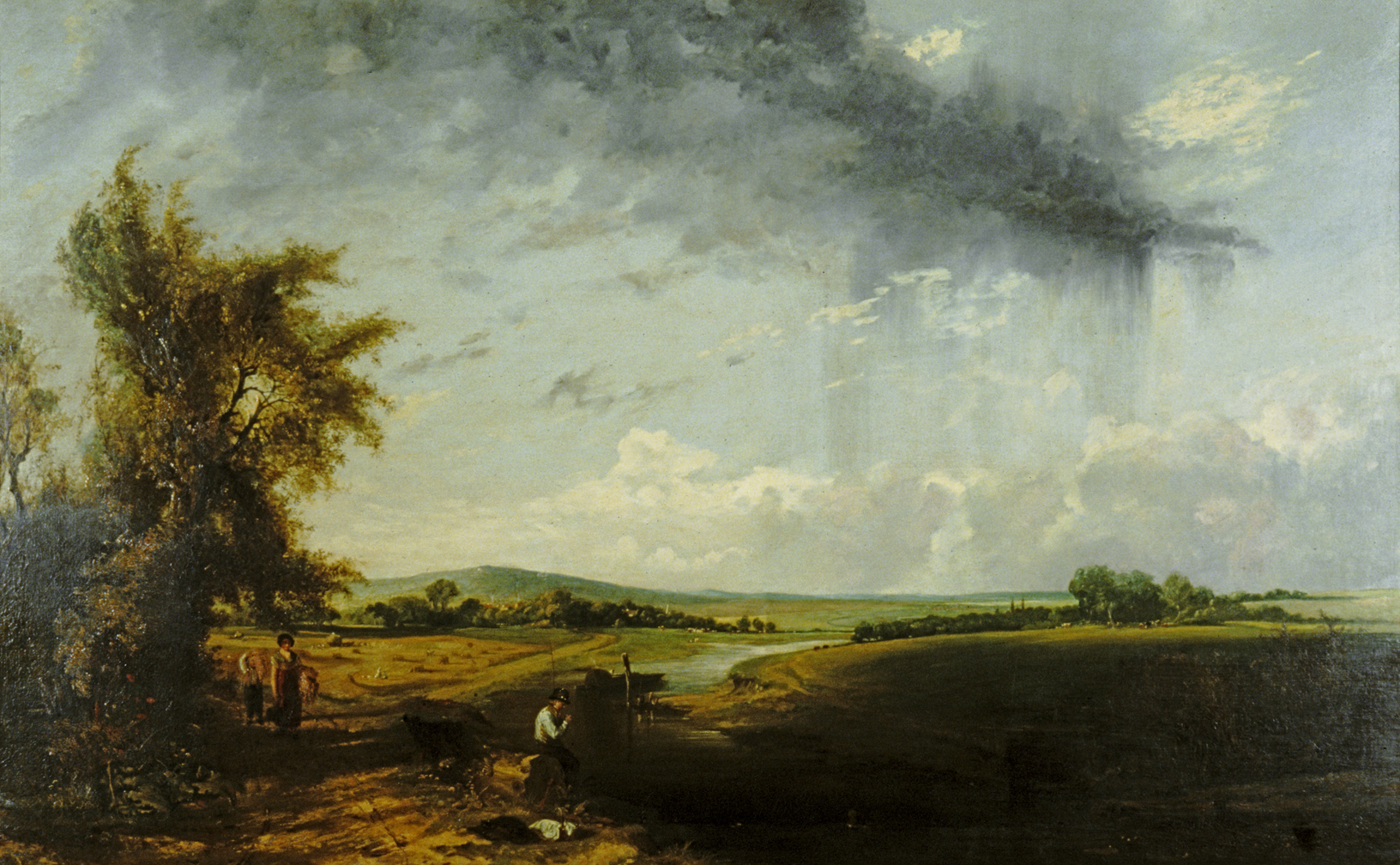
A Harvest Shower by William Collins

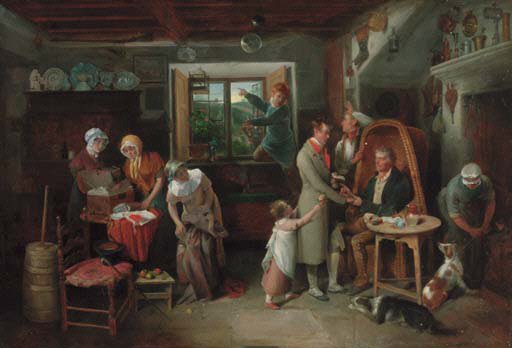
The Departure to London by Edward Bird

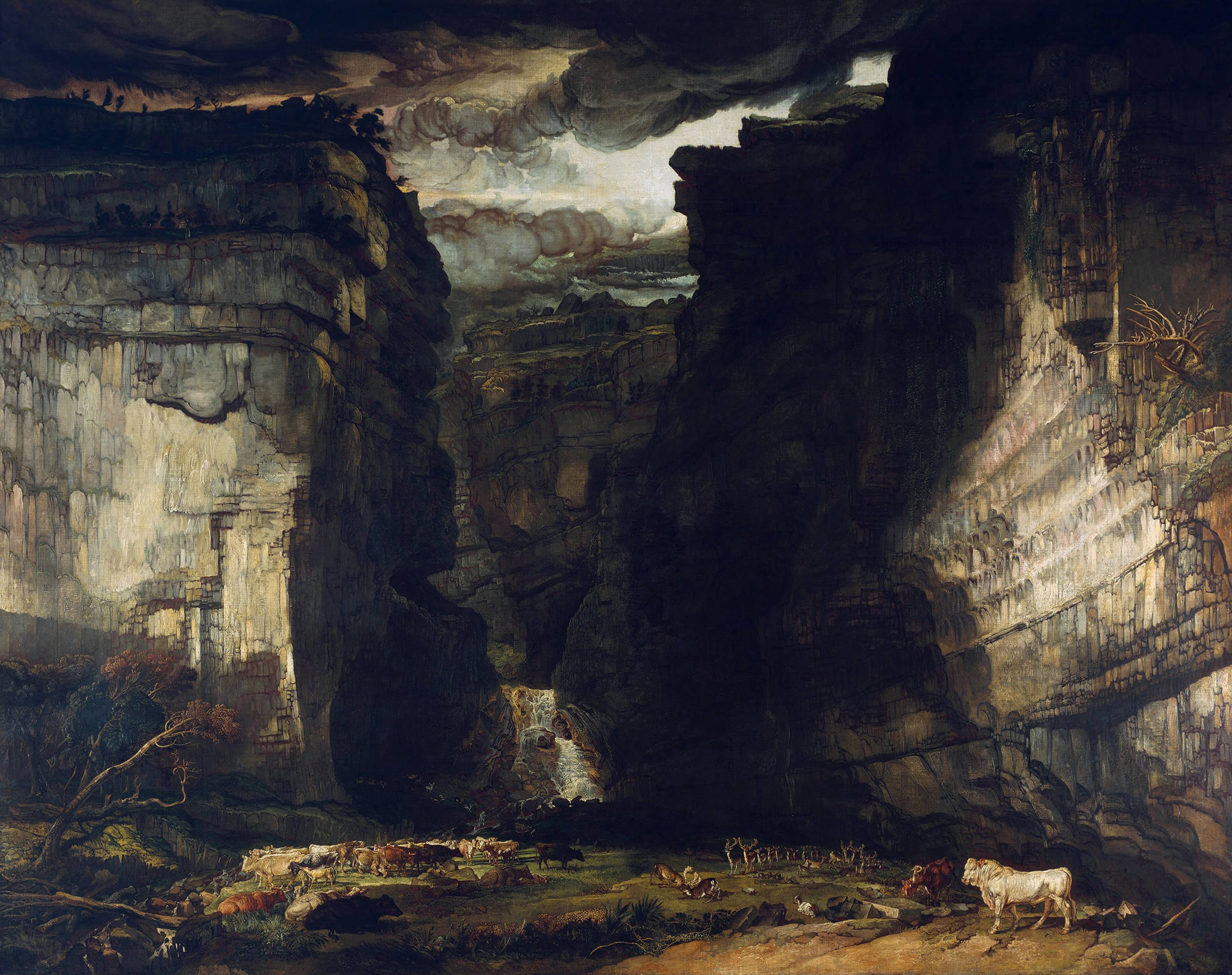
Gordale Scar by James Ward

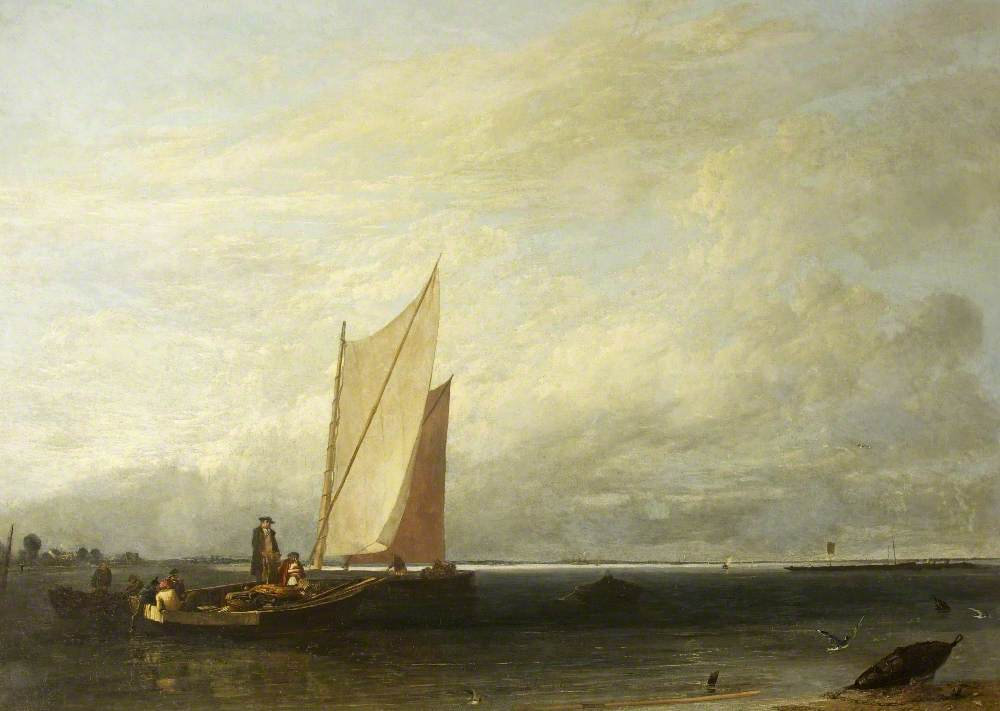
View of Southampton Water, Passage and Luggage Boats by Augustus Wall Callcott

The Prince Regent Received by the University and City of Oxford by George Jones

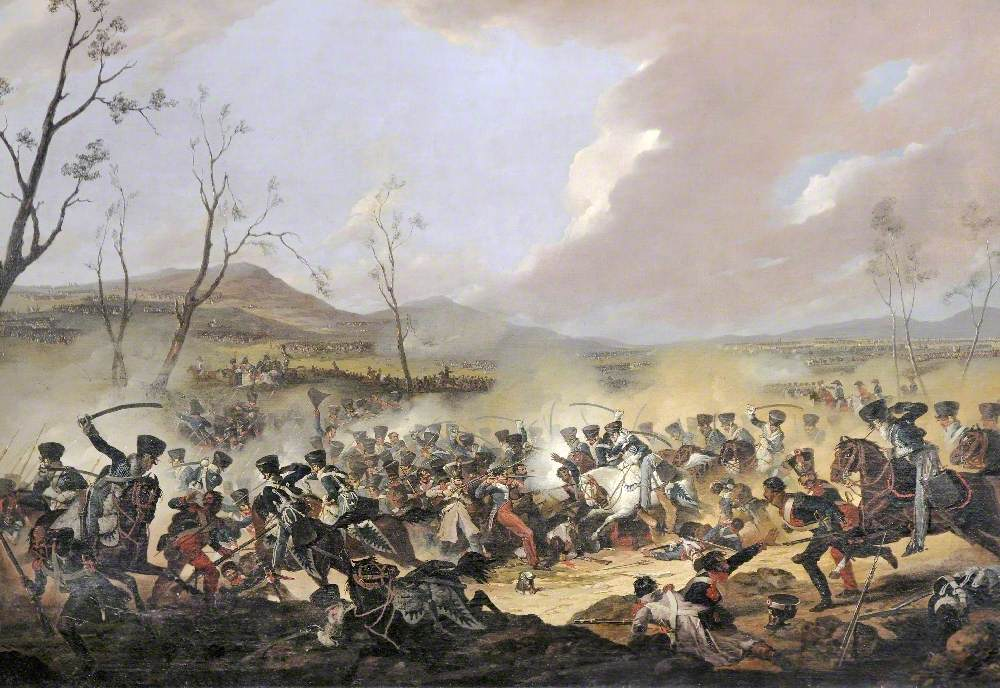
The Final Charge of the British Cavalry at the Battle of Orthez by Denis Dighton

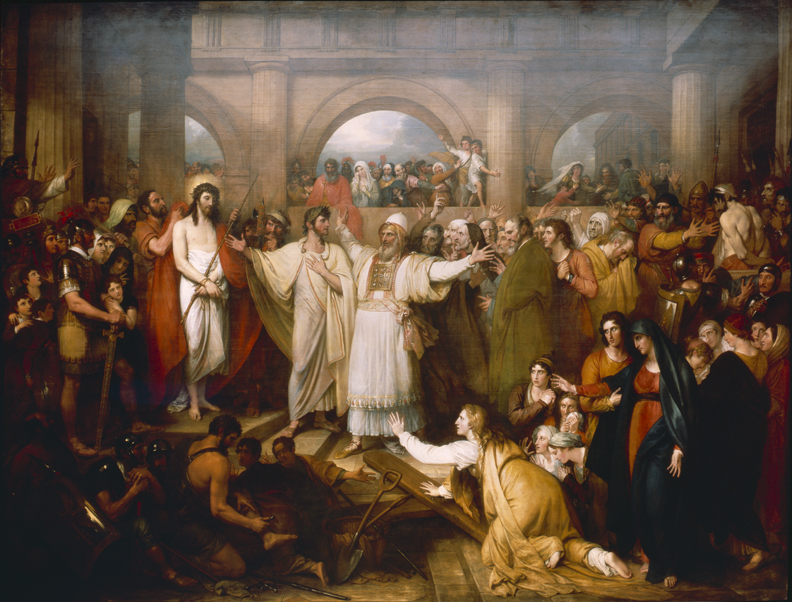
Christ Rejected by Benjamin West

A Cornfield by Peter De Wint

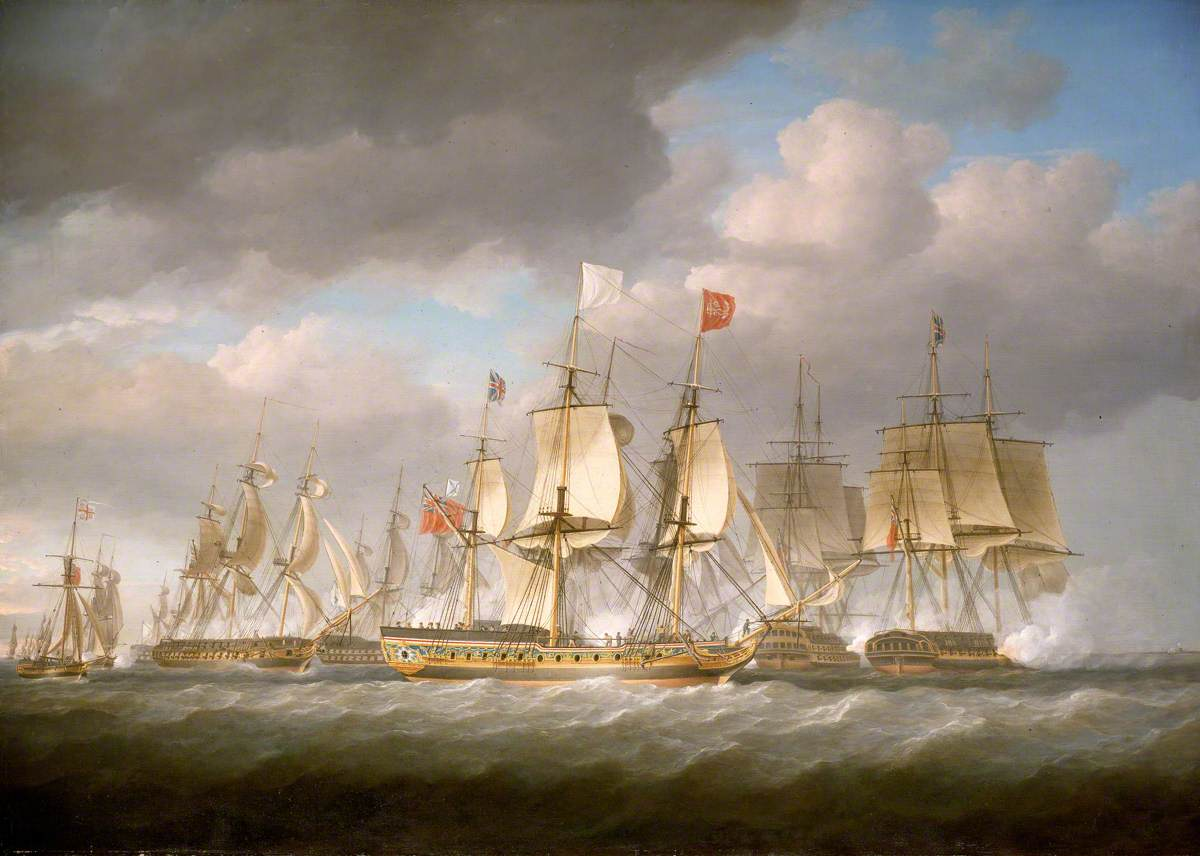
The Royal Sovereign Conveying Louis XVIII to France by Nicholas Pocock

Portrait of the Earl of Kinnoull by Henry Raeburn

Portrait of the Earl of Fife by Henry Raeburn

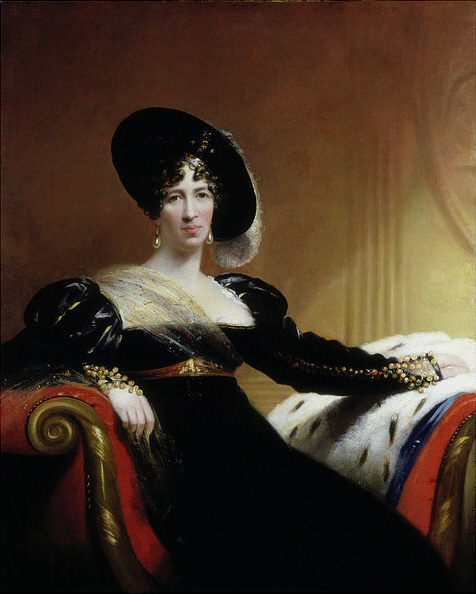
Portrait of Lady Anne Hamilton by James Lonsdale

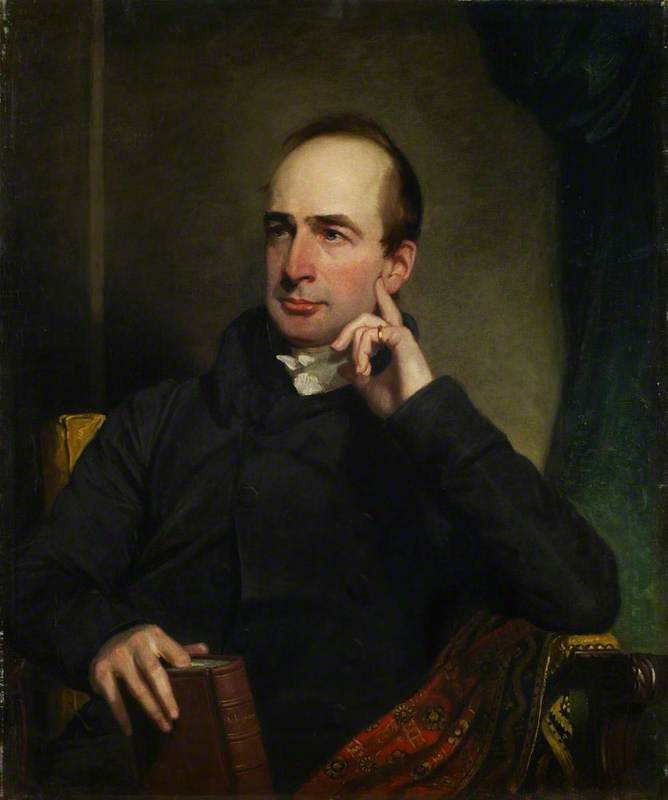
Portrait of Daniel Terry by Henry William Pickersgill

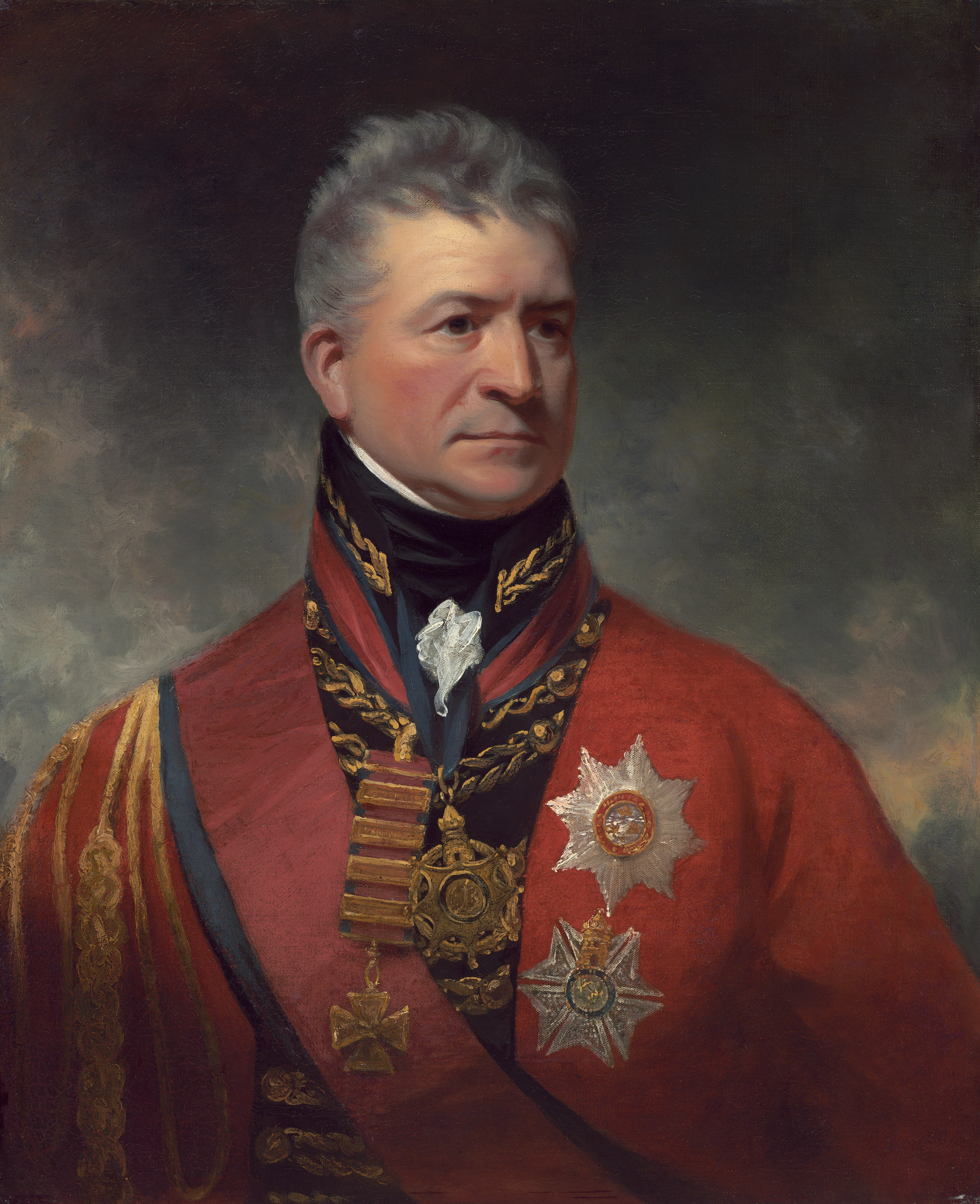
Portrait of Thomas Picton by William Beechey

== Bibliography ==
- Bailey, Anthony. J.M.W. Turner: Standing in the Sun. Tate Enterprises Ltd, 2013.
- Baker, William. Wilkie Collins's Library: A Reconstruction. Bloomsbury Publishing, 2002.
- Hamilton, James. Turner - A Life. Sceptre, 1998.
- Hoock, Holger. Empires of the Imagination: Politics, War, and the Arts in the British World, 1750–1850. Profile Books, 2010.
- Levey, Michael. Sir Thomas Lawrence. Yale University Press, 2005.
- Reynolds, Graham. Constable's England. Metropolitan Museum of Art, 1983.
- Tromans, Nicholas. David Wilkie: The People's Painter. Edinburgh University Press, 2007.
