= Dido building Carthage =

Painting by J. M. W. Turner

Dido Building Carthage
- 'Dido building Carthage, or The Rise of the Carthaginian Empire' (original name)
- Artist: J. M. W. Turner
- Year: 1815
- Type: Oil on canvas, history painting
- Dimensions: 155.5 cm × 260 cm (61 in × 102 in)
- Location: National Gallery, London
- Website: ww.nationalgallery.org.uk/...carthage

Dido building Carthage, or The Rise of the Carthaginian Empire is an 1815 oil on canvas history painting by the English artist J. M. W. Turner. It depicts the construction of Carthage directed by Queen Dido, the legendary founder of that city-state. The painting was exhibited at the Royal Academy Exhibition of 1815 and was inspired by Claude Lorrain's The Embarkation of the Queen of Sheba, painted in 1648.

== Background ==
In 1799, the wealthy art collector John Julius Angerstein invited Turner to see his paintings. (Note: Angerstein's collection was bought by the government after his death in 1824, and led to the founding of the National Gallery in his house at 100 Pall Mall, London.) Standing in front of Claude's The Embarkation of the Queen of Sheba (1648), he burst into tears. When questioned by the disconcerted Angerstain, he passionately explained: “Because I shall never be able to paint anything like that picture.”

For years Turner had wanted to paint a seaport scene that was at the same level as Claude's The Embarkation, and he felt he had finally succeeded with Dido building Carthage. Turner considered it his life's masterwork, calling it his "chef d'oeuvre". He refused to sell it and kept it his whole life.

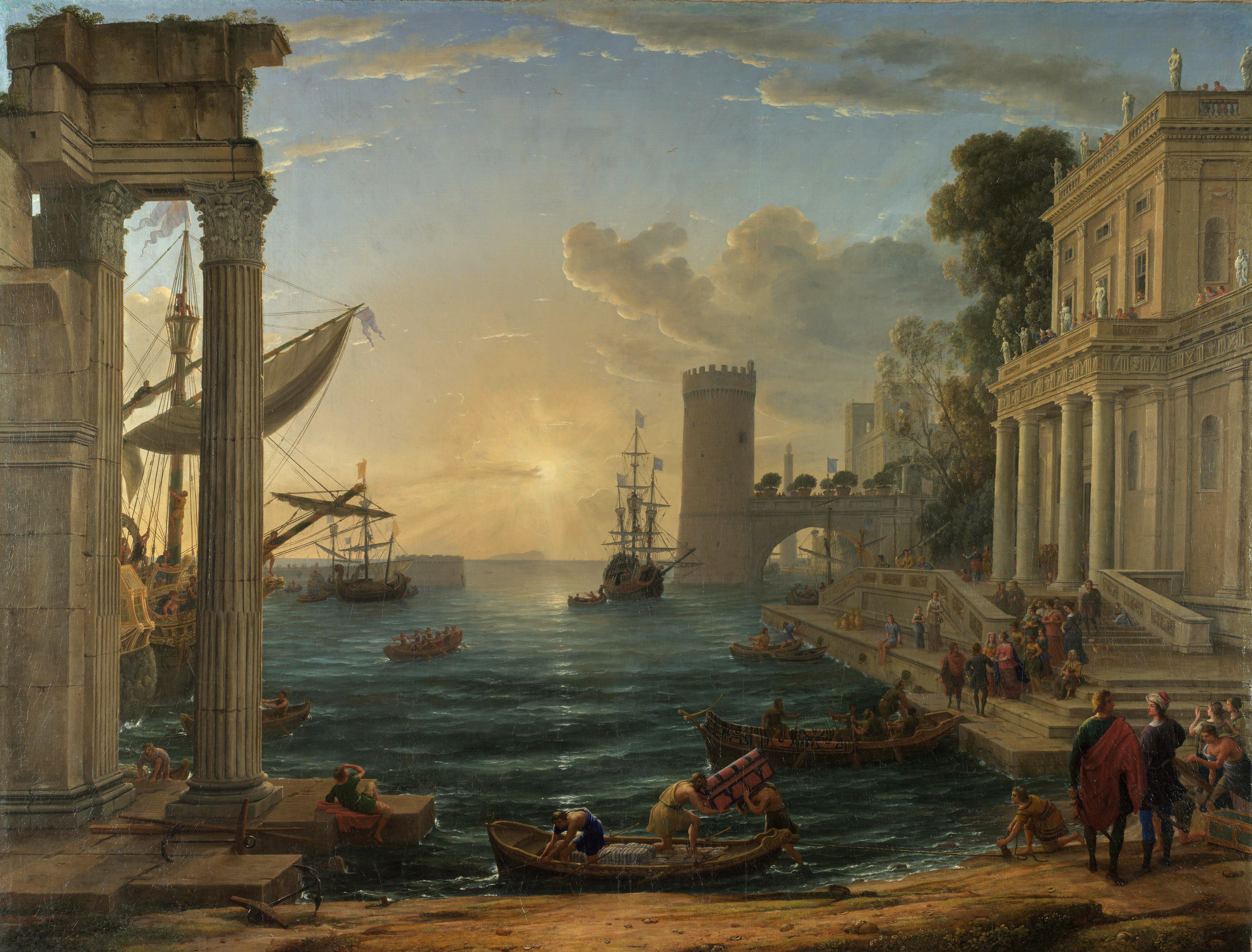
Claude Lorraine, The Embarkation of the Queen of Sheba (1648). National Gallery, London.

Along with Dido building Carthage, he presented at that year's exhibition the pastoral landscape Crossing the Brook; a view of the river Tamar in Devon, also inspired by Claude. Two years later, at the Academy's exhibition of 1817, he exhibited The Decline of the Carthaginian Empire, a companion piece to Dido building Carthage.

Virgil's Aeneid was a life-long source of inspiration for Turner. In addition to Dido building Carthage, he made six other oils based on this classical work. In 1814 he had presented Dido and Aeneas, followed by Lake Avernus: Aeneas and the Cumaean Sibyl (1815), Dido Directing the Equipment of the Fleet (1828), and The Golden Bough (1834). In 1850, the year before his death, he made a set of four paintings relating to Aeneas: Mercury Sent to Admonish Aeneas, The Departure of the Fleet, Aeneas Relating His Story to Dido, and The Visit to the Tomb.

== Description ==
Dido building Carthage presents us with a classical scene inspired by Virgil's Aeneid. The figure in blue and white on the left is Queen Dido, next to architects and masons planning the building of her new city, which arises behind them. The figure in front of her wearing a cloak and a helmet, facing away from the viewer, is most likely the Trojan prince Aeneas, whose extended stay in Carthage occupies a significant portion of the Aeneid.

The painting has many symbolic elements. The tomb of Queen Dido's husband Sychaeus is shown on the right side of the painting. From a dead tree a sapling is growing, a symbol of the city's future expansion after the death of Sychaeus. Under the tomb, the cloaca or sewer, simbolizes the future greatness and longevity of the city. Further off is a group of trees that, as described in Virgil's Aeneid, stood on the middle of the city. Some children are playing with a toy boat in the water, symbolising the future naval dominance of the Mediterranean by the Carthaginians.

A central vanishing point dominates the lower part of the composition. The top half presents us with an intense yellow sunrise, symbolising the dawn of a new empire. The left side of the painting is full of activity, while on the right, everything is still and ominous, increasing the painting's dramatic impact.

== Reception ==
The painting was widely admired when it was first exhibited at the Royal Academy exhibition. Moorby summarizes the artistic accomplishments of Dido building Cathage as follows:

[It shows] a mastery of perspective, [a] superb exploration of light, shade and reflections, [a] moral contrast between life and death (as represented respectively by the teeming city and solemn tomb), and [a] total congruence of time of day, meaning and pictorial structure.

== Bequest ==
Turner never sold the painting. He was so attached to it that in his will of 1829, he stipulated that he should be buried rolled up in this canvas. He later changed his will, (Note: His change of mind was caused by a comment by one of the executors of his will, Francis Chantrey. When Turner asked him if he would respect his wish, Chantrey replied that the stipulation would be respected but added that “as soon as you are buried I will see you taken up and [the canvas] unrolled”. Turner realized that his wish was ridiculous and so amended his will.) deciding instead that it should pass to the National Gallery, on condition that it should be perpetuity displayed next to Claude's Seaport with the Embarkation of the Queen of Sheba.

In the early 20th century, most of Turner's works were moved to the Tate Britain museum, but Dido building Carthage remained at the National Gallery, displayed to this day next to the Claude's painting, as was Turner's wish.

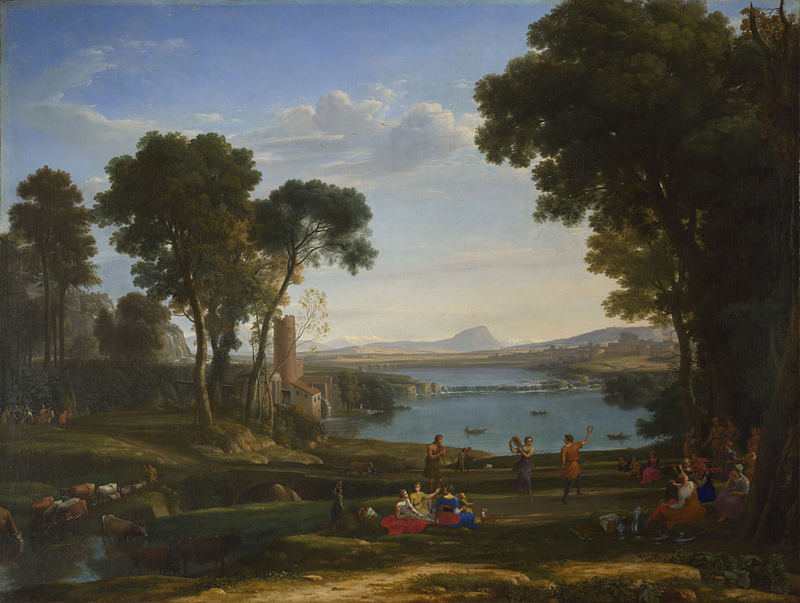
Claude's Landscape with the Marriage of Isaac and Rebecca, 1648

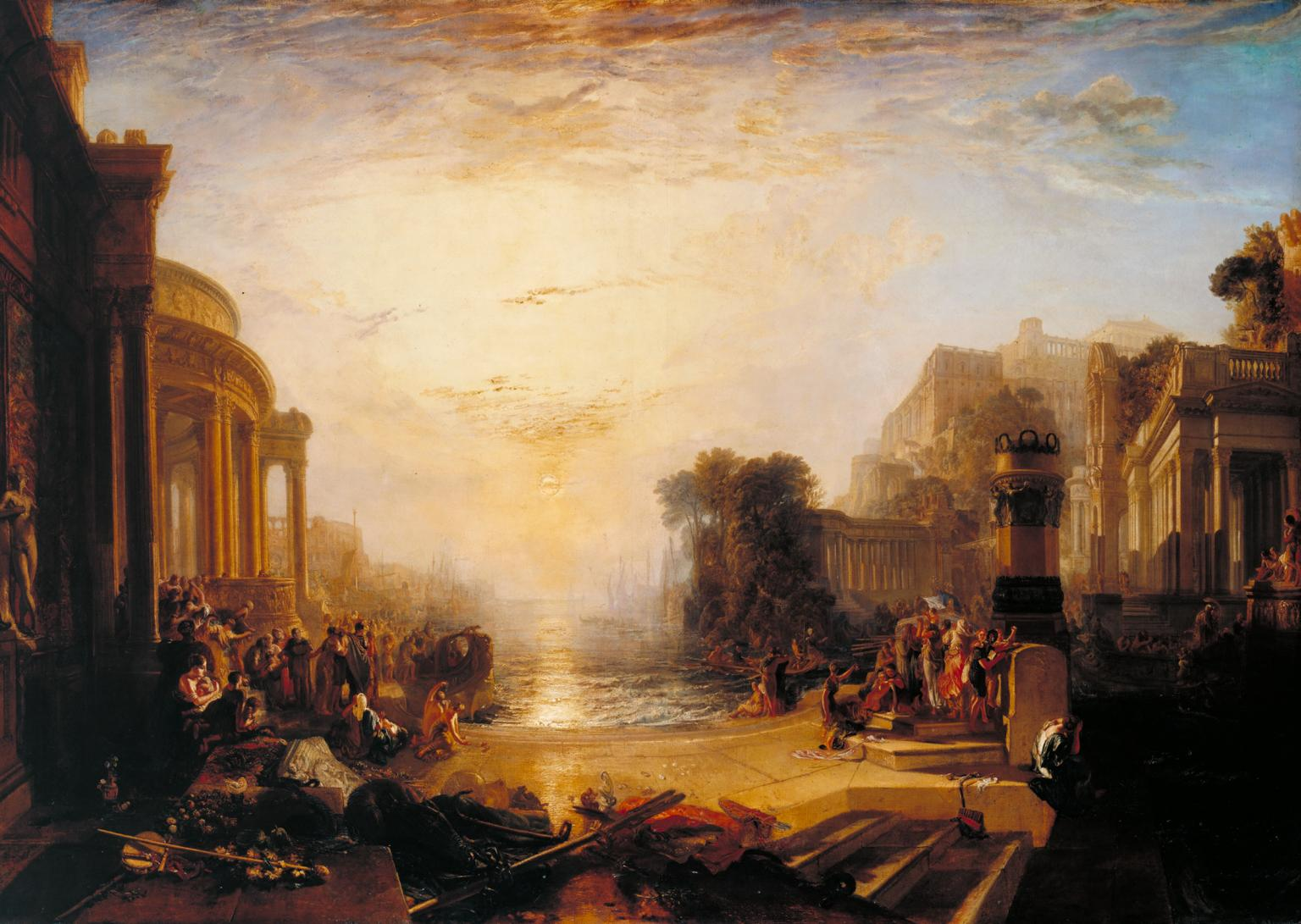
Turner's The Decline of the Carthaginian Empire, 1817

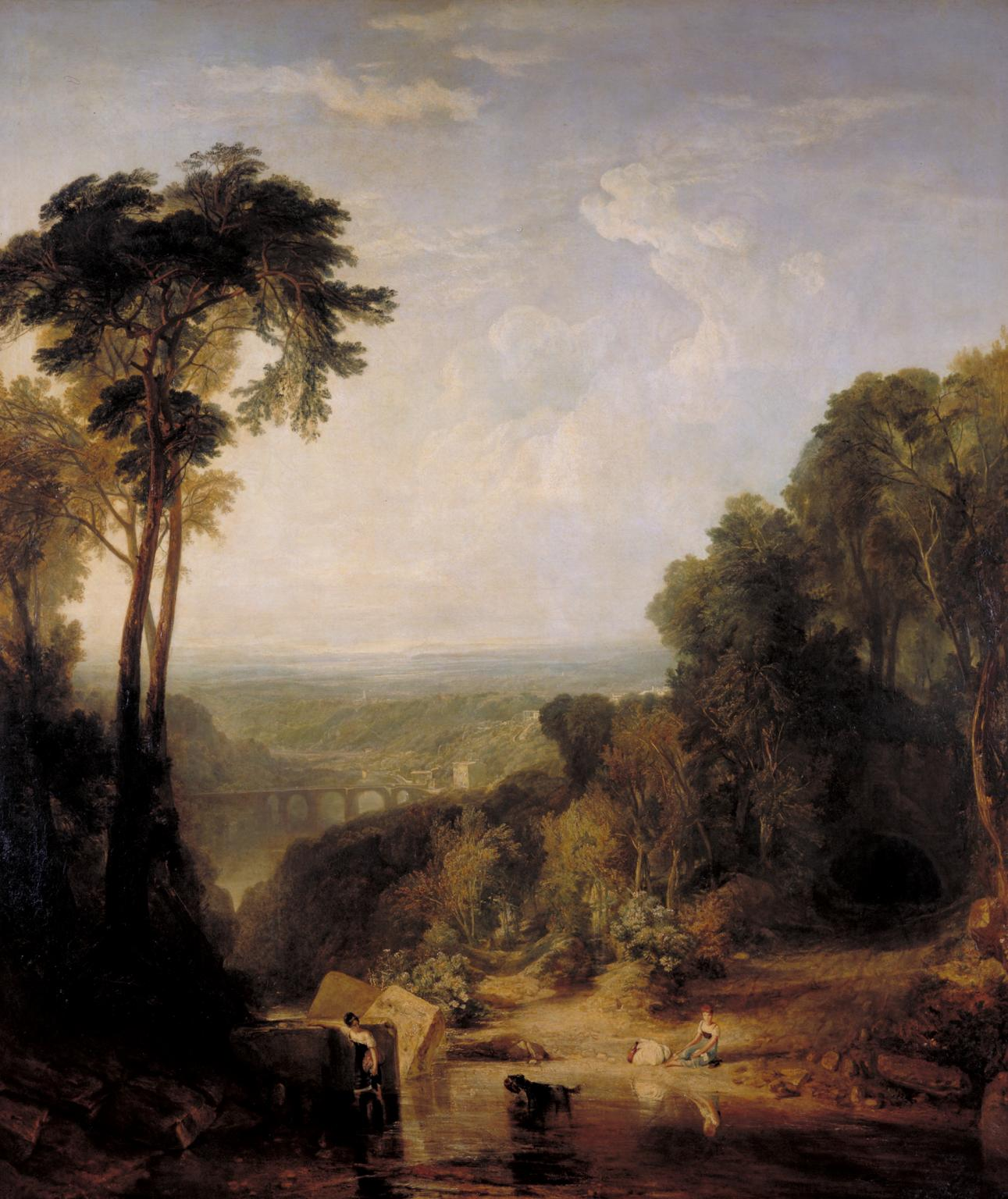
Turner's Crossing the Brook, 1815

== See also ==
- List of paintings by J. M. W. Turner

== Other references ==
- National Gallery
- JMW Turner, the English Claude, The Guardian, 8 March 2012
- J. M. W. Turner: The Making of a Modern Artist, Sam Smiles, pp. 42–44, 126–128
- Academies, Museums, and Canons of Art, Gillian Perry, Colin Cunningham, pp. 183–185
- Angel in the Sun: Turner's Vision of History, Gerald E. Finley, pp. 63–67
- Cultivating Picturacy: Visual Art And Verbal Interventions, James A. W. Heffernan, pp. 129–131
- Turner biography, Turner Society
