= Distraining for Rent =

Painting by David Wilkie

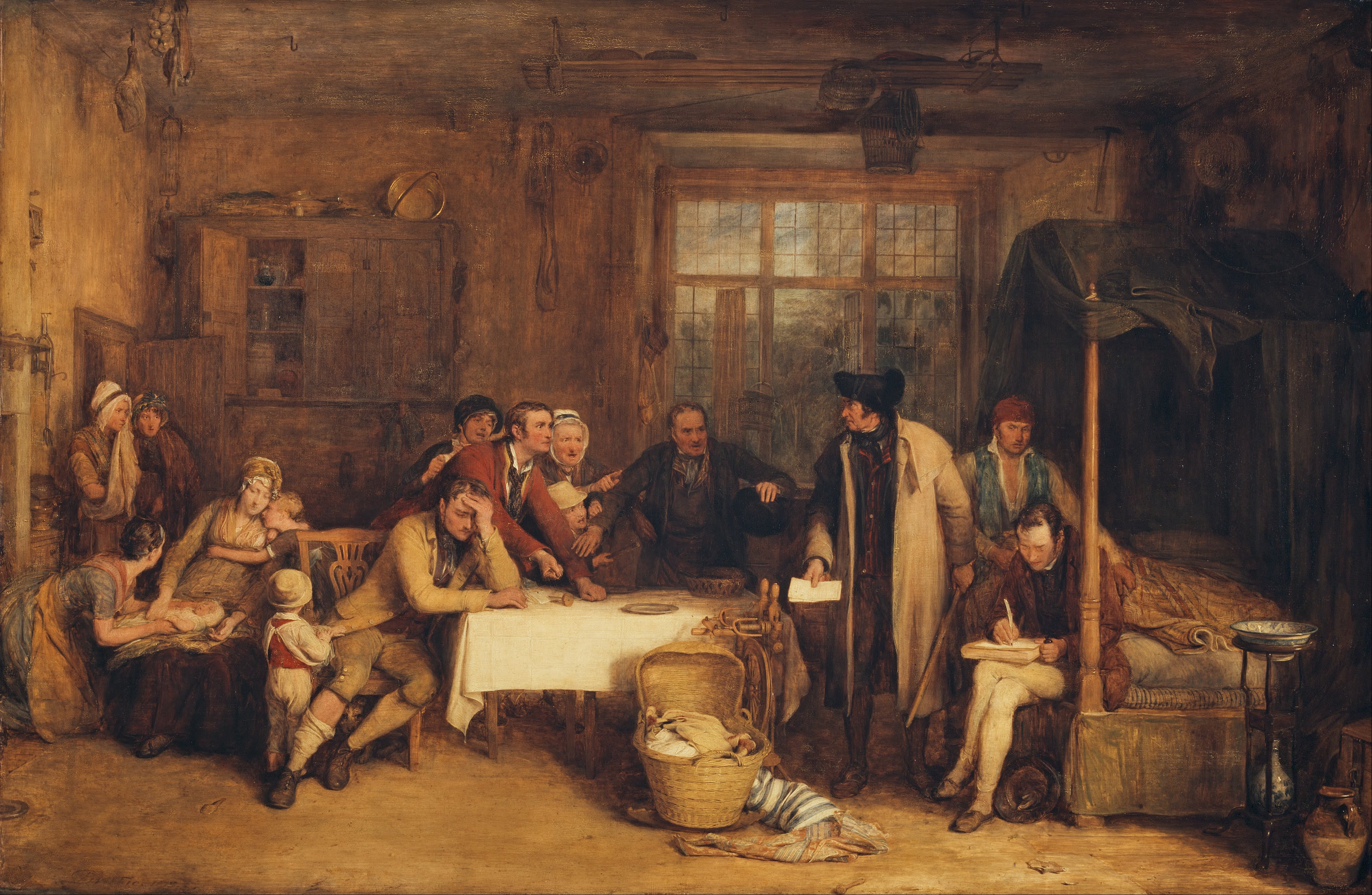
- Artist: David Wilkie
- Year: 1815
- Type: Oil on panel, genre painting
- Dimensions: 81.3 cm × 123 cm (32.0 in × 48 in)
- Location: Scottish National Gallery, Edinburgh

Distraining for Rent is an 1815 genre painting by the British artist David Wilkie. It shows a tenant farmer and his family facing eviction having fallen behind in their rent payments. It features the process of distraint from which it takes its title as goods are seized by bailiffs. Wilkie had risen to notice at the Royal Academy with his genre paintings that paid strong reference to those of the seventeenth century.

The painting was displayed at the Royal Academy Exhibition of 1815 at Somerset House. and was purchased by the directors of the British Institution the same year. It is in the collection of the Scottish National Gallery in Edinburgh, having been purchased in 1975.

== Bibliography ==
- Morrison, John. Painting Labour in Scotland and Europe, 1850-1900. Taylor and Francisz 2017.
- Tromans, Nicholas. David Wilkie: The People's Painter. Edinburgh University Press, 2007.
- Wright, Christopher, Gordon, Catherine May & Smith, Mary Peskett. British and Irish Paintings in Public Collections: An Index of British and Irish Oil Paintings by Artists Born Before 1870 in Public and Institutional Collections in the United Kingdom and Ireland.
