= The Embarkation of the Queen of Sheba =

Painting by Claude Lorrain

Seaport with the Embarkation of the Queen of Sheba
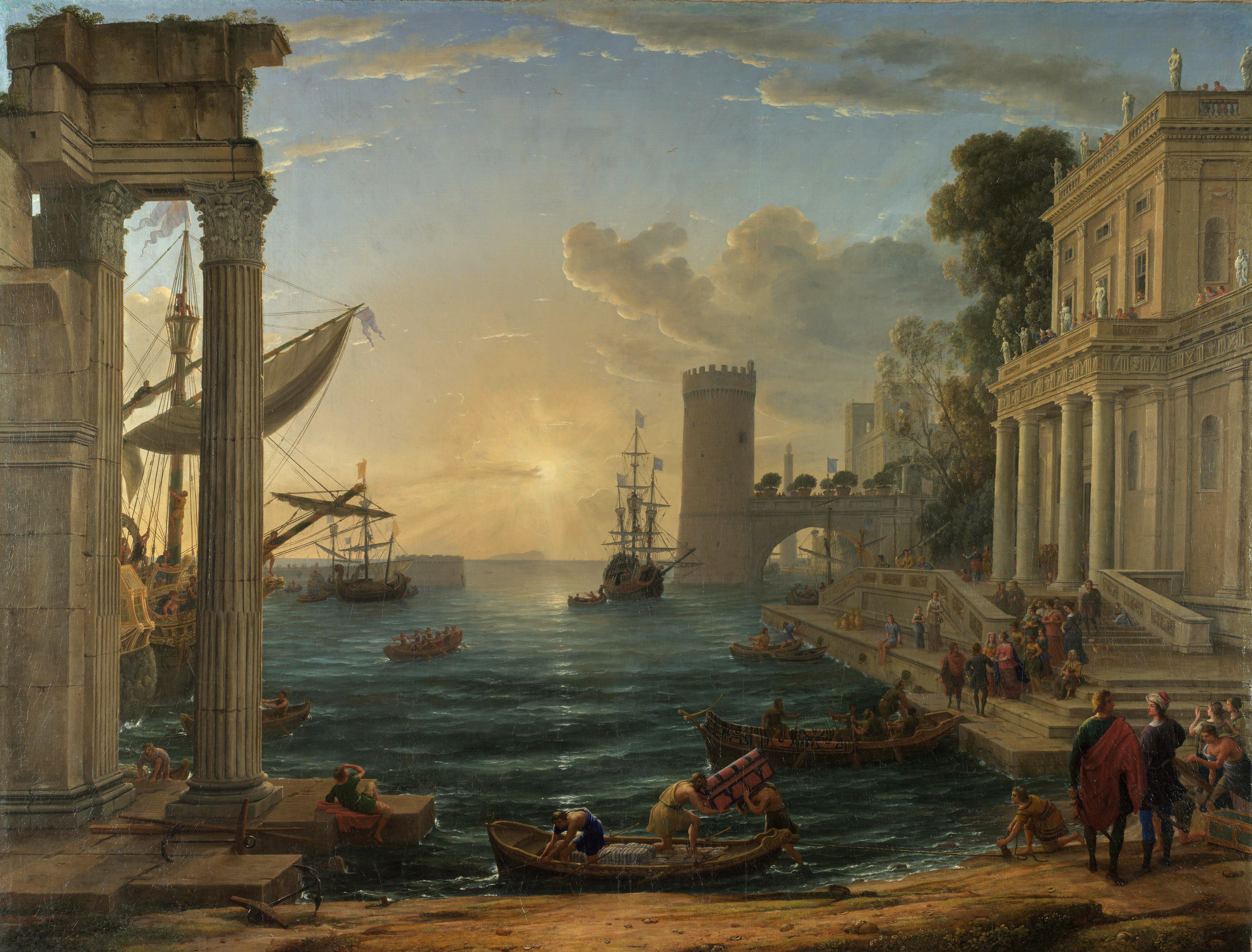
- Artist: Claude Lorrain
- Year: 1648
- Medium: Oil on canvas
- Dimensions: 149.1 cm × 196.7 cm (58.7 in × 77.4 in)
- Location: National Gallery; London

Seaport with the Embarkation of the Queen of Sheba is an oil painting by Claude Lorrain (born Claude Gellée, traditionally known as Claude), in the National Gallery, London, signed and dated 1648. The large oil-on-canvas painting was commissioned by Frédéric Maurice de La Tour d'Auvergne, Duc de Bouillon, general of the Papal army, together with Claude's Landscape with the Marriage of Isaac and Rebecca, also now in the National Gallery. It depicts the departure of the Queen of Sheba to visit King Solomon in Jerusalem, described in the tenth chapter of the First Book of Kings. A more usual subject would be their meeting; this is one of many harbour scenes painted by Claude. The Queen is departing from a city with classical buildings, with the early morning Sun lighting the sea, as vessels are loaded.

The composition draws the eye to a group of people on the steps to the right, at the intersection of a line of perspective (the steps) and a strong vertical (the left column of the building's portico). The Queen wears a pink tunic, royal blue cloak, and golden crown, and is about to board a waiting launch to take her to her ship – perhaps the ship partially concealed by the pillars to the left, or the one further out to sea, over the picture's vanishing point.

The painting was one of the first works to be acquired by the National Gallery in 1824, being one of five works by Claude Lorrain bought from the collection of John Julius Angerstein. It has the catalogue number NG14. This and similar works by Claude inspired J. M. W. Turner to paint Dido Building Carthage and The Decline of the Carthaginian Empire, which Turner left to the nation as part of the Turner Bequest on the condition that they were to be hung besides Claude's pair of works.

It is numbered 114 in Claude's Liber Veritatis.

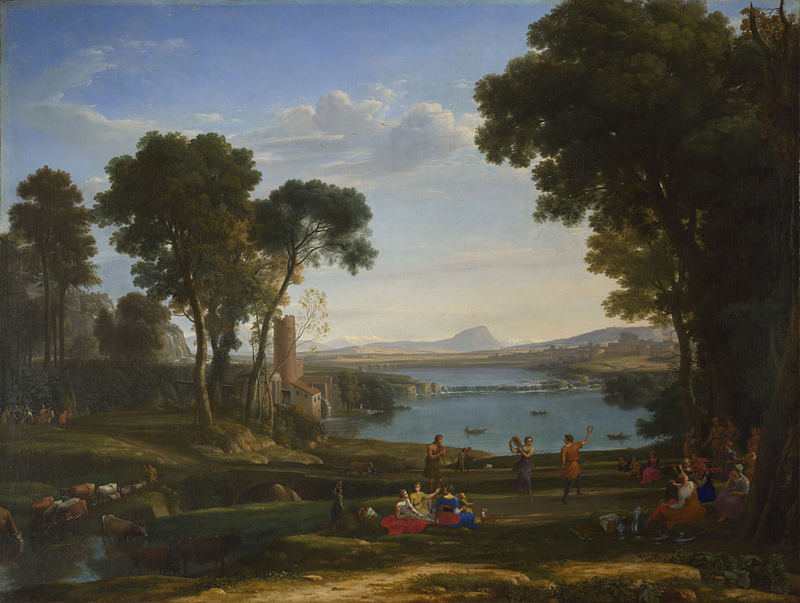
Claude's Landscape with the Marriage of Isaac and Rebecca, National Gallery

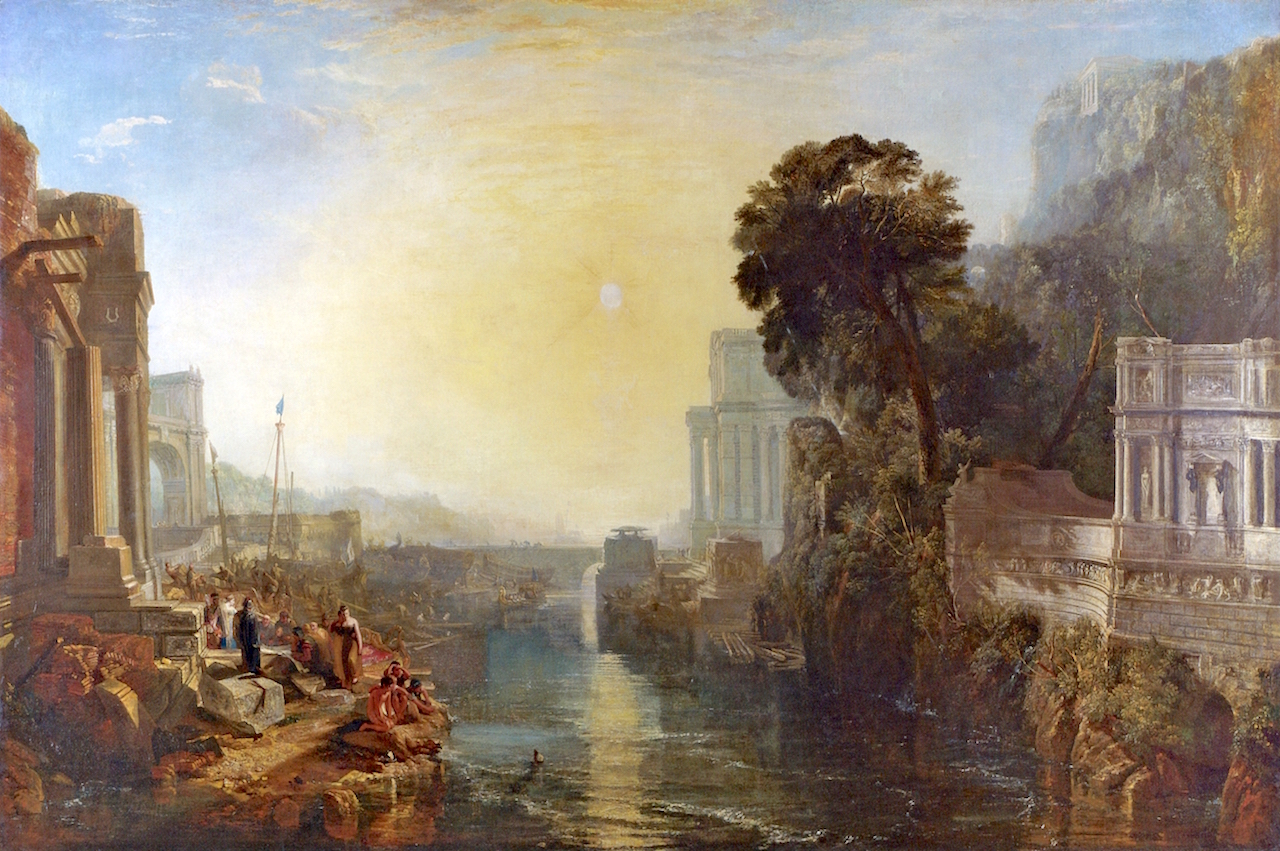
Turner's Dido Building Carthage

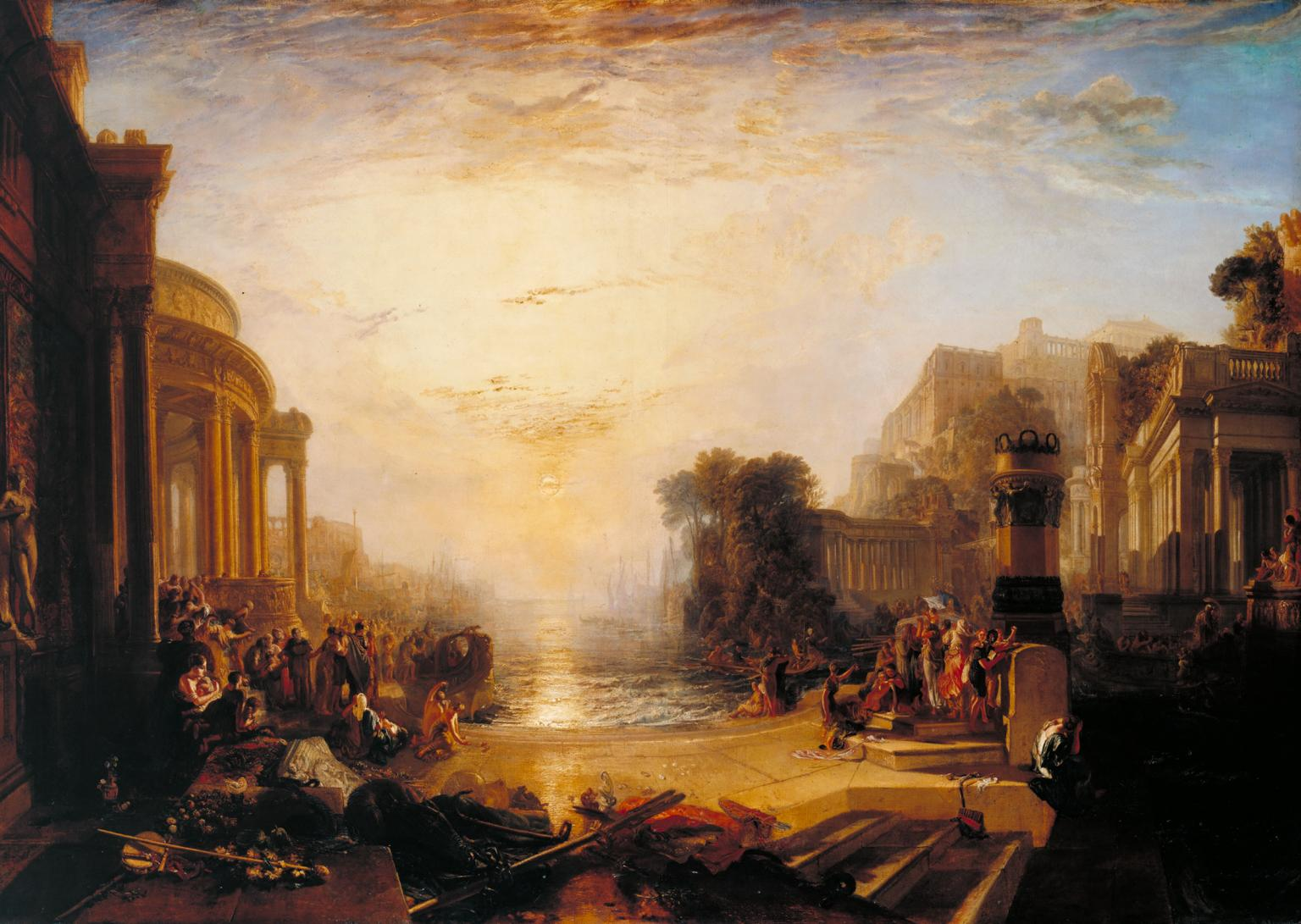
Turner's The Decline of the Carthaginian Empire
