= Crossing the Brook =

Painting by J. M. W. Turner

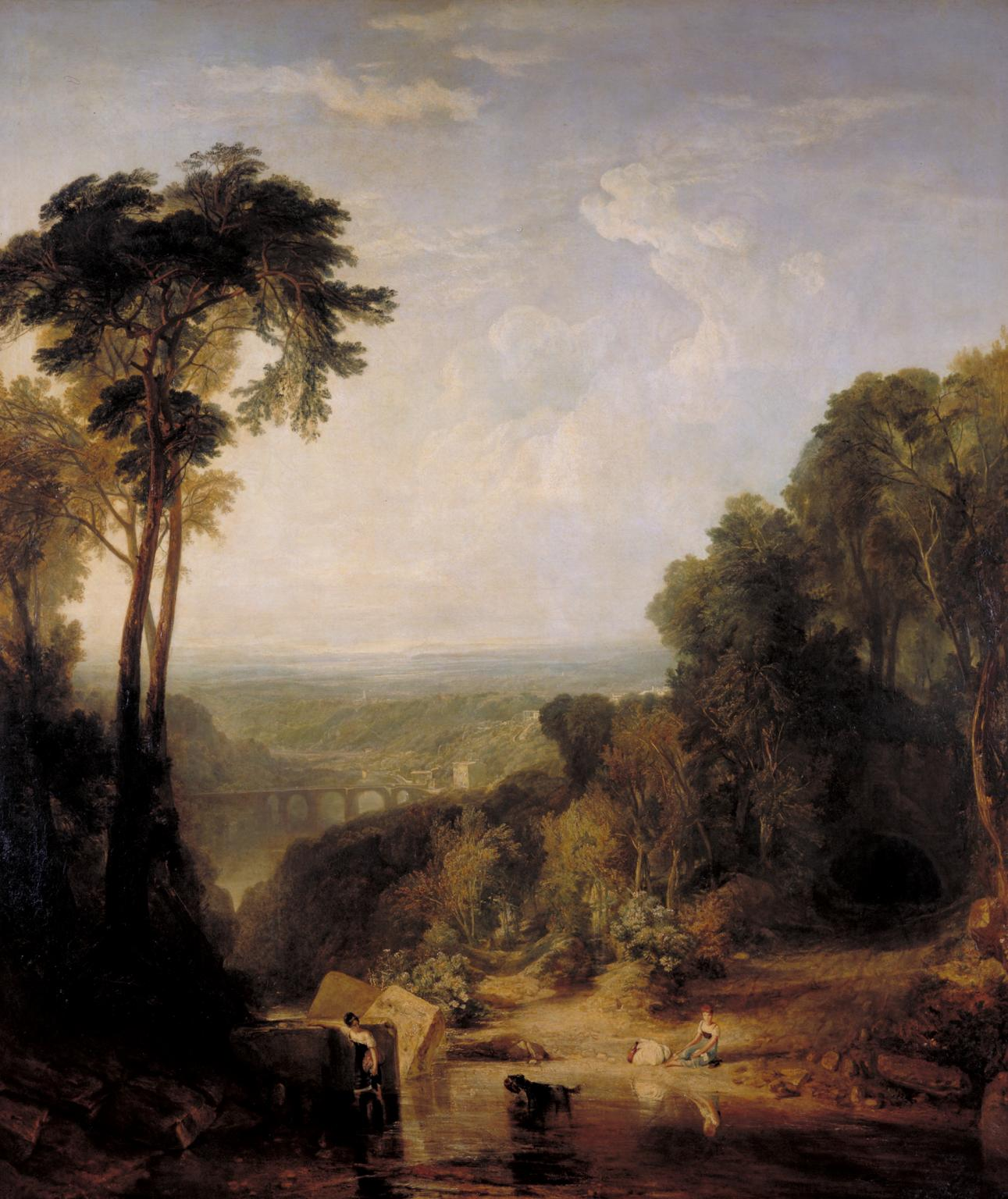
- Artist: J. M. W. Turner
- Year: 1815
- Type: Oil on canvas, landscape painting
- Dimensions: 193 cm × 165 cm (76 in × 65 in)
- Location: Tate Britain, London
- Website: www.tate.org.uk/...n00497

Crossing the Brook is an 1815 landscape painting by the British artist J.M.W. Turner. It depicts a view towards Plymouth down the Tamar valley. Turner gave the English countryside an Italianate look. He produced it based on sketches he had made during a trip to Devon in 1813.

It was displayed at the Royal Academy Exhibition of 1815 at Somerset House along with Dido building Carthage. Today it is in the collection of the Tate Britain having been part of the Turner Bequest of 1856.

== See also ==
- List of paintings by J. M. W. Turner

== Bibliography ==
- Bailey, Anthony. J.M.W. Turner: Standing in the Sun. Tate Enterprises Ltd, 2013.
- Hamilton, James. Turner - A Life. Sceptre, 1998.
- Noon, Patrick & Bann, Stephen. Constable to Delacroix: British Art and the French Romantics. Tate, 2003.
- Peckham, Morse. The Birth of Romanticism, 1790-1815. Penkevill, 1986.
