= Fishing Upon the Blythe Sand =

Painting by J. M. W. Turner

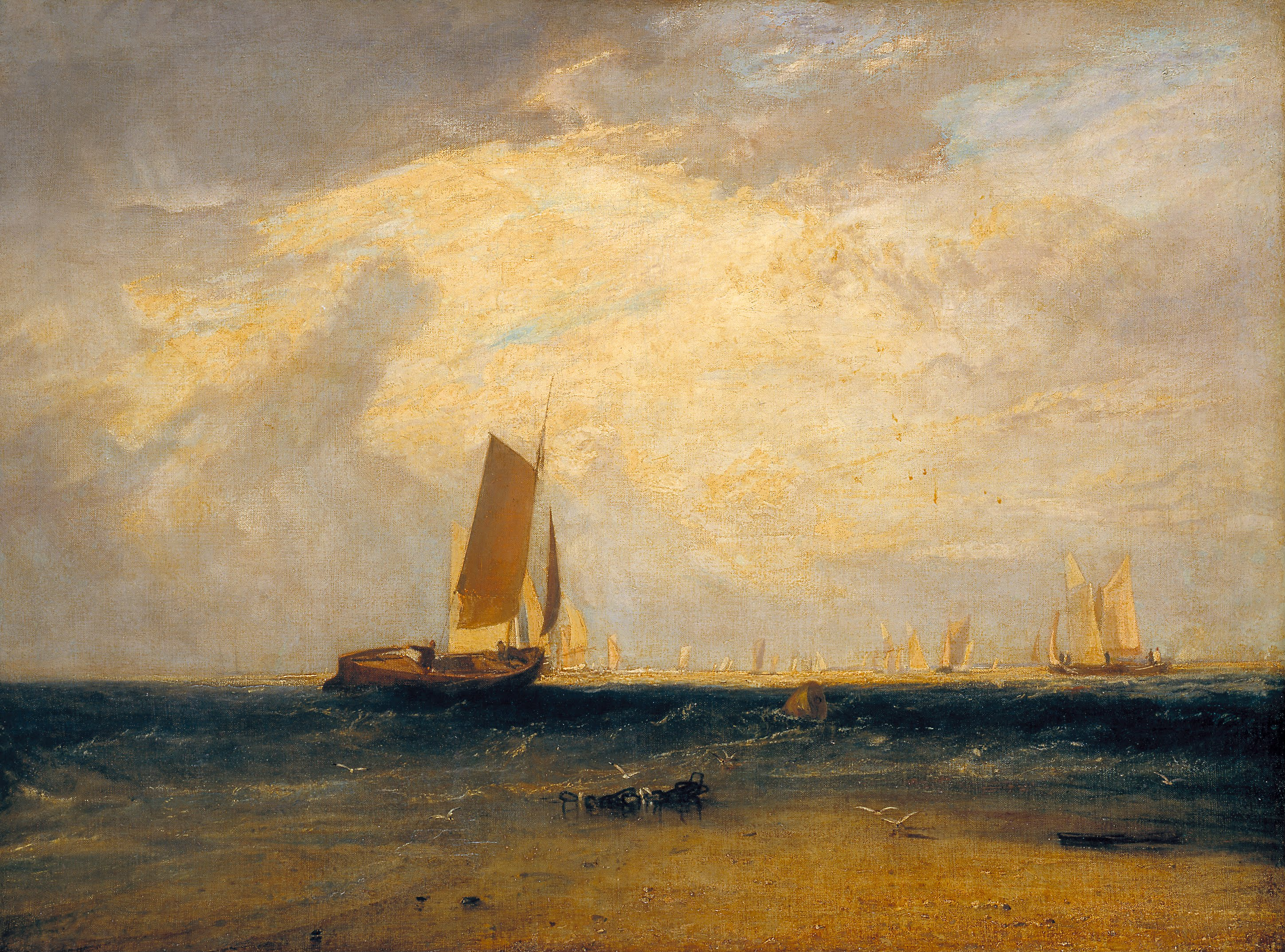
- Artist: J. M. W. Turner
- Year: 1809
- Type: Oil on canvas, landscape painting
- Dimensions: 88.9 cm × 119.4 cm (35.0 in × 47.0 in)
- Location: Tate Britain, London
- Website: www.tate.org.uk/...n00496

Fishing Upon the Blythe Sand is an 1809 landscape painting by the British artist J.M.W. Turner. It depicts the Blythe Sands in the Thames Estuary near Sheerness. The focus is on the dark sails of the ship in the foreground, silhouetted against the lighter craft in the background.

Turner put the painting on display at his studio gallery in Marylebone, but it was not sold. Reportedly Turner rejected an offer to purchase it from the art collector Sir George Beaumont who has been critical of his paintings. It was then displayed at the Royal Academy Exhibition of 1815 at Somerset House. Turner grew particularly fond of the painting and kept it in his own collection. After his death it formed part of the Turner Bequest to the nation. Today it is in the collection of the Tate Britain in Pimlico.

== See also ==
- List of paintings by J. M. W. Turner

== Bibliography ==
- Bailey, Anthony. J.M.W. Turner: Standing in the Sun. Tate Enterprises, 2013.
- Cordingly, David. Marine Painting in England, 1700-1900. Studio Vista, 1974.
- Solkin, David. Turner and the Masters. Tate Britain, 2009.
- Spencer-Longhurst, Paul. The Sun Rising Through Vapour: Turner's Early Seascapes. Third Millennium Information, 2003.
