= Portrait of the Duke of Wellington (Waterloo Chamber) =

1815 painting by Thomas Lawrence

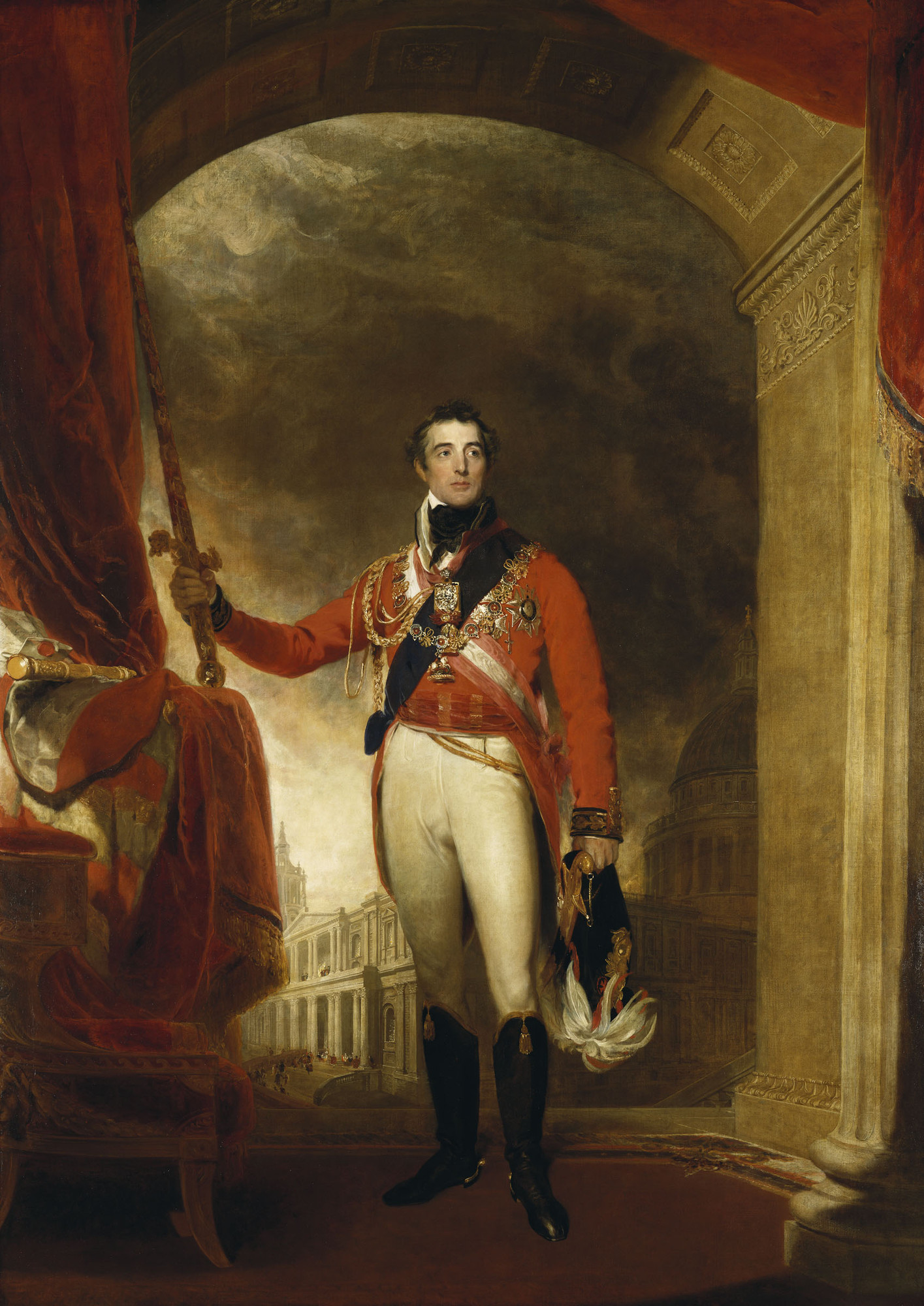
- Artist: Thomas Lawrence
- Year: 1815
- Type: Oil on canvas, portrait painting
- Dimensions: 317.1 cm × 225.6 cm (124.8 in × 88.8 in)
- Location: Royal Collection, Windsor Castle

Portrait of the Duke of Wellington is an oil on canvas portrait painting by the English artist Thomas Lawrence depicting the Anglo-Irish general and politician the Duke of Wellington. It was created in 1815. The work was commissioned for a fee of five hundred guineas by the Prince Regent who became a major patron of Lawrence during the Regency era. It was produced following the initial Allied victory in the Napoleonic Wars in 1814.

== History and description ==
The painting was displayed at the Royal Academy Exhibition of 1815 at Somerset House in London. While the exhibition was taking place Wellington and his Prussian allies won a decisive victory over Napoleon who had escaped from Elba to take place in a final campaign that ended at the Battle of Waterloo.

Wellington is shown at full-length under a triumphal Roman arch and holding the sword of state. He is dressed in the uniform of a Field Marshal of the British Army. In the background is a thanksgiving victory procession heading towards St Paul's Cathedral. The painting remains in the Royal Collection and is located in the Waterloo Chamber at Windsor Castle which celebrates members of the European coalition involved in the defeat of Napoleon.

== See also ==
- Portrait of the Duke of Wellington, an 1815 work by Lawrence now at Apsley House in London

== Bibliography ==
- Goldring, Douglas. Regency Portrait Painter: The Life of Sir Thomas Lawrence. ISBN 1014181941. Macdonald, 1951.
- Levey, Michael. Sir Thomas Lawrence. ISBN 0300109989. Yale University Press, 2005.
