= View of Southampton Water, Passage and Luggage Boats =

Painting by Augustus Wall Callcott

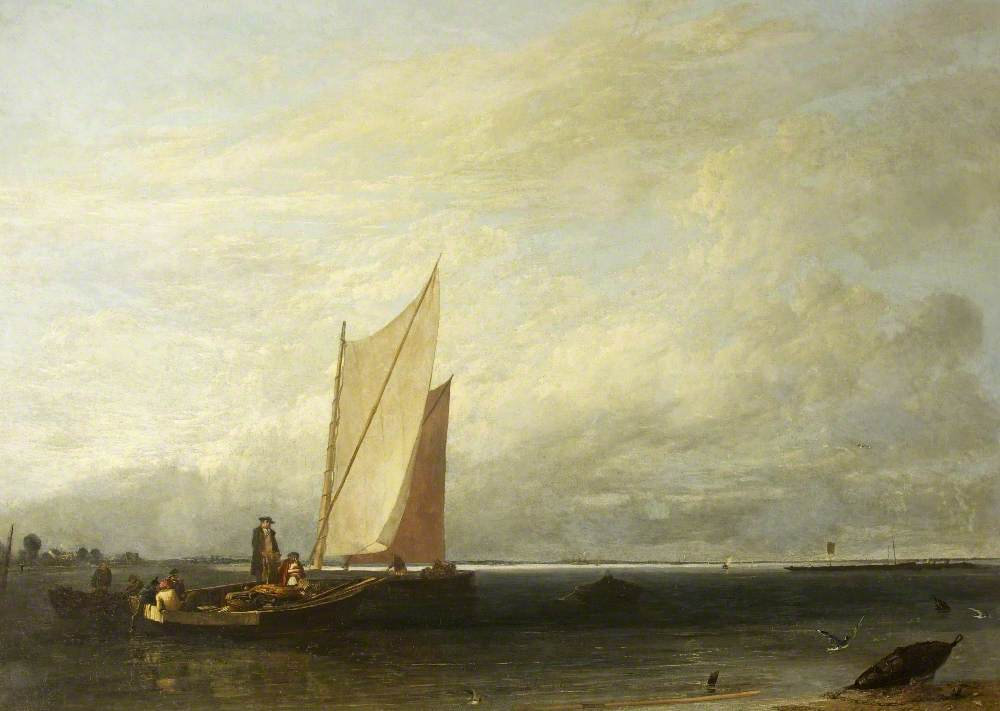
- Artist: Augustus Wall Callcott
- Year: 1815
- Type: Oil on canvas
- Dimensions: 156 cm × 219 cm (61 in × 86 in)
- Location: Tyntesfield, Somerset

View of Southampton Water, Passage and Luggage Boats is an oil painting on canvas by the British landscape artist Augustus Wall Callcott, from 1815. A seascape, it features a view of Southampton Water in Hampshire.

Wall Callcott was known for his landscapes produced during the Romantic era and his work often drew comparisons to his friend and rival J.M.W. Turner. He was a long-standing member of the Royal Academy of Arts and was knighted by Queen Victoria in 1837.

The painting was displayed at the Royal Academy Exhibition of 1815 at Somerset House in London. Originally commissioned by Sir John Swinburne, it was pitched in 1861 by William Gibbs. It was acquired by the National Trust in 2002 and continues to form part of the collection at Tyntesfield in Somerset.

== Bibliography ==
- Brown, David Blayney. Augustus Wall Callcott. Tate Gallery, 1981.
- Bryant, Julius. Kenwood, Paintings in the Iveagh Bequest. Yale University Press, 2003.
- Miller, James. 'Fertile Fortune: The Story of Tyntesfield. Pavilion Books, 2006.
