= Boat-Building Near Flatford Mill =

Painting by John Constable

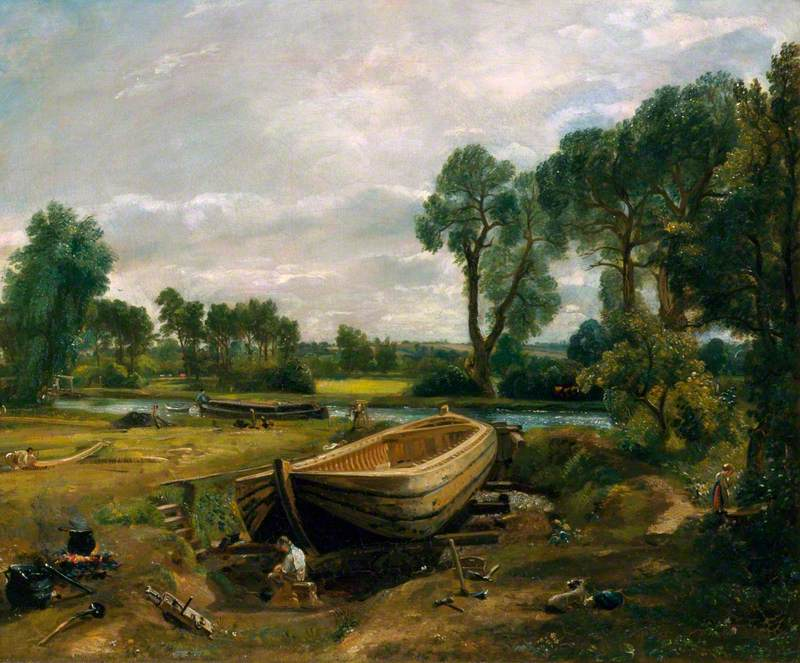
- Artist: John Constable
- Year: 1815
- Type: Oil on canvas, landscape painting
- Dimensions: 50.8 cm × 61.6 cm (20.0 in × 24.3 in)
- Location: Victoria and Albert Museum, London

Boat-Building Near Flatford Mill is an 1815 landscape painting by the English artist John Constable. It depicts a scene on the River Stour near to Flatford Mill on the Essex-Suffolk border. Constable's father owned Flatford Mill and the area around it is now known as Constable Country. Portraying the process of boat building, it has been described as a forerunner of his best-known Six-Foot paintings depicting scenes from the area.

The painting was one of five Constable displayed at the Royal Academy Exhibition of 1815 at Somerset House. It formed part of the Sheepshanks Gift of 1857 and is today in the collection of the Victoria and Albert Museum in London.

== See also ==
- List of paintings by John Constable

== Bibliography ==
- Allhusen, Edward. John Constable. Medici Society, 2009
- Bailey, Anthony. John Constable: A Kingdom of his Own. Random House, 2012.
- Charles, Victoria. Constable. Parkstone International, 2015.
- Hamilton, James. Constable: A Portrait. Hachette UK, 2022.
- Reynolds, Graham. Constable's England. Metropolitan Museum of Art, 1983.
- Thornes, John E. John Constable's Skies: A Fusion of Art and Science. A&C Black, 1999.
- Waites, Ian. Common Land in English Painting, 1700-1850. Boydell Press, 2012.
