= Portrait of Count Münster =

1815 painting by Thomas Lawrence

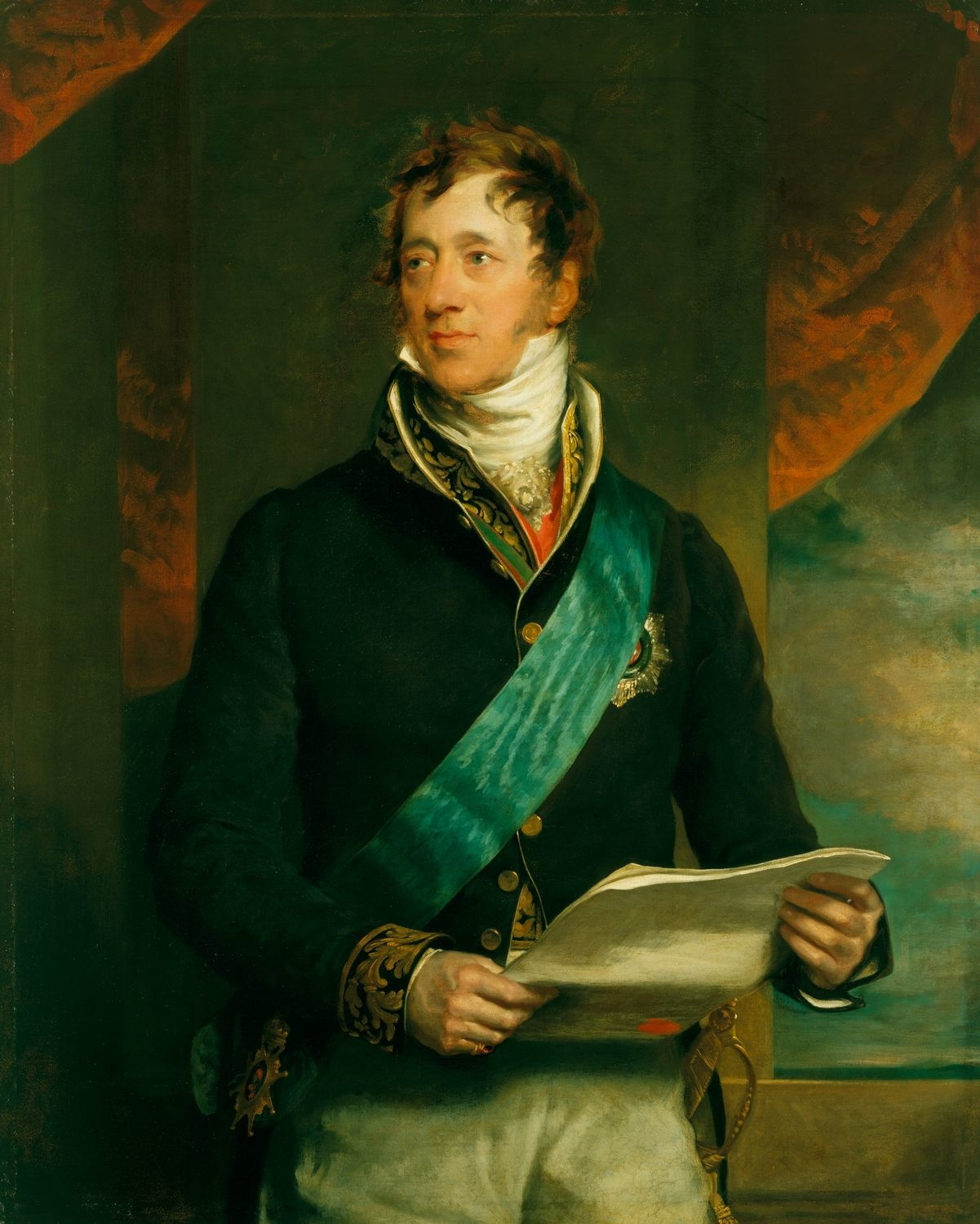
- Artist: Thomas Lawrence
- Year: 1815
- Type: Oil on canvas, portrait painting
- Dimensions: 133.5 cm × 107 cm (52.6 in × 42 in)
- Location: Royal Collection, Windsor Castle

Portrait of Count Münster is an 1815 portrait painting by the English artist Thomas Lawrence. It depicts the German statesman and diplomat Count Münster. He is shown in his court dress as a Hanoverian representative, wearing the Royal Guelphic Order.

Since the Hanoverian Succession of 1714 Britain and Hanover had been united in a personal union After a decade of a French occupation following the invasion of 1803, Hanover was liberated by Allied forces in 1813. Münster was the Hanoverian representative at the Congress of Vienna, at which it was elevated from an Electorate to the Kingdom of Hanover, working alongside but distinct from the British representatives Lord Castlereagh and the Duke of Wellington.

Lawrence was a prominent member of the Royal Academy and the most successful portraitist of the Regency era. Münster may have first sat to him around the time of the Allied Sovereigns's Visit to England in 1814. The painting was displayed at the Royal Academy Exhibition of 1815 at Somerset House in London. It formed part of a large scale commission from Prince Regent to paint Allied leaders involved in the coalition that defeated Napoleon. He was paid 300 guineas for the work. He then reworked it during sittings at the Congress of Aix-la-Chapelle in 1818 and in Vienna the following year. It then remained at his Russell Square studio until his death in 1830. His assistant Richard Evans prepared It for display. It now hangs in the Waterloo Chamber of Windsor Castle.

== Bibliography ==
- Armstrong, Walter. Lawrence. Methuen, 1913.
- Goldring, Douglas. Regency Portrait Painter: The Life of Sir Thomas Lawrence. Macdonald, 1951.
- Levey, Michael. Sir Thomas Lawrence. Yale University Press, 2005.
- Millar, Oliver. The Later Georgian Pictures in the Collection of Her Majesty the Queen. Phaidon, 1969
- Robinson, John Martin. Windsor Castle: Official Guidebook. Royal Collection, 2006.
- Simms, Brendan & Riotte, Torsten. The Hanoverian Dimension in British History, 1714–1837. Cambridge University Press, 2007.
