= The Departure to London =

Painting by Edward Bird

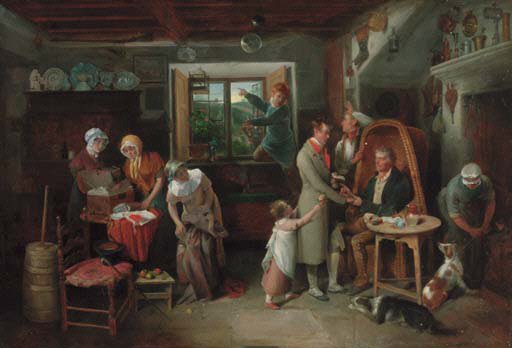
- Artist: Edward Bird
- Year: 1815
- Type: Oil on panel, genre painting
- Dimensions: 60.9 cm × 91.4 cm (24.0 in × 36.0 in)
- Location: City Museum and Art Gallery, Bristol

The Departure to London is an oil on panel genre painting by the English artist Edward Bird, from 1815. It is held at the Bristol City Museum and Art Gallery.

== History and description ==
It shows a young man taking leave of his family before travelling to London to try and make his fortune. By the window a young boy eaglerly points at the arriving stage coach. Bird was a member of the Bristol School and was known for genre works of everyday life in Regency England. The painting was displayed at the Royal Academy Exhibition of 1815 at Somerset House. It was praised by The New Monthly Magazine as "a happy expression of affectionate sentiment".

It was auctioned at Christie's in 2000.

== Bibliography ==
- Greenacre, Francis. The Bristol School of Artists: Francis Danby and Painting in Bristol, 1810-1840. City Art Gallery, 1973.
- Richardson, Sarah. Edward Bird, 1772-1819. Wolverhampton Art Gallery, 1982.
