= Portrait of Prince Metternich =

1815 painting by Thomas Lawrence

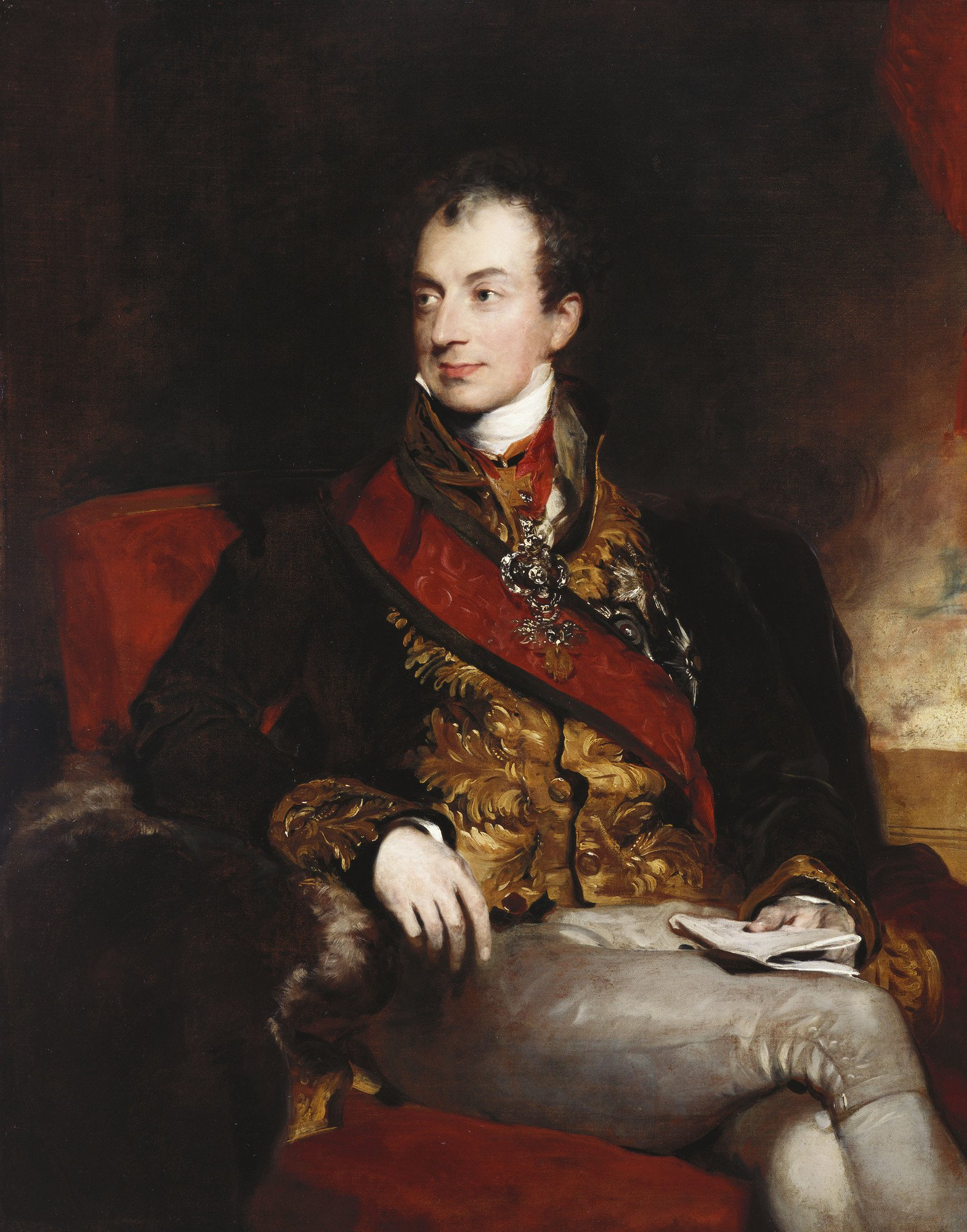
- Artist: Thomas Lawrence
- Year: 1815
- Type: Oil on canvas, portrait
- Dimensions: 131.2 cm × 105 cm (51.7 in × 41 in)
- Location: Royal Collection, Windsor Castle

The Portrait of Prince Metternich is an oil on canvas painting by the British artist Thomas Lawrence of the Austrian statesman Klemens von Metternich. It was created in 1815. Lawrence painted many European leaders involved in the alliance against Napoleon's French Empire.

== History and description ==
A Rhinelander by birth, Metternich was appointed Foreign Minister of the Austrian Empire in 1809. He played a key role in the Sixth Coalition that defeated Napoleon in 1814 and the subsequent Congress of Vienna. Metternich wears court dress and the decorations of the Order of the Golden Fleece and the Order of Saint Stephen. It was exhibited at the Royal Academy's Summer Exhibition in 1815. Lawrence apparently reworked the painting, partly at a subsequent sitting during the Congress of Aix-la-Chapelle in 1818, and exhibited a completed version in 1819. Now part of the Royal Collection the painting hangs in the Waterloo Chamber at Windsor Castle alongside other European leaders of the era. Several other versions of the painting exist with one in the Kunsthistorisches Museum in Vienna.

== See also ==
- Portrait of Lord Castlereagh, Lawrence's portrait of Britain's Foreign Secretary who worked closely with Metternich
- Portrait of Francis I of Austria, Lawrence's depiction of Metternich's monarch

== Bibliography ==
- Levey, Michael. Sir Thomas Lawrence. Yale University Press, 2005. ISBN 0300109989.
- Siemann, Wolfram. Metternich: Strategist and Visionary. Harvard University Press, 2019. ISBN 9780674245921.
