= Stour Valley and Dedham Church =

Painting by John Constable

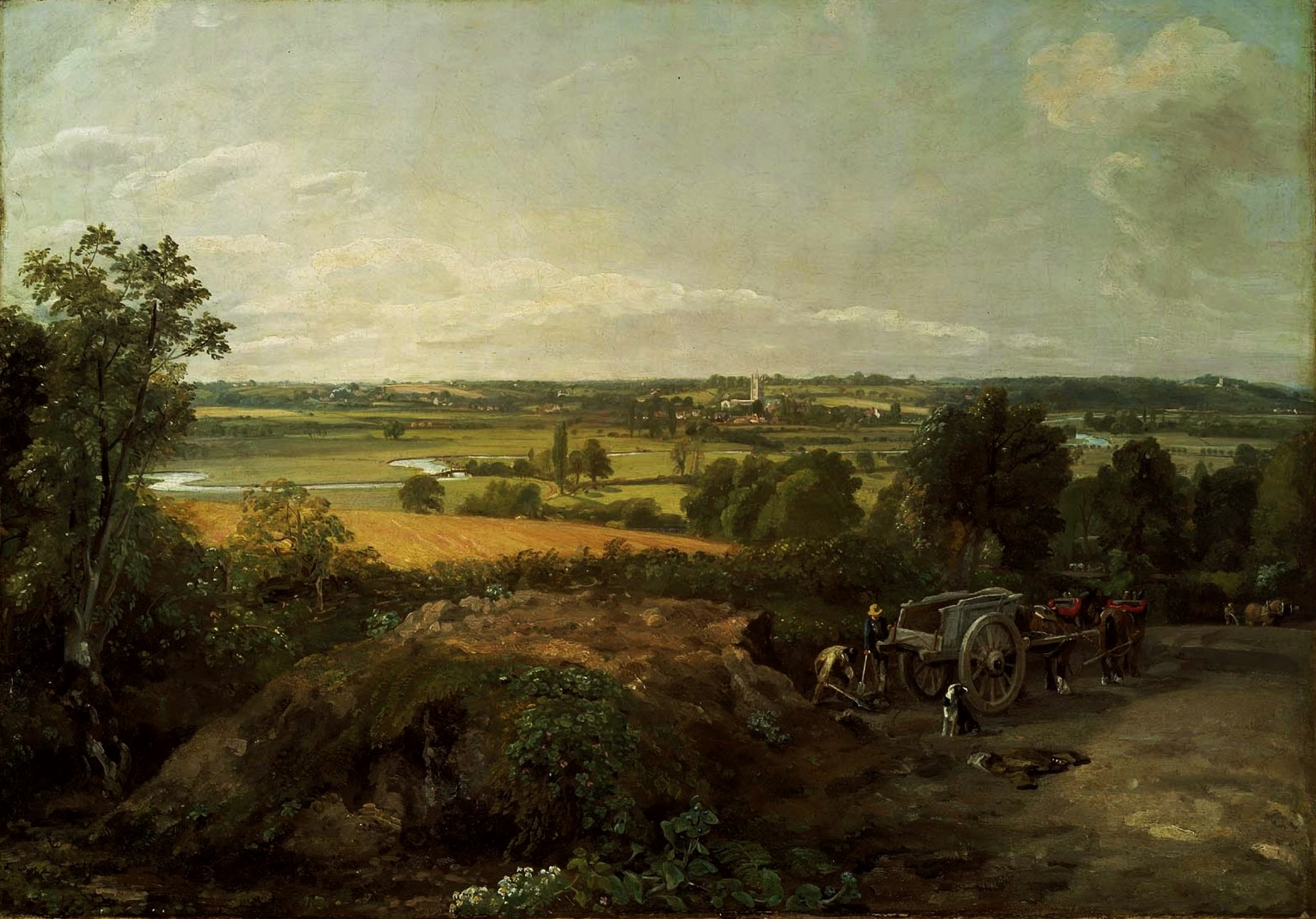
- Artist: John Constable
- Year: c.1815
- Type: Oil on canvas, Landscape painting
- Dimensions: 55 cm × 78 cm (21.8 in × 30.6 in)
- Location: Museum of Fine Arts, Boston, Massachusetts

Stour Valley and Dedham Church is a landscape painting by the British artist John Constable. Like many of his works it features a scene of the River Stour in his native Suffolk close to the border with Essex. In the distance is the church at Dedham. In the foreground farmworkers are loading a cart.

It was commissioned as a wedding present for Philadelphia Godfrey, the daughter of a local squire, by her husband. It shows the river valley in autumn from the grounds of her father's house. It was intended to a memento for her for a scene she knew well. It was displayed at the Royal Academy's Spring Exhibition at Somerset House in 1815. It is now in the collection of the Museum of Fine Arts in Boston having been acquired in 1948.

== See also ==
- List of paintings by John Constable

== Bibliography ==
- Charles, Victoria. Constable. Parkstone International, 2015.
- Gray, Anne & Gage, John. Constable: Impressions of Land, Sea and Sky. National Gallery of Australia, 2006.
- Hamilton, James. Constable: A Portrait. Hachette UK, 2022.
- Helsinger, Elizabeth K. Rural Scenes and National Representation: Britain, 1815-1850. Princeton University Press, 2014.
- Miller, Angela L. The Empire of the Eye: Landscape Representation and American Cultural Politics, 1825-1875. Cornell University Press, 1993.
- Venning, Barry. Constable. Parkstone International, 2015.
