= Christ Rejected, Study =

1811 drawing by Benjamin West

Study for Christ Rejected
- Artist: Benjamin West
- Year: 1811
- Medium: Oil on paper laid down on panel
- Dimensions: 30 7/8 x 42 1/8 inches (78.4 x 107 cm)
- Location: Memorial Art Gallery, Rochester, New York

Study for "Christ Rejected" is a preparatory drawing by the American-born British artist Benjamin West (1738–1820), renowned for his contributions to history painting in the 18th century. This study served as a precursor to his larger work "Christ Rejected?", a scene depicting Christ’s trial before the crowd and Pontius Pilate. The study focuses on the arrangement of figures, lighting, and composition, elements that would later be fully realized in the final version of the painting.

== Composition and technique ==
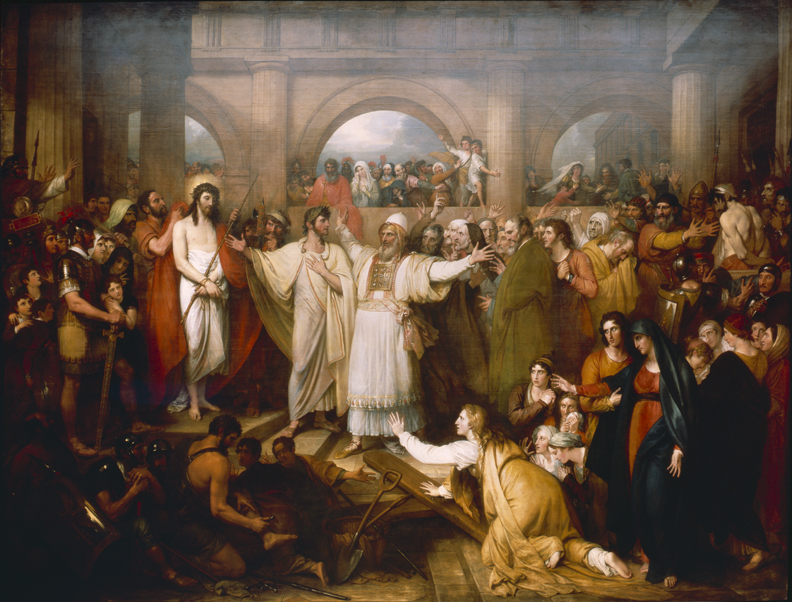
Christ Rejected by Benjamin West, 1814, Oil on canvas, 200 x 260 in. (508.0 x 660.4 cm.), Pennsylvania Academy of the Fine Arts, accession number 1878.1.9.

The composition of Study for "Christ Rejected" demonstrates West’s structuring of complex multi-figure scenes. The smaller scale of this preparatory work creates an intimacy that draws viewers in, inviting them to focus on the subtle emotions expressed by the figures. The figures are arranged around Christ, whose illuminated face draws the eye, a technique often seen in Baroque art, where light is used to direct the viewer’s attention. West’s use of chiaroscuro, the contrast between light and dark, plays a significant role in this work, as it emphasizes the moral and psychological tension present in the scene.

West also employs contour lines to define the figures and gestures, particularly in Christ’s serene expression of calm amidst rejection.

=== Influence ===
West’s work draws heavily from the traditions of classical antiquity and Renaissance masters like Raphael and Michelangelo. His approach to religious painting was also influenced by Baroque artists such as Caravaggio, who used light and shadow to heighten emotional intensity. The "study for Christ Rejected "shows these influences in its dynamic composition and the way light falls across the figures. West’s treatment of the crowd mirrors classical friezes, where figures are packed closely together in a linear arrangement, each figure contributing to the narrative flow.

The study also reflects West’s interest in moral storytelling, where the depiction of Christ not only serves a religious purpose but also communicates broader themes of justice, sacrifice, and human frailty. His intention was not just to illustrate a biblical scene but to convey the emotional and ethical complexity of Christ’s rejection, making the moment feel immediate and universal.

== Exhibition ==
Study for "Christ Rejected" by Benjamin West has been featured at the Memorial Art Gallery in Rochester, NY, as part of its permanent collection, with occasional public displays in exhibitions. In 1968, the study was first cataloged in a handbook supplement on acquisitions, cementing its place in the gallery’s archives. Since then, it has been periodically displayed, most notably in exhibitions that explore religious iconography and West’s influence on American and British art.
