= 1817 in art =

Events in the year 1817 in Art.

== Events ==
- May 5 – The Royal Academy Exhibition of 1817 opens at Somerset House in London
- October 5 – Hokusai paints the "Big Daruma" on paper measuring 18x10.8 m at the Hongan-ji Nagoya Betsuin in Nagoya, Japan.
- December 28 – English painter Benjamin Haydon introduces John Keats to William Wordsworth and Charles Lamb at a dinner in London to celebrate progress on his painting Christ's Entry into Jerusalem (in which all feature).
- unknown dates
  - Dulwich Picture Gallery in London, designed by John Soane as Britain's first purpose-built public art gallery, is completed and opened to the general public.
  - The Vatican art collection is returned to the possession of the Church, with the help of the sculptor Antonio Canova.

== Works ==
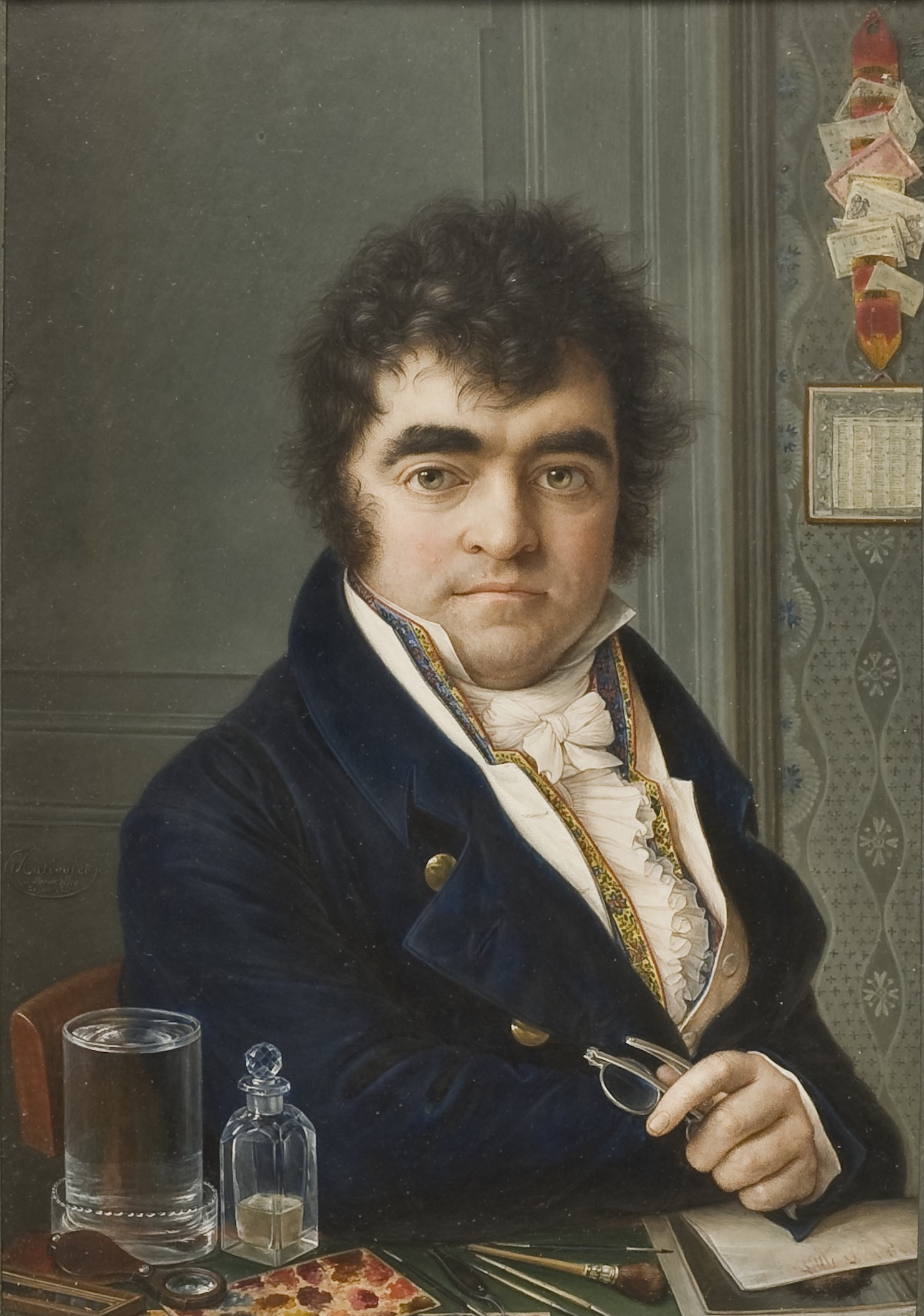
Miniature self-portrait by Autissier. In the foreground, the artist's pencils, brushes, and tools for painting miniatures can be seen. Watercolour on ivory, 19.1 × 13.5 cm (7.52 × 5.31 in), Nationalmuseum, Stockholm

- Martin Archer Shee
  - Portrait of Thomas Moore
  - Portrait of William Roscoe
- Louis-Marie Autissier – Miniature self-portrait
- François Joseph Bosio – Hyacinth Awaiting His Turn
- Antonio Canova – The Three Graces (marble sculpture, Woburn Abbey, England)
- Francis Chantrey – The Sleeping Children (marble sculpture, Lichfield Cathedral, England)
- John Constable
  - Fen Lane, East Bergholt
  - Flatford Mill (Scene on a Navigable River)
  - Weymouth Bay: Bowleaze Cove and Jordon Hill
- John Crome – Boys Bathing on the River Wensum
- George Dawe – Portrait of Princess Charlotte of Wales
- François Gérard – Entry of Henry IV into Paris
- Antoine-Jean Gros – The Departure of Louis XVIII from the Tuileries Palace
- John James Halls – Portrait of George Cockburn
- George Henry Harlow – The Court for the Trial of Queen Katharine
- George Hayter – The Tribute Money
- George Francis Joseph – Portrait of Stamford Raffles
- Orest Kiprensky – Young Gardener
- Thomas Lawrence
  - Portrait of the Countess of Plymouth
  - Portrait of Lord Uxbridge
  - Portrait of Thomas Graham
- John Martin – The Bard
- Nicolas-André Monsiau – Louis XVI Giving His Instructions to La Pérouse
- François-Joseph Navez – Portrait of Jacques-Louis David
- Raphaelle Peale - Orange and Book (c.)
- Thomas Phillips – The Allied Sovereigns at Petworth
- Pierre-Paul Prud'hon – Charles Maurice de Talleyrand-Périgord
- J. M. W. Turner
  - The Decline of the Carthaginian Empire
  - Raby Castle
- David Wilkie
  - Bathsheba at the Bath
  - Sheepwashing

== Births ==
- January 29 – John Callcott Horsley, English painter (died 1903)
- February 15 – Charles-François Daubigny, French painter (died 1878)
- February 23 – George Frederic Watts, English painter and sculptor (died 1904)
- February 28 – Walter Hood Fitch, Scottish-born botanical artist (died 1892)
- March 1 – Joséphine Calamatta, French painter and engraver (died 1893)
- March 7 – Alexandre Antigna, French painter (died 1878)
- April 4 – P. C. Skovgaard, Danish romantic nationalist landscape painter (died 1875)
- July 1 – John Gilbert, English painter (died 1897)
- August 1 – Richard Dadd, English painter and draughtsman (died 1886)
- August 4 – Antoine Dominique Magaud, French painter (died 1899)
- November 3 – Ernest Hébert, French painter and academician (died 1908)
- November 22 – François Bonvin, French realist painter (died 1887)

== Deaths ==
- March 27 – Josiah Boydell, publisher and painter (born 1752)
- May 10 – Georg Haas, Danish engraver (born 1751)
- June – Claude-Jean-Baptiste Hoin, French portrait and landscape painter (born 1750)
- June 4 – Daniël Dupré, Dutch engraver, painter, draftsman, and watercolorist (born 1751)
- September – Thomas Wyon, engraver of medals (born 1792)
- September 8 – John Carter, English draughtsman and architect (born 1748)
- October 13 – Julius Caesar Ibbetson, landscape painter (born 1759)
- November 5 – Carl Haller von Hallerstein, art historian (born 1774)
- November 8 – Andrea Appiani, neoclassical painter (born 1754)
- December 20 – Lié Louis Périn-Salbreux, painter, pastellist and miniaturist (born 1753)
- December 27 – Pierre-Michel Alix, French engraver (born 1762)
- date unknown
  - Jean Népomucène Hermann Nast, porcelain manufacturer (born 1754)
  - Joaquín Bernardo Rubert, Spanish still life floral painter (born 1772)
