= Royal Academy Exhibition of 1817 =

1817 art exhibition in London

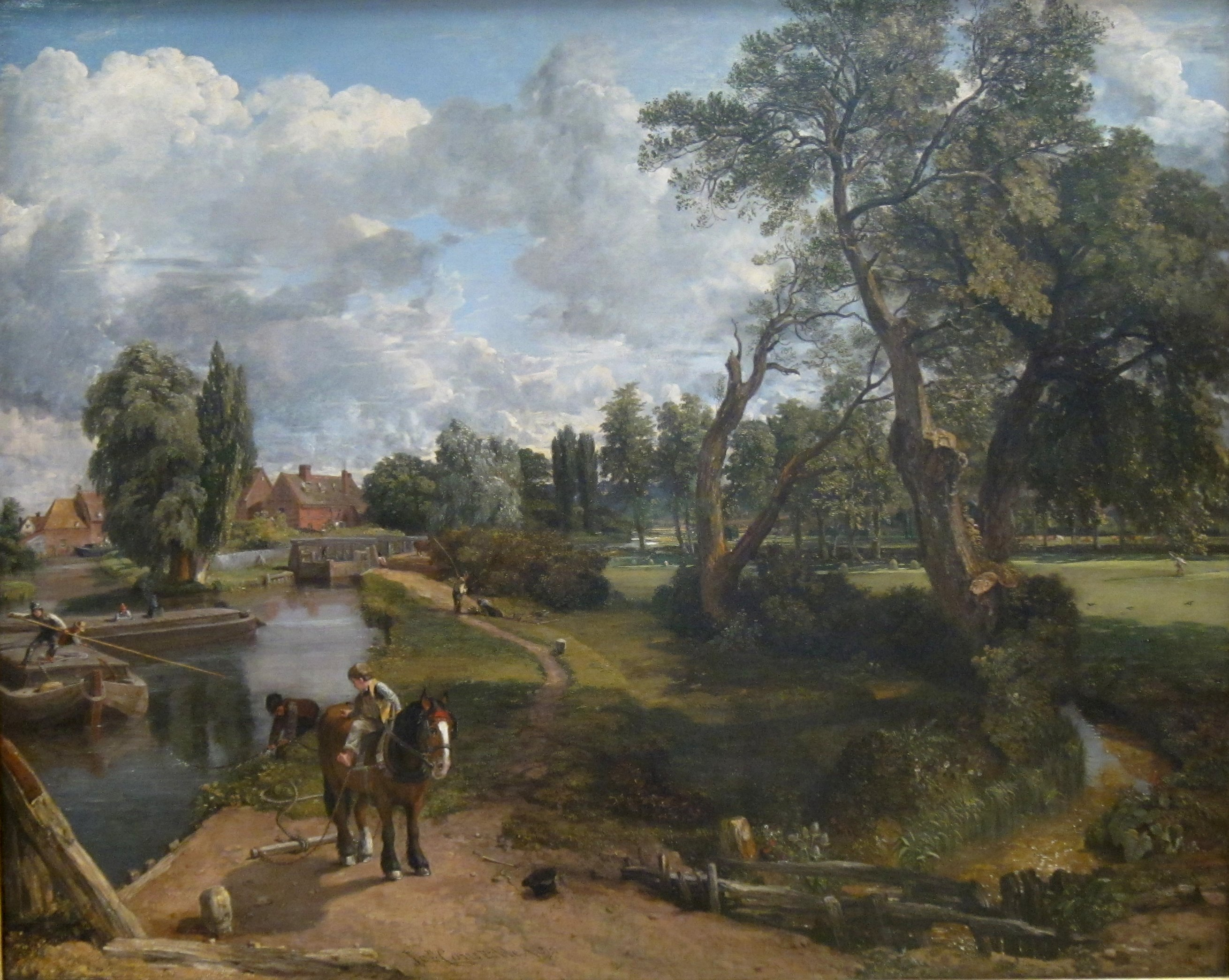
Flatford Mill by John Constable

The Royal Academy Exhibition of 1817 was the forty ninth annual Summer Exhibition of the British Royal Academy of Arts. It was held at Somerset House between 5 May and 28 June 1817, during the Regency era.

John Constable exhibited four paintings including the landscape painting Wivenhoe Park featuring a picturesque scene in Essex, and a portrait of his friend John Fisher. Thomas Lawrence, the leading portraitist of the period, displayed his Portrait of Lord Uxbridge featuring one of the most famous figures of the Battle of Waterloo. George Dawe submitted portraits of both Princess Charlotte of Wales and her new husband Prince Leopold.

The Scottish artist David Wilkie displayed a genre painting The Breakfast. One of the most commented on works in the exhibition was The Court for the Trial of Queen Katharine by George Henry Harlow featuring Sarah Siddons and other members of the theatrical Kemble family performing in William Shakespeare's play Henry VIII. The Italian sculptor Antonio Canova displayed his statue Hebe.

== Gallery ==
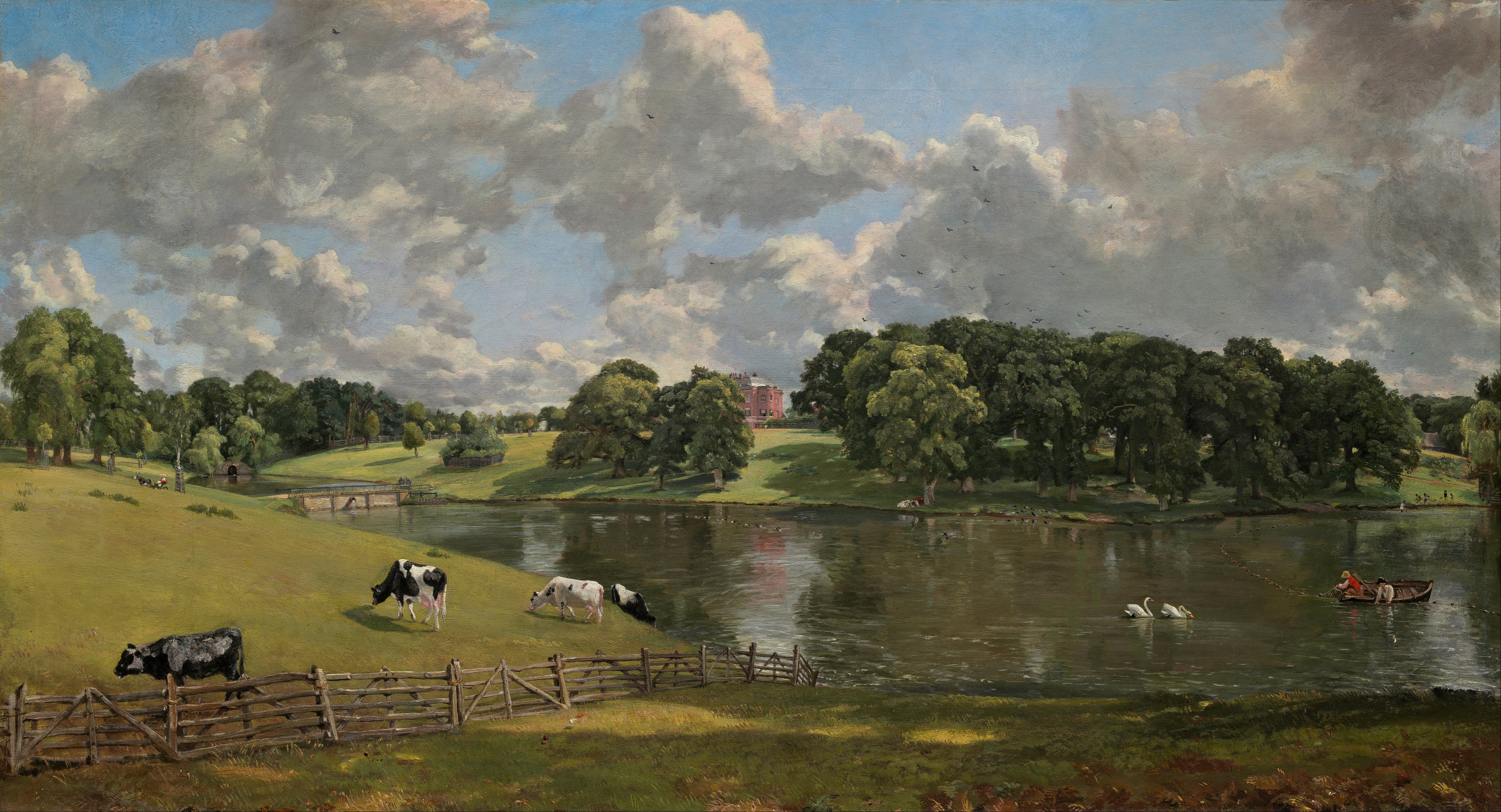
Wivenhoe Park by John Constable

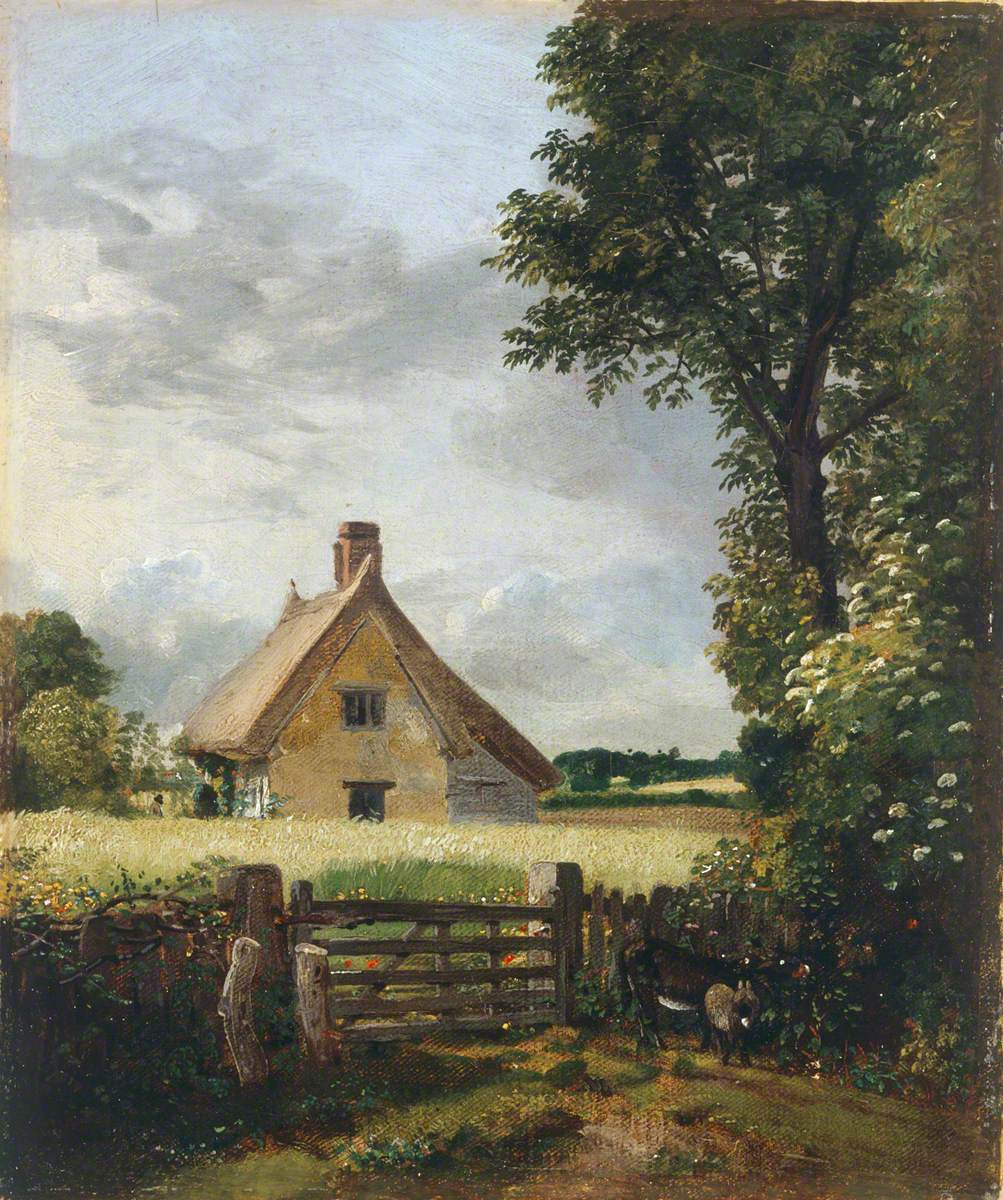
A Cottage in a Cornfield by John Constable

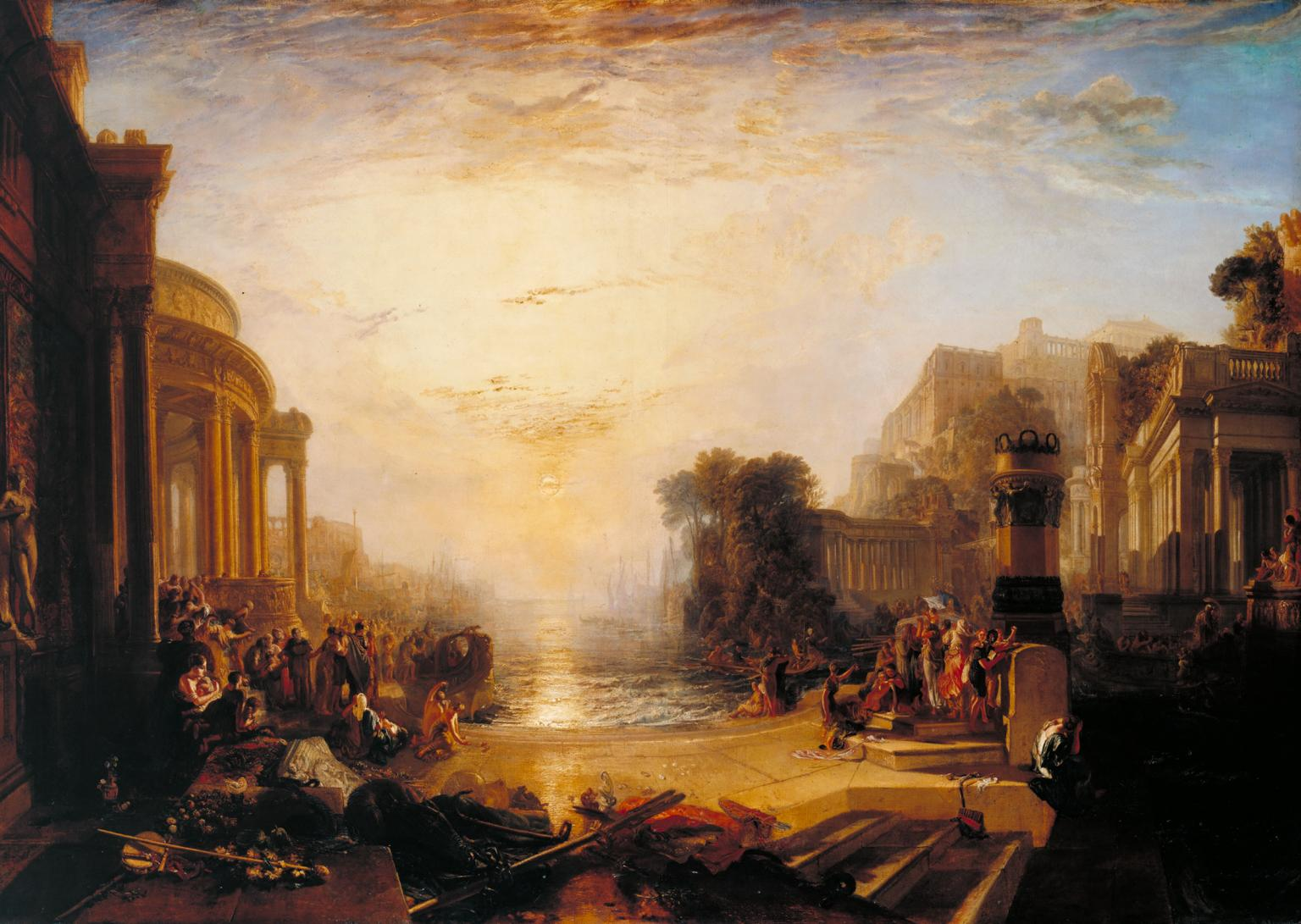
The Decline of the Carthaginian Empire by J.M.W. Turner

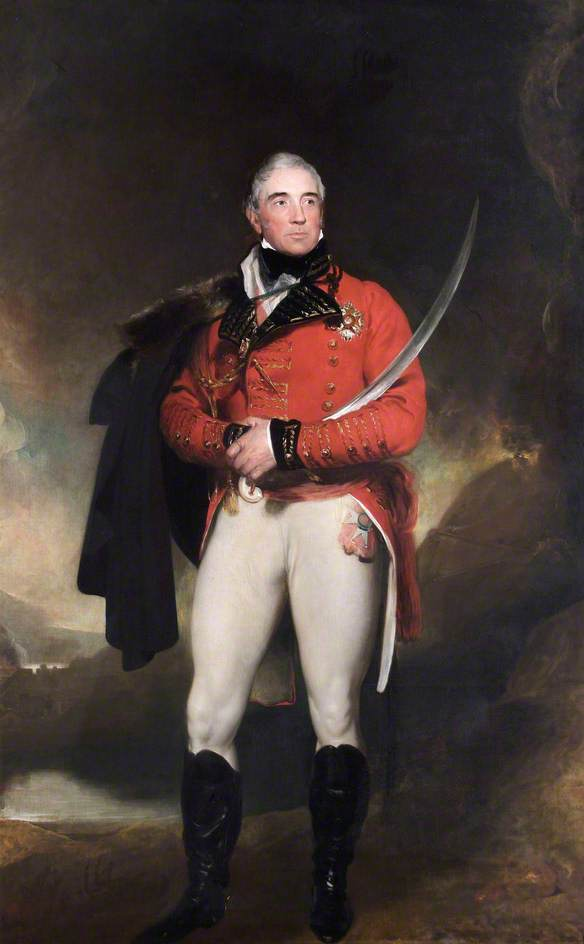
Portrait of Thomas Graham by Thomas Lawrence

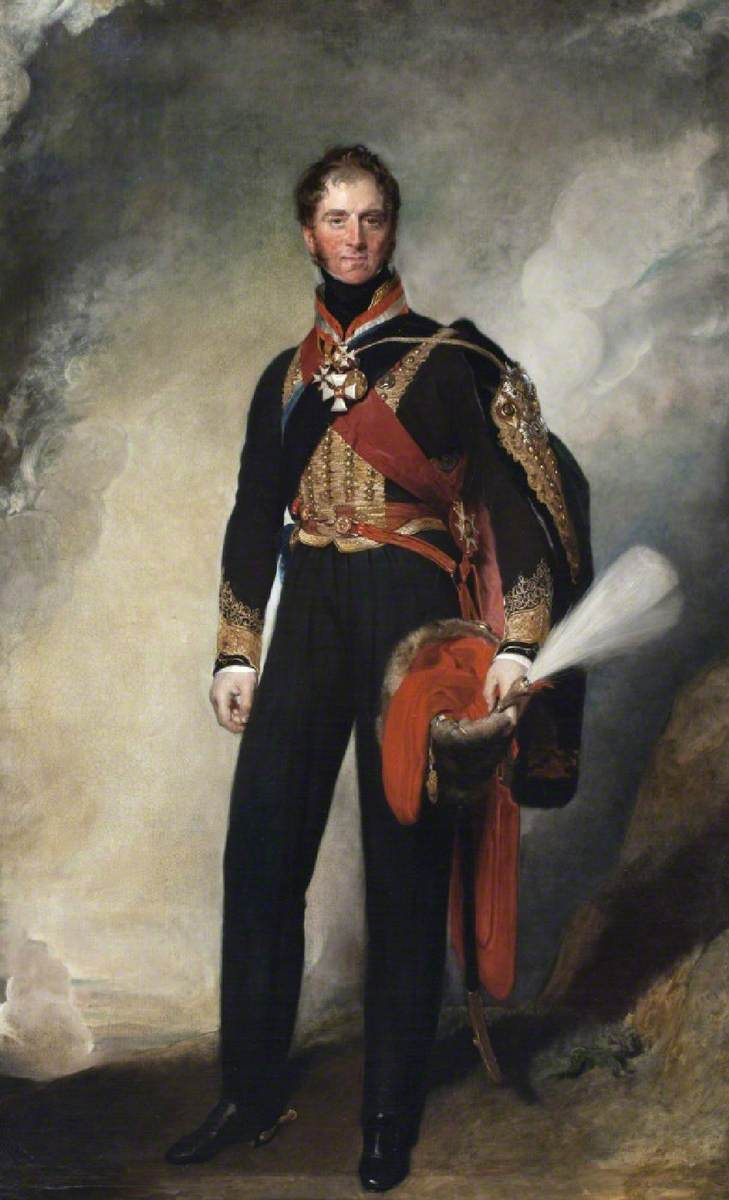
Portrait of Lord Uxbridge by Thomas Lawrence

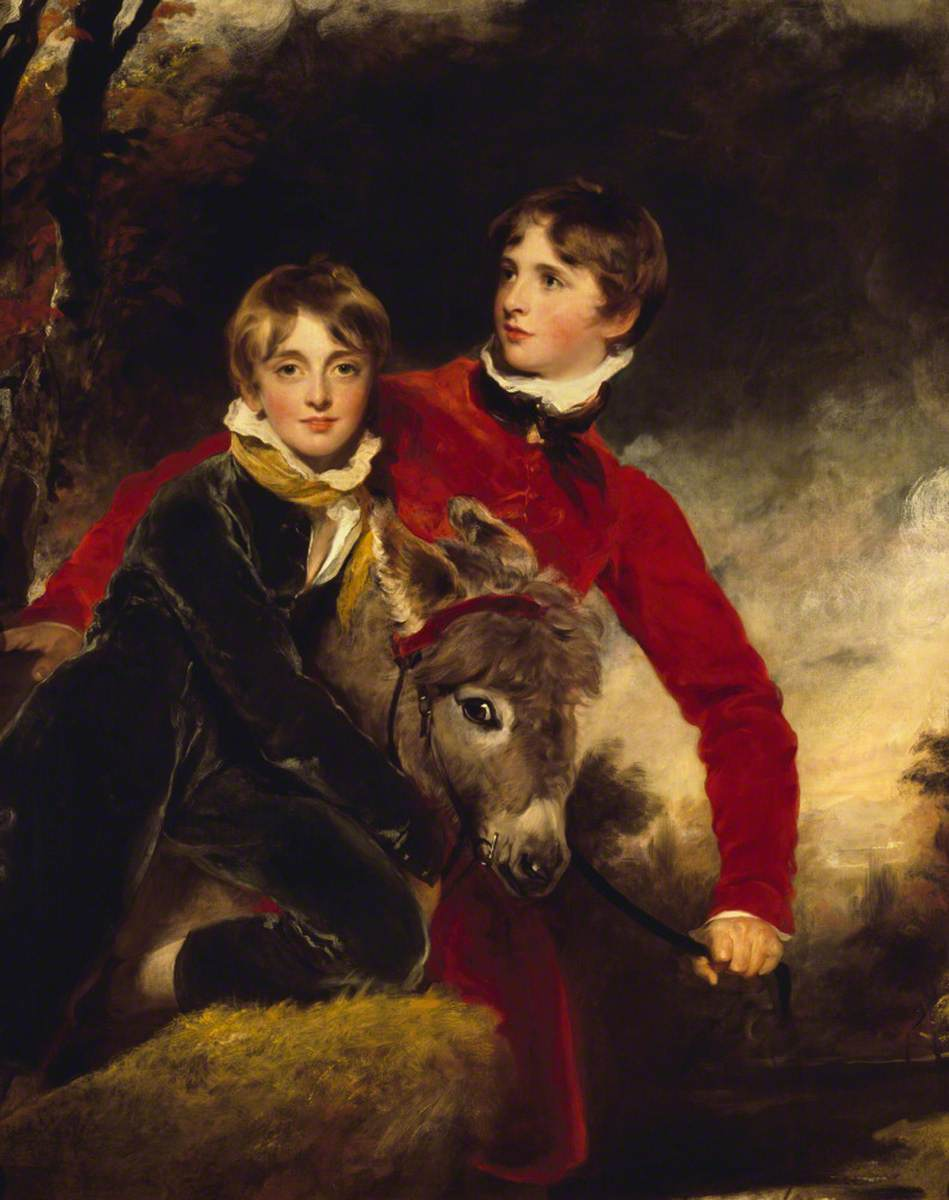
The Pattison Brothers by Thomas Lawrence

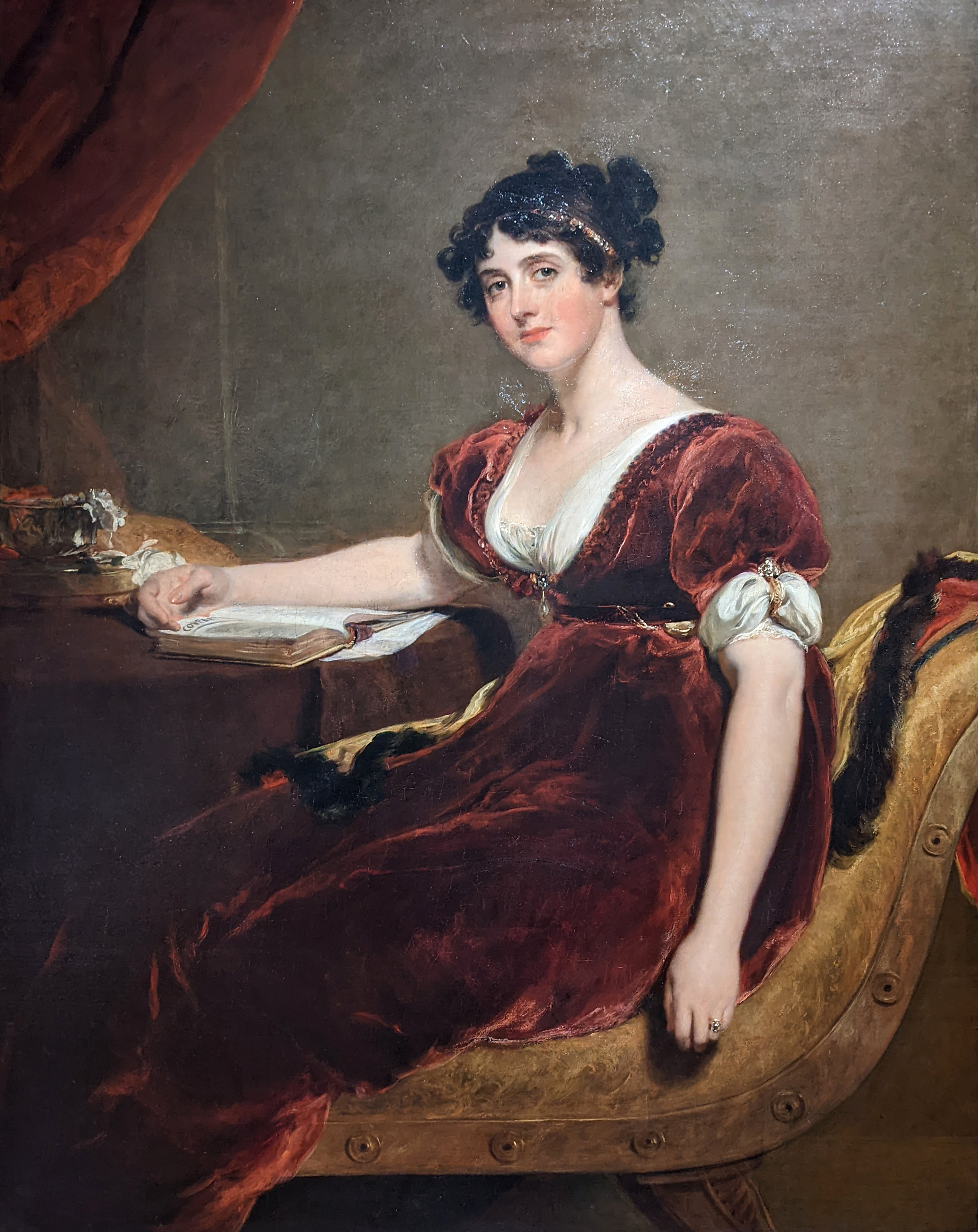
Portrait of Mrs. Cuthbert by Thomas Lawrence

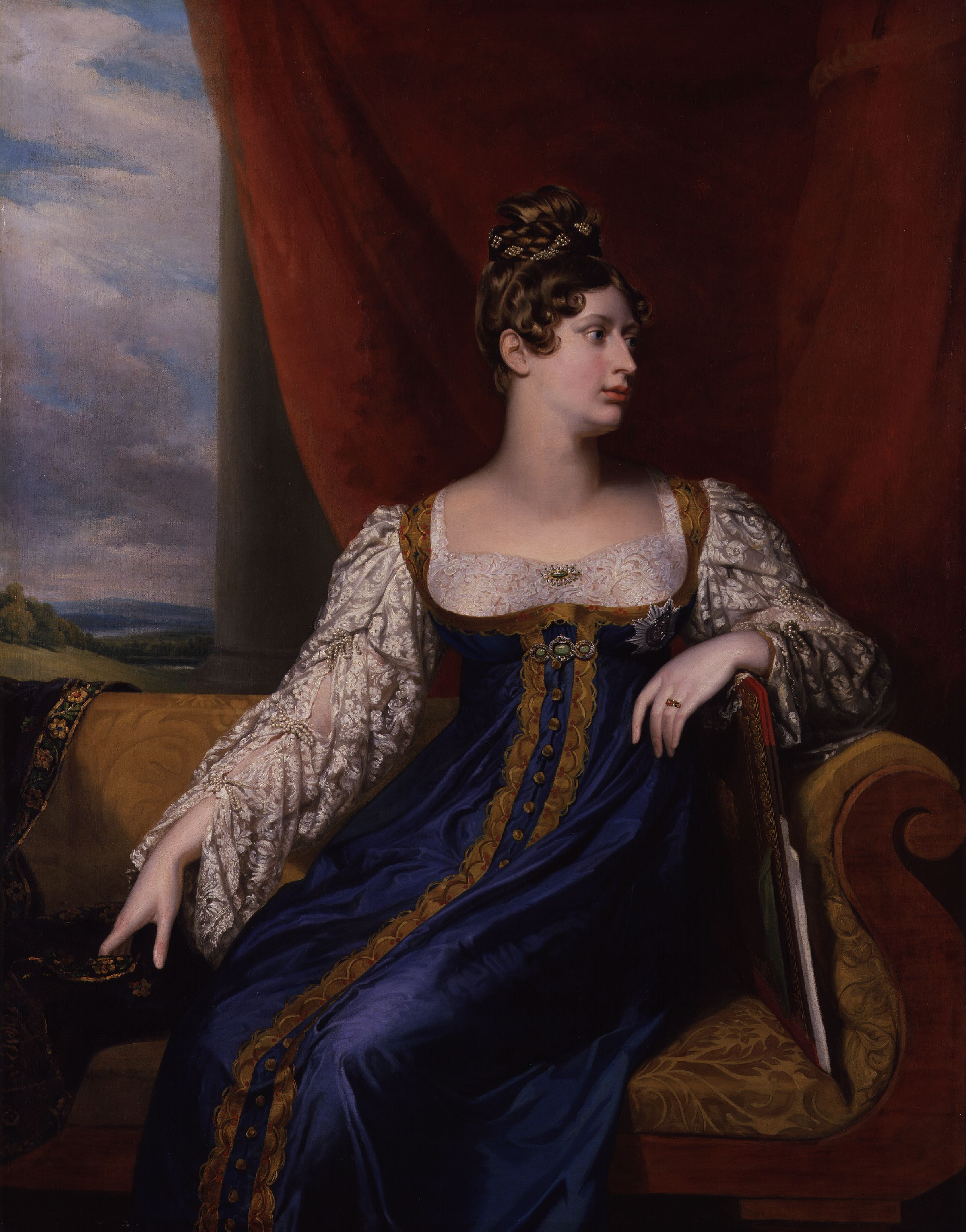
Portrait of Princess Charlotte Augusta of Wales by George Dawe

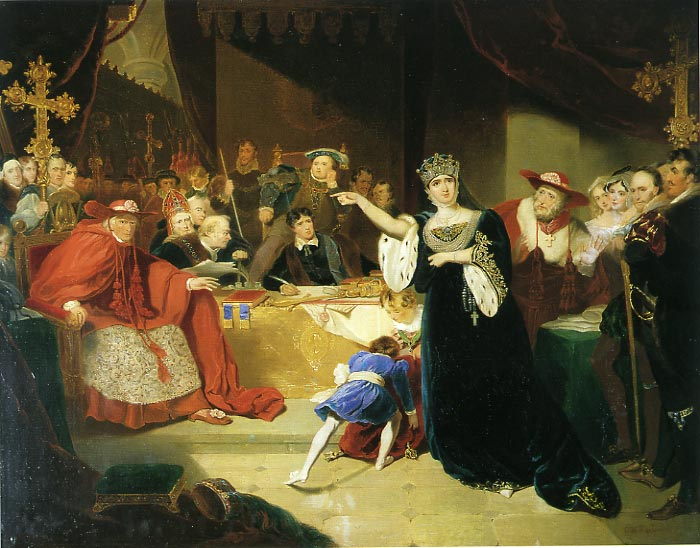
The Court for the Trial of Queen Katharine by George Henry Harlow

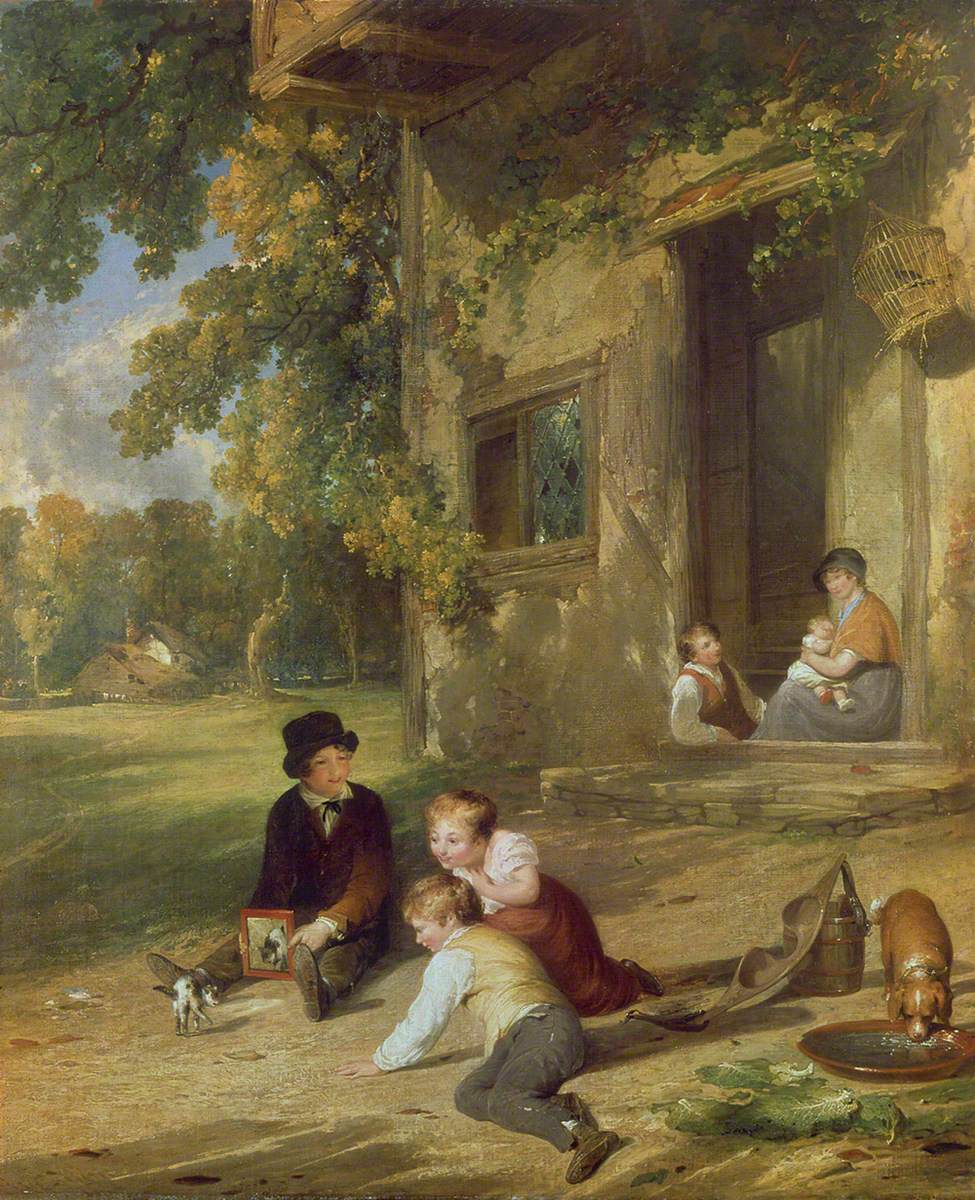
The Kitten Deceived by William Collins

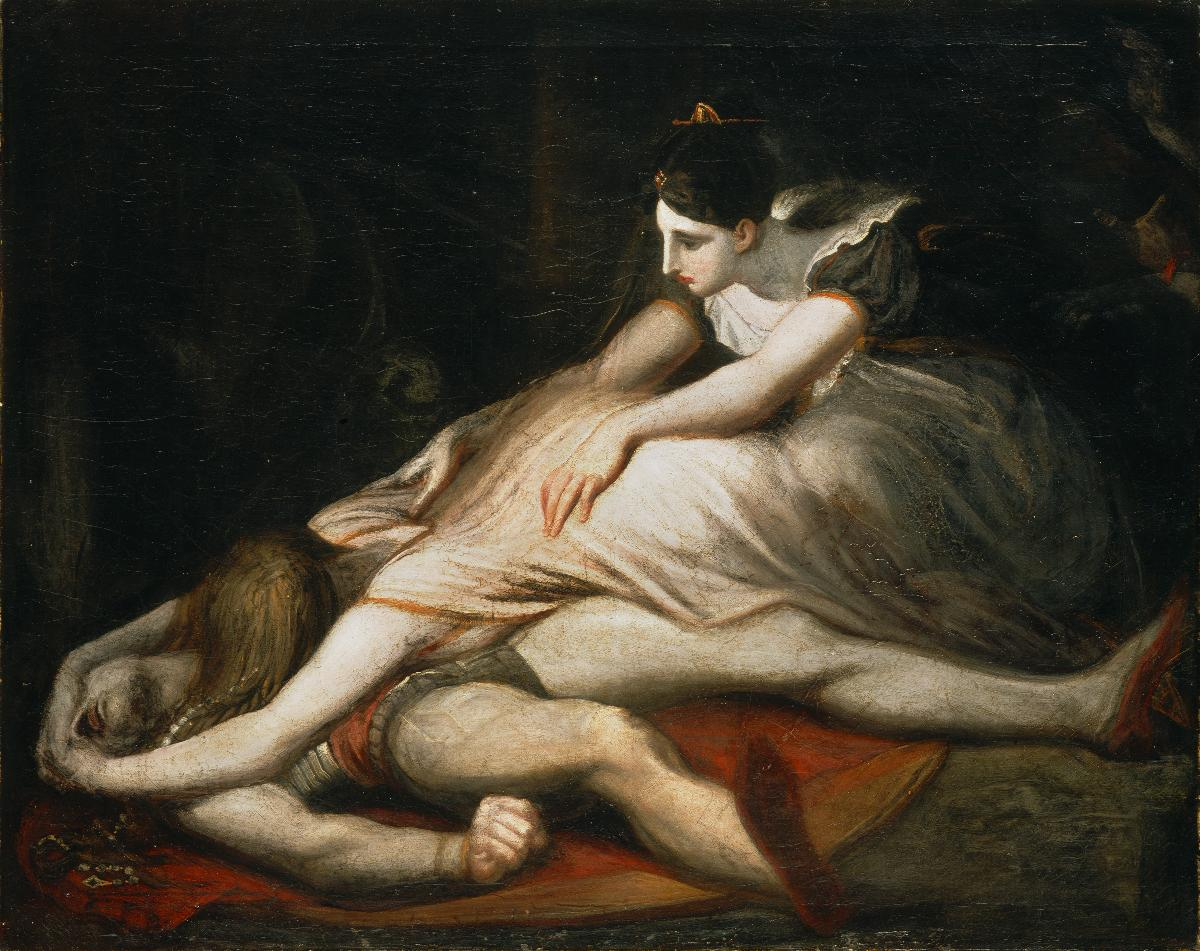
Creimhild Throwing Herself on the Body of Siegfried by Henry Fuseli

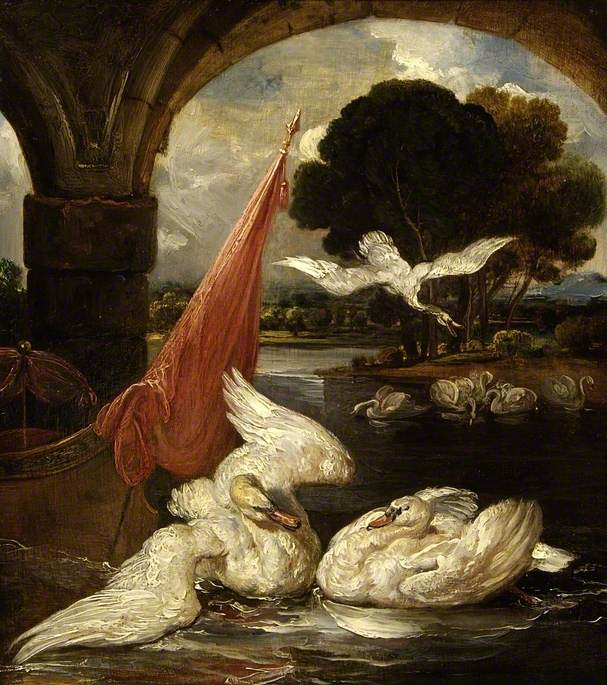
The Descent of the Swan by James Ward

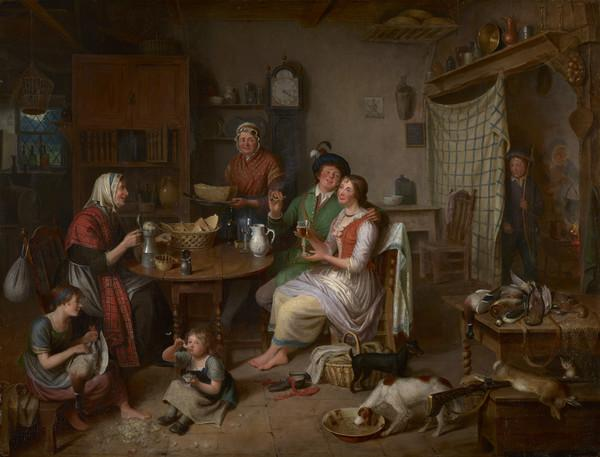
Andro' wi' His Cutty Gun by Alexander Carse

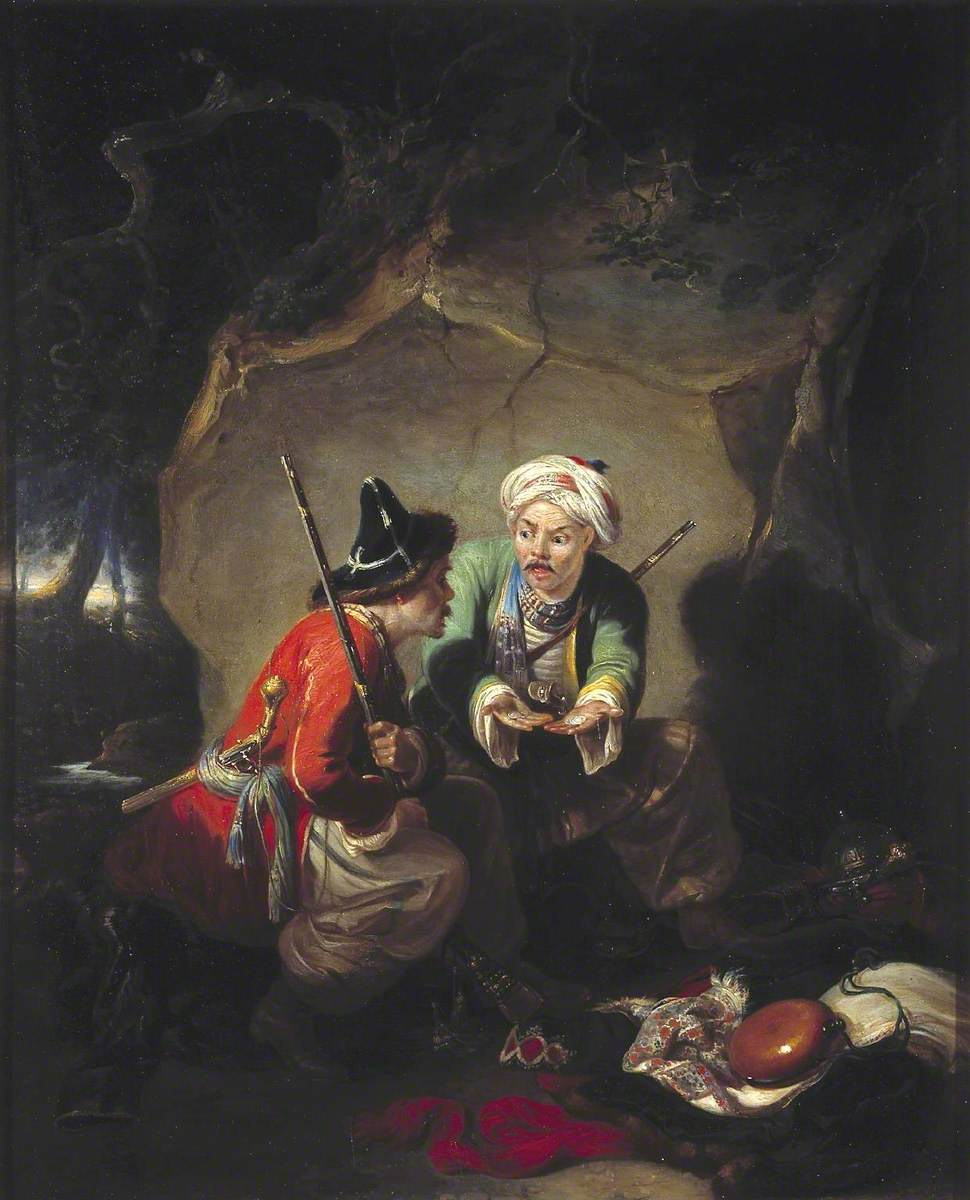
Tartar Robbers Dividing Their Spoil by William Allan

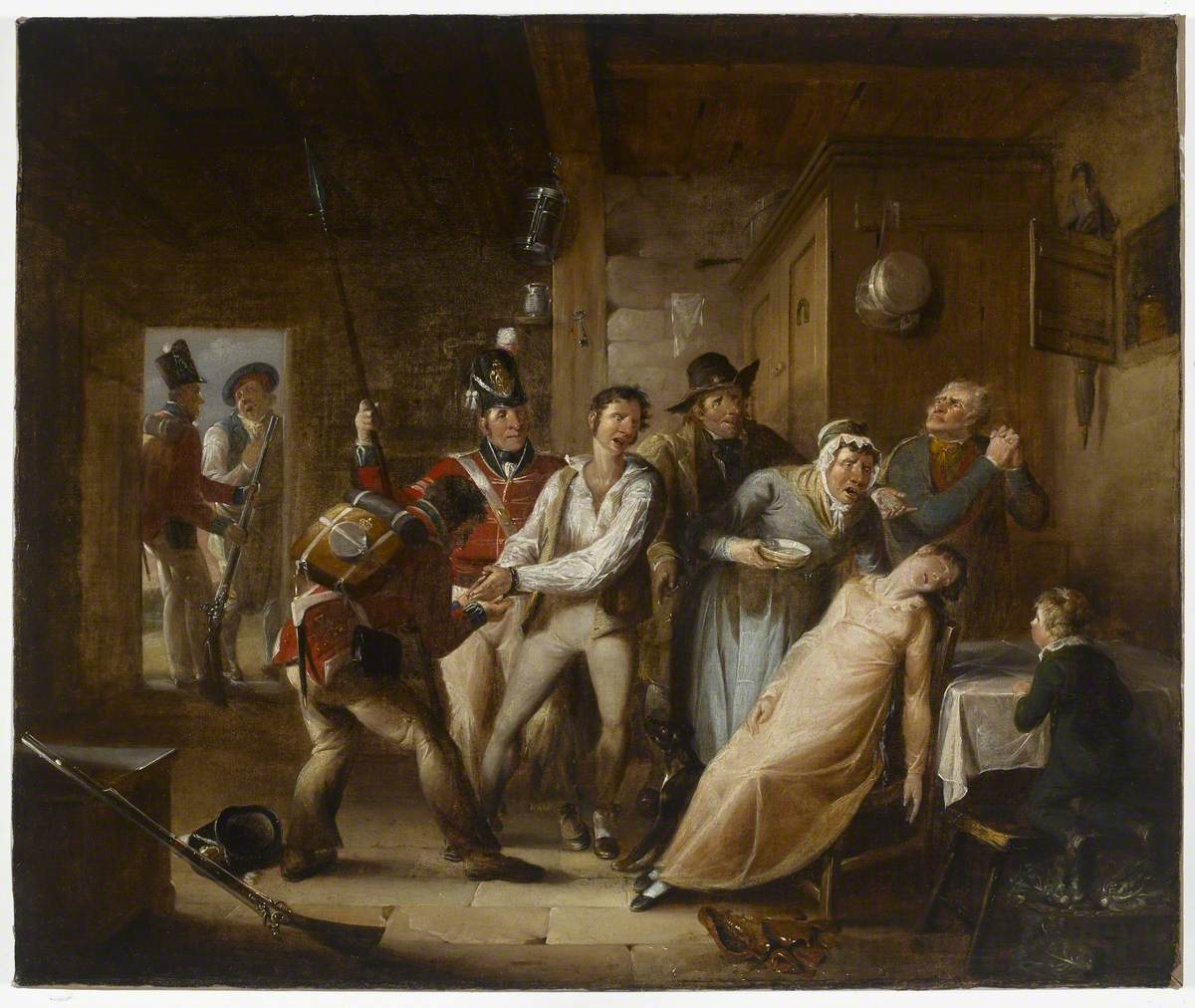
The Deserter Taken by William Kidd

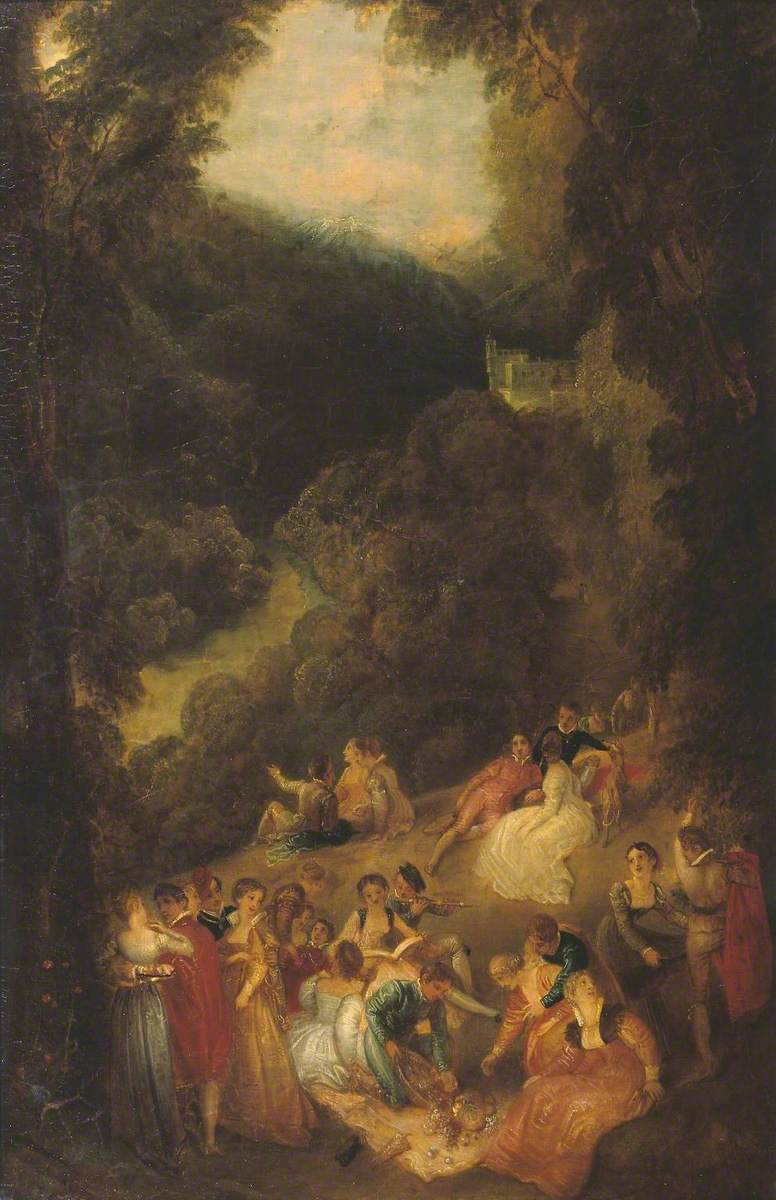
Sans Souci by Thomas Stothard

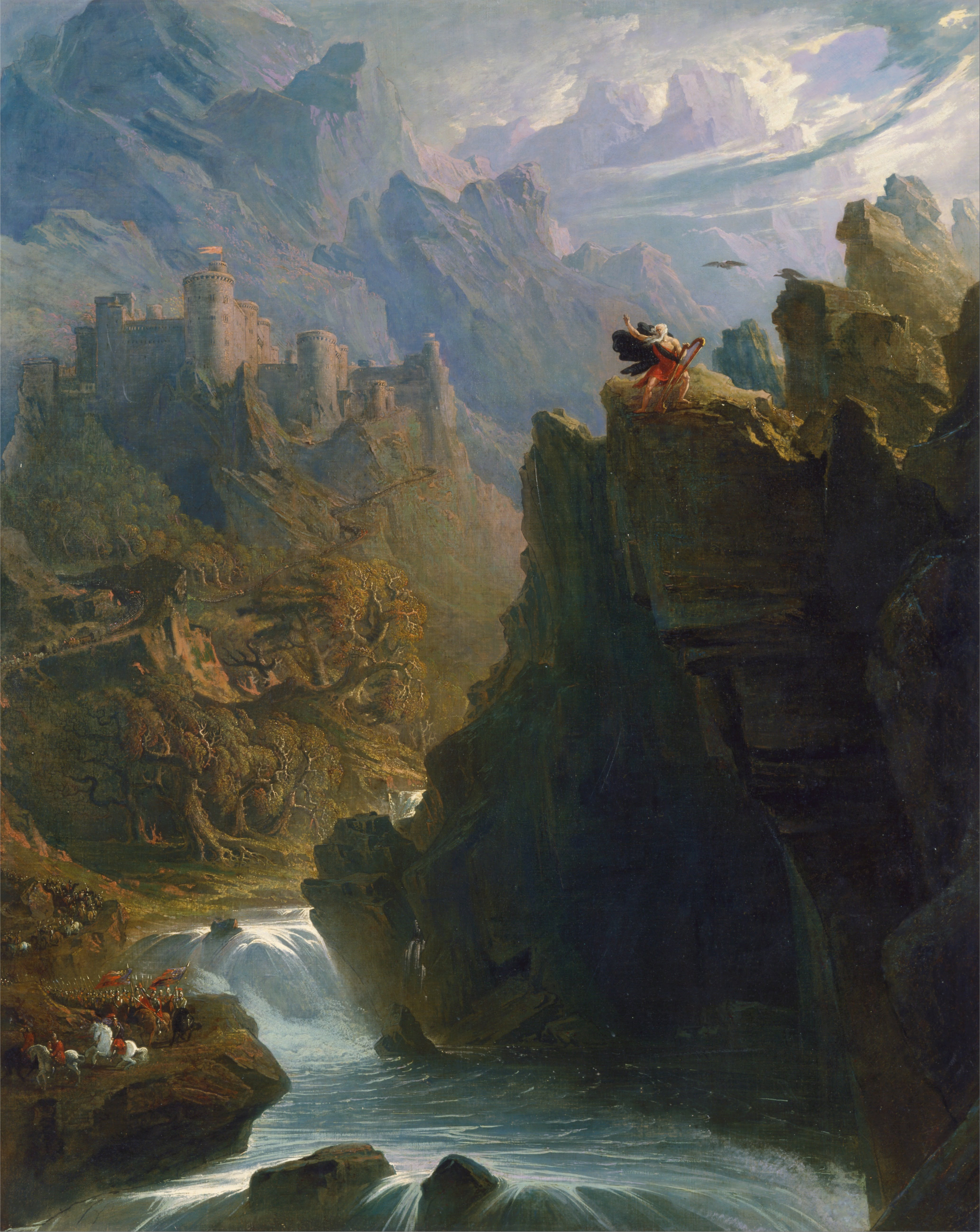
The Bard by John Martin

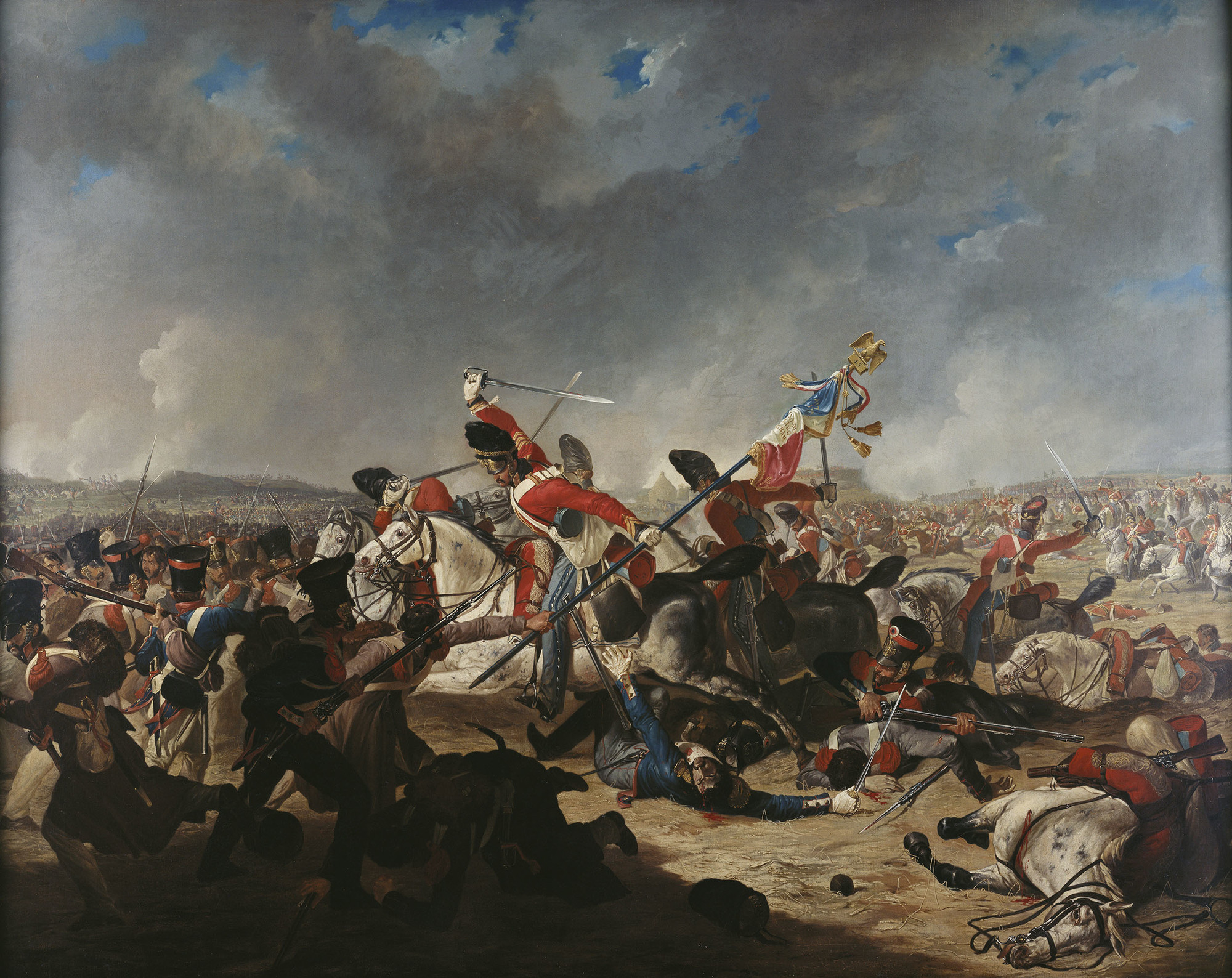
The Battle of Waterloo by Denis Dighton

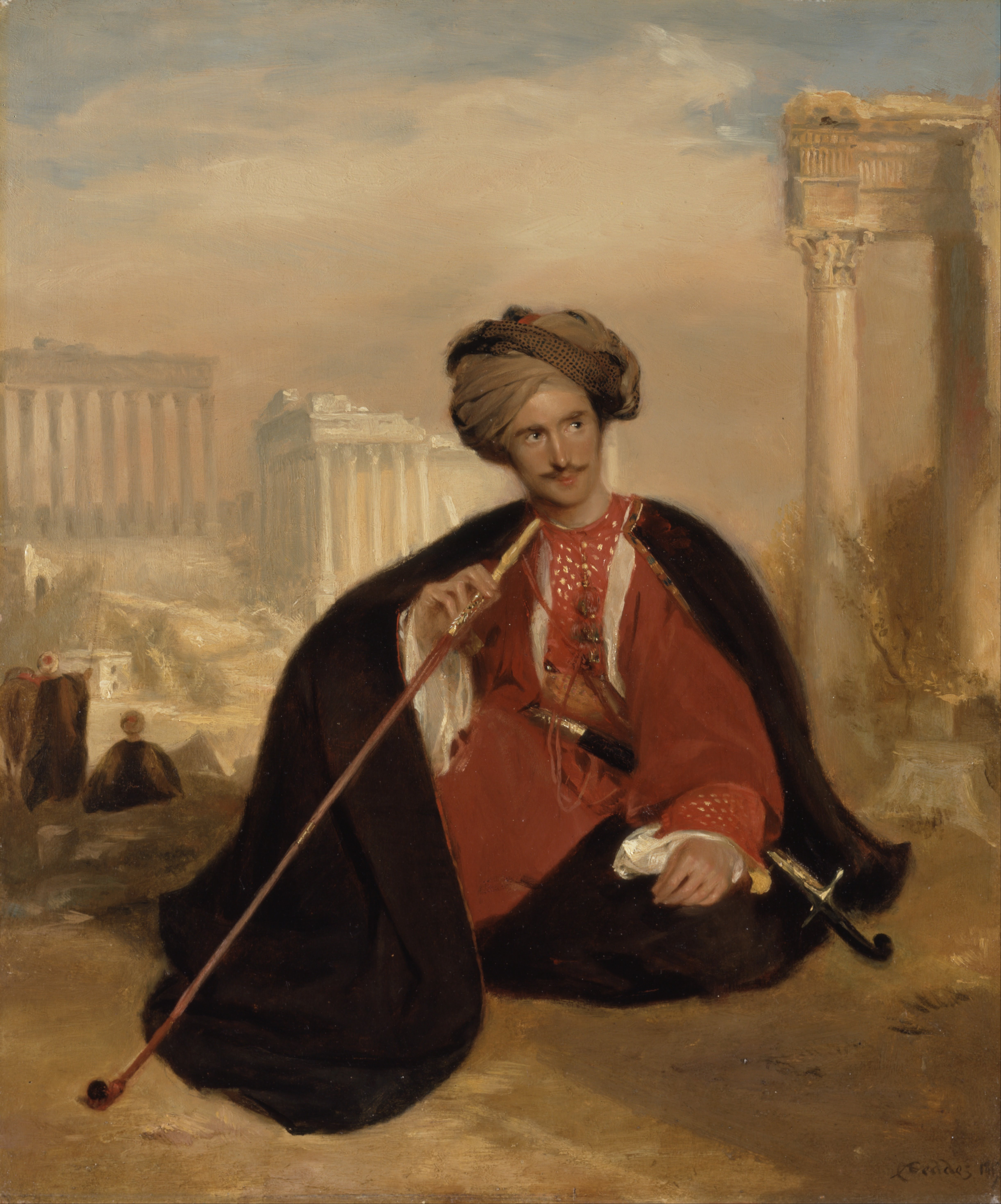
Charles Lenox Cumming-Bruce in Syrian Dress by Andrew Geddes

Portrait of John Fisher by John Constable

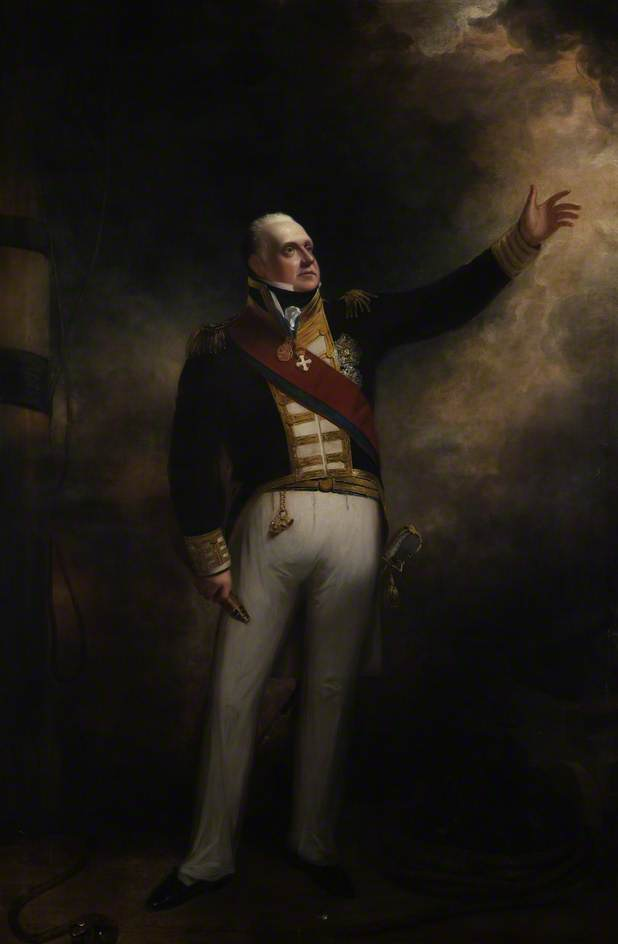
Portrait of Lord Exmouth by William Beechey

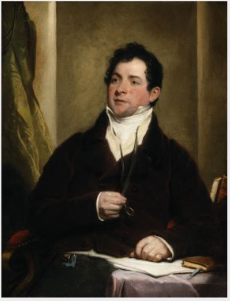
Portrait of Thomas Moore by Martin Archer Shee

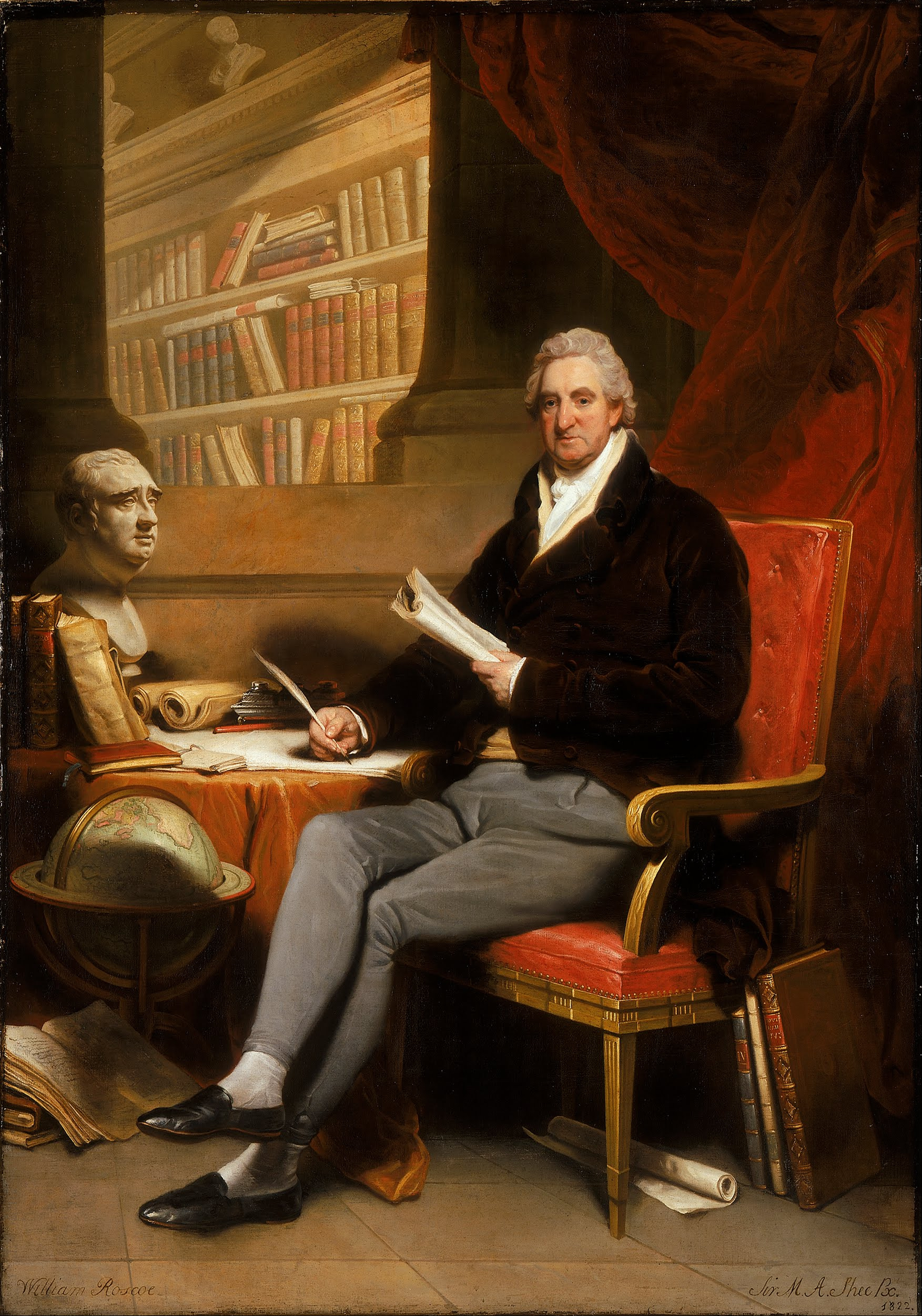
Portrait of William Roscoe by Martin Archer Shee

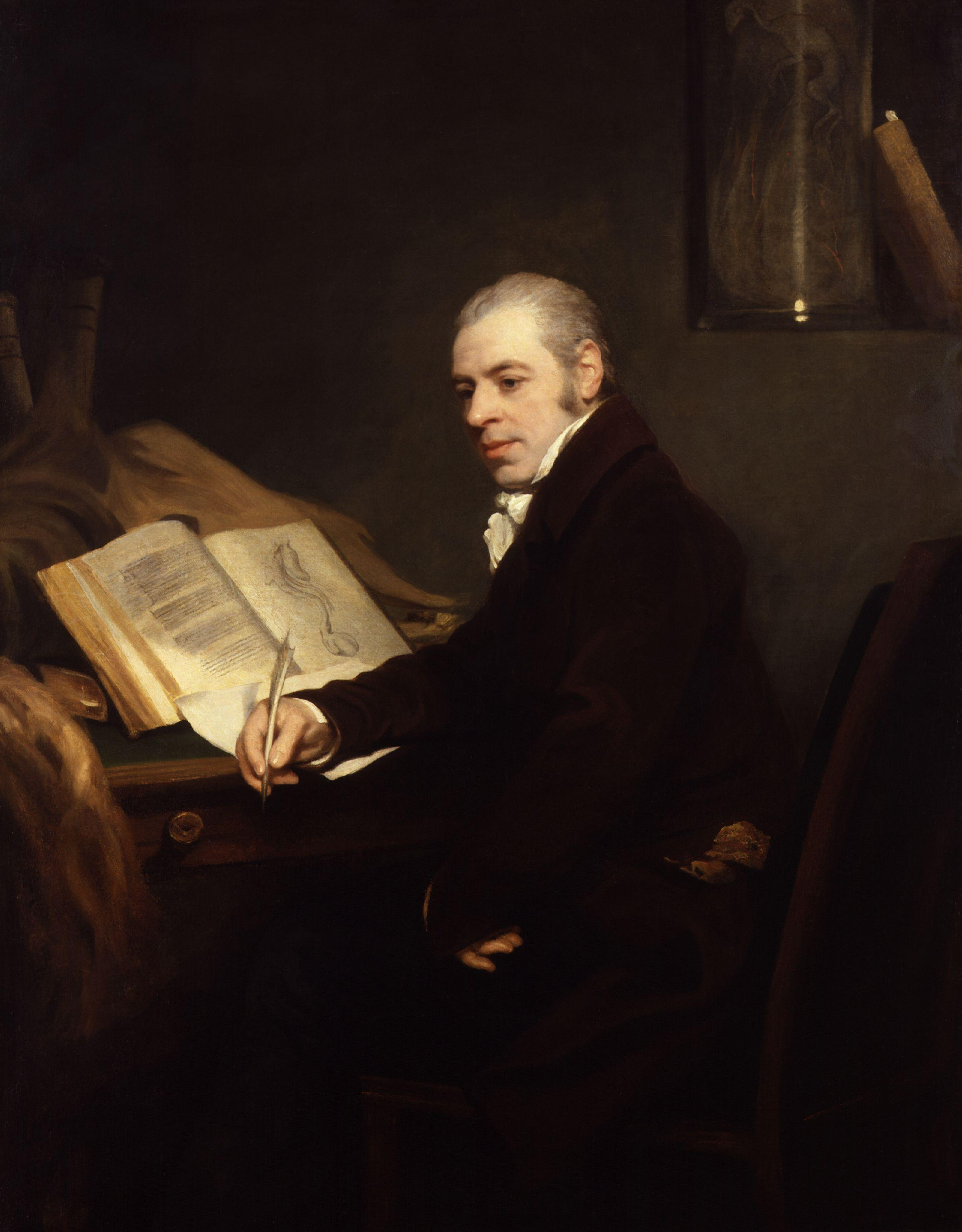
Portrait of Joshua Brookes by Thomas Phillips

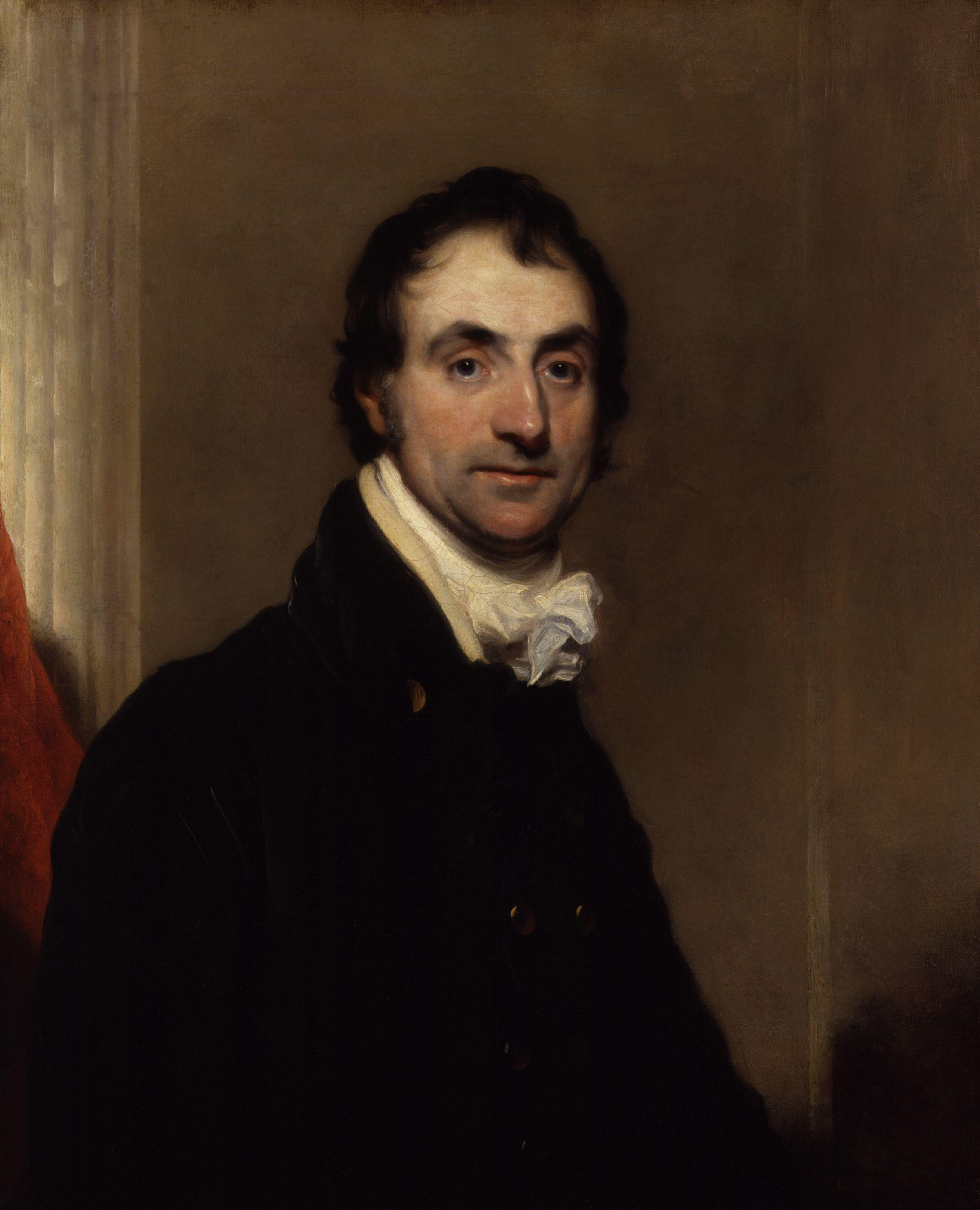
Portrait of Sharon Turner by Martin Archer Shee

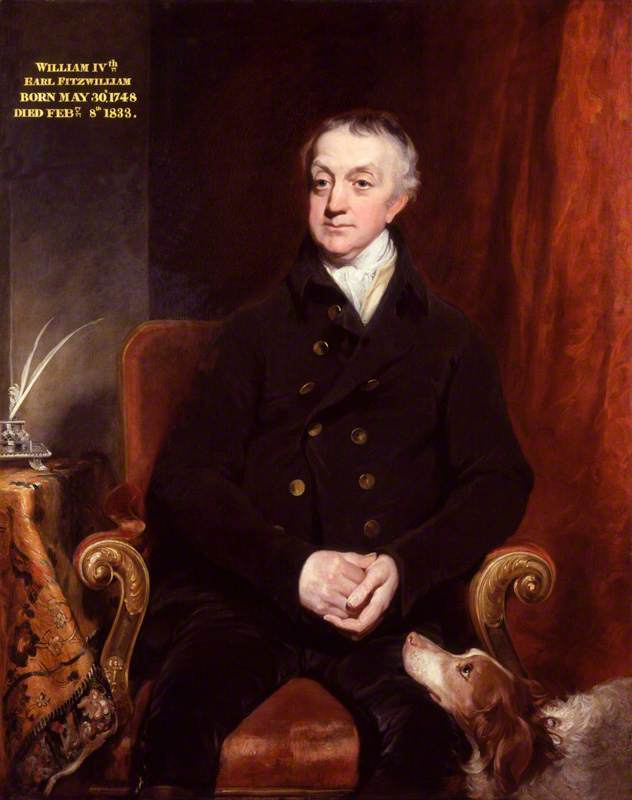
Portrait of Earl Fitzwilliam by William Owen

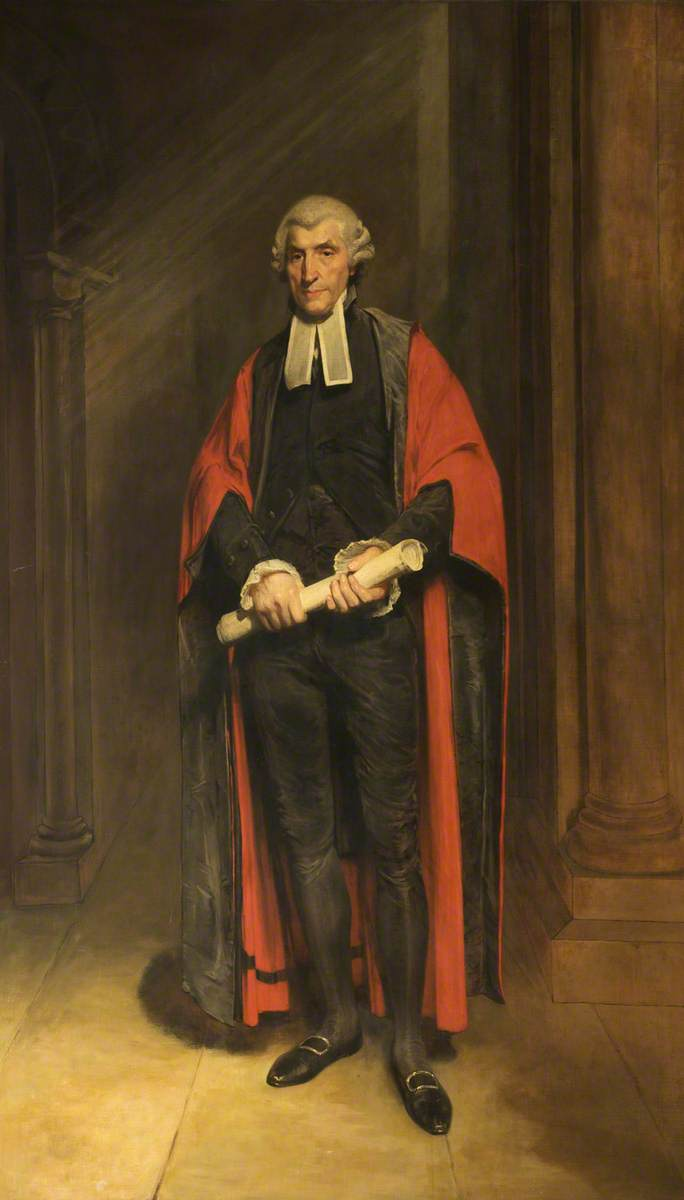
Portrait of Hugh Leycester by William Owen

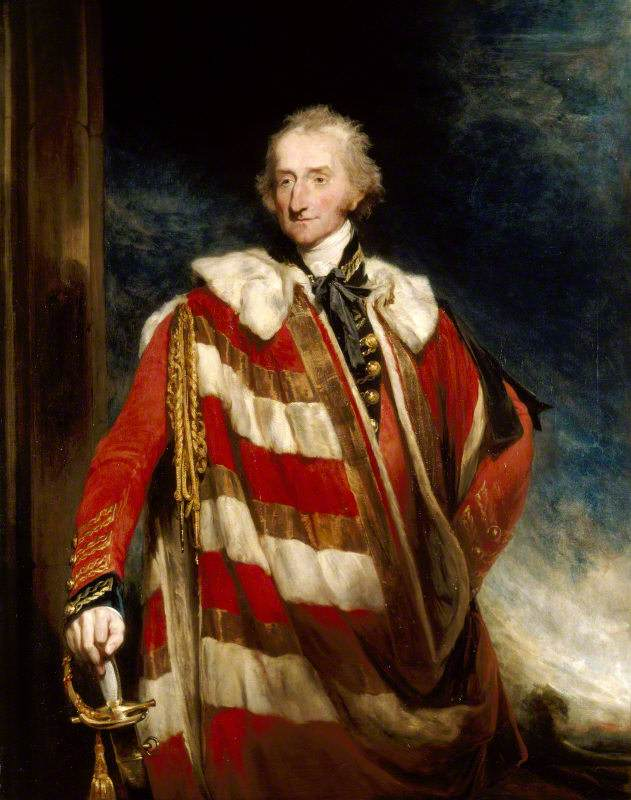
Portrait of the Earl of Bridgewater by William Owen

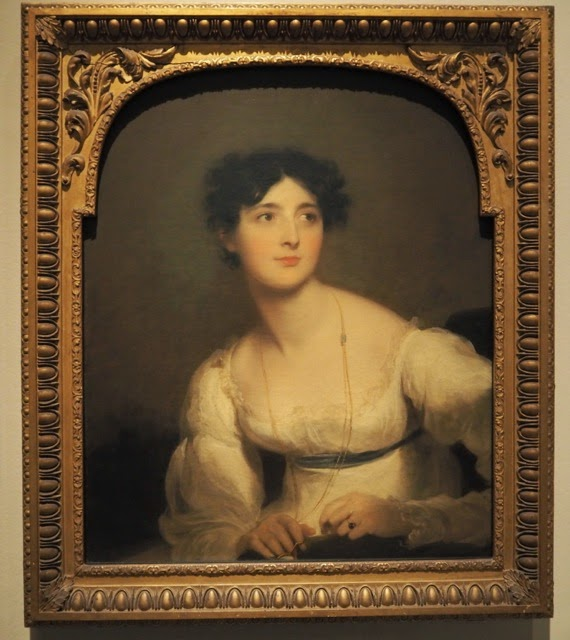
Portrait of Harriet Arbuthnot by Thomas Lawrence

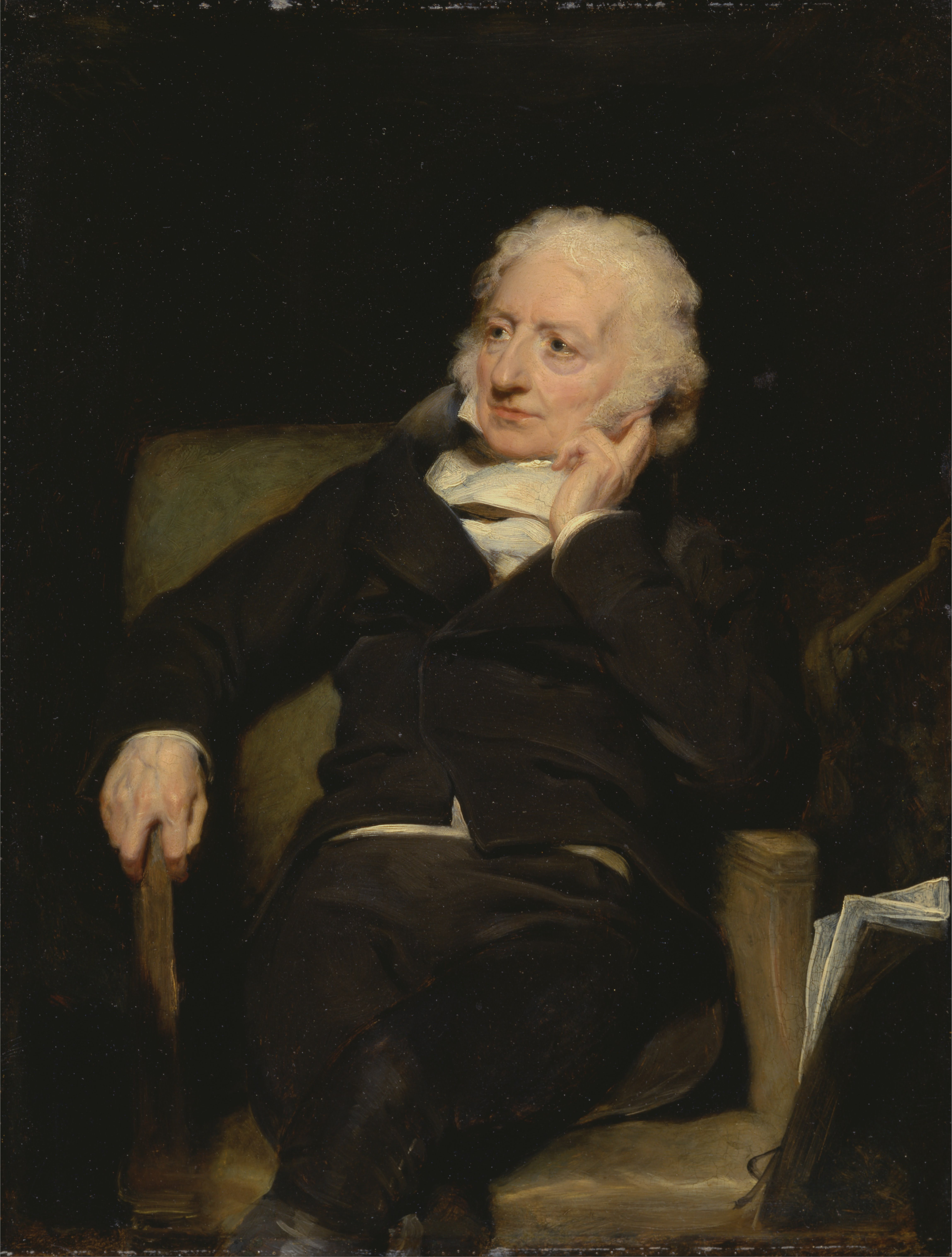
Portrait of Henry Fuseli by George Henry Harlow

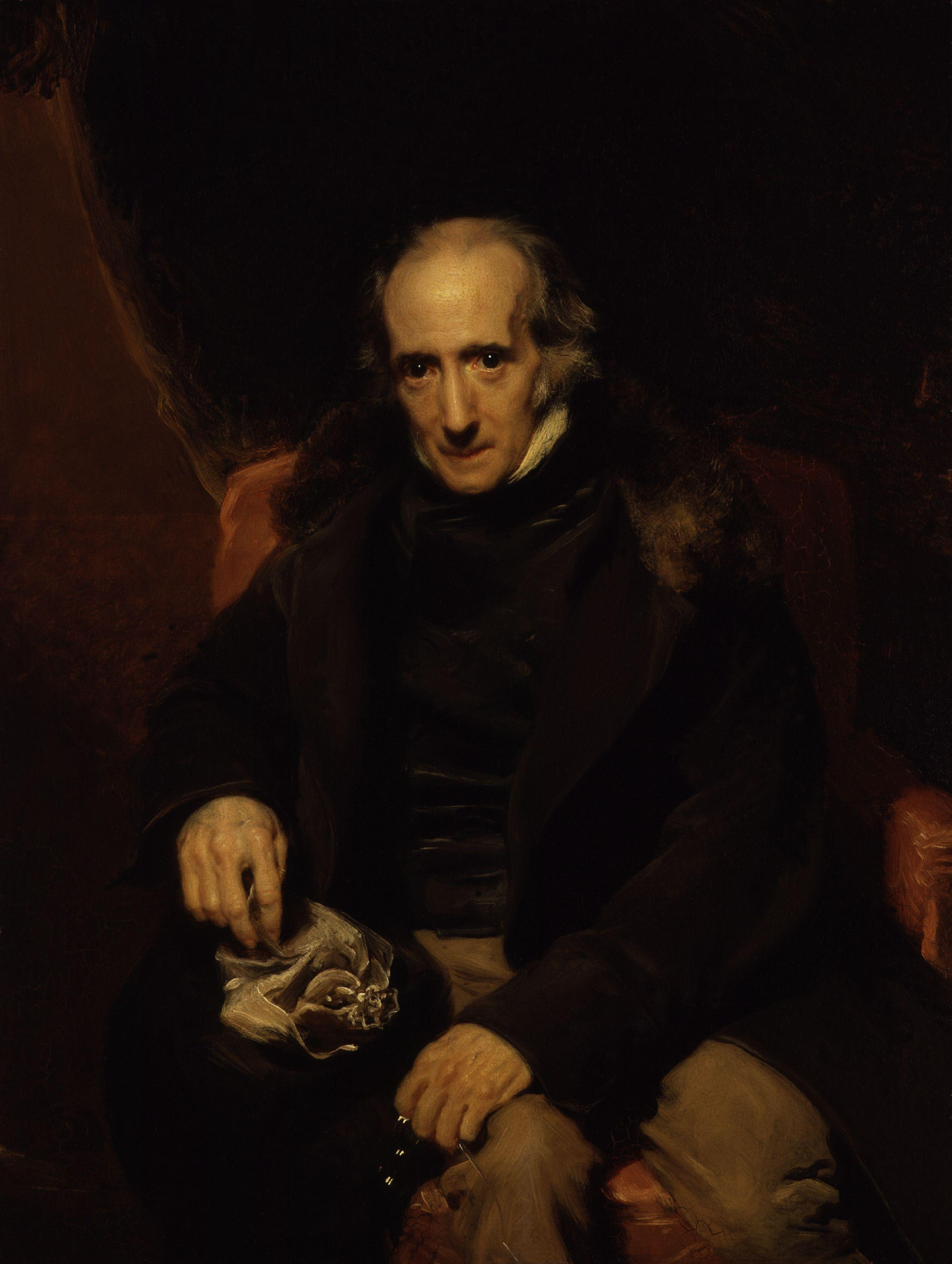
Portrait of James Northcote by George Henry Harlow

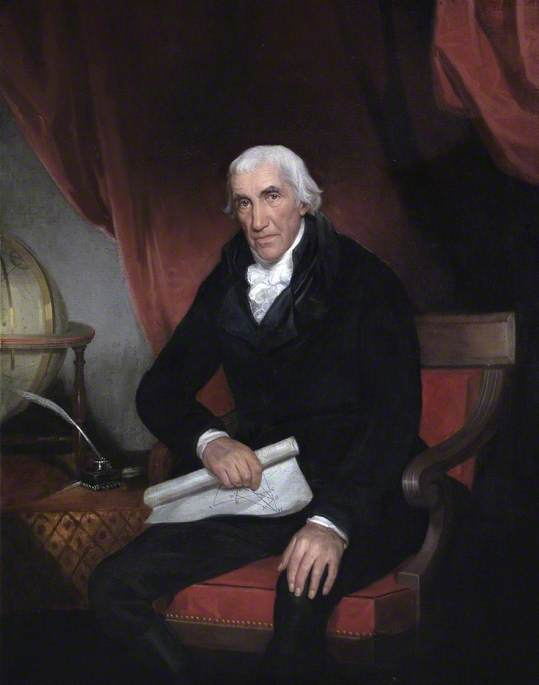
Portrait of Isaac Dalby by John James Halls

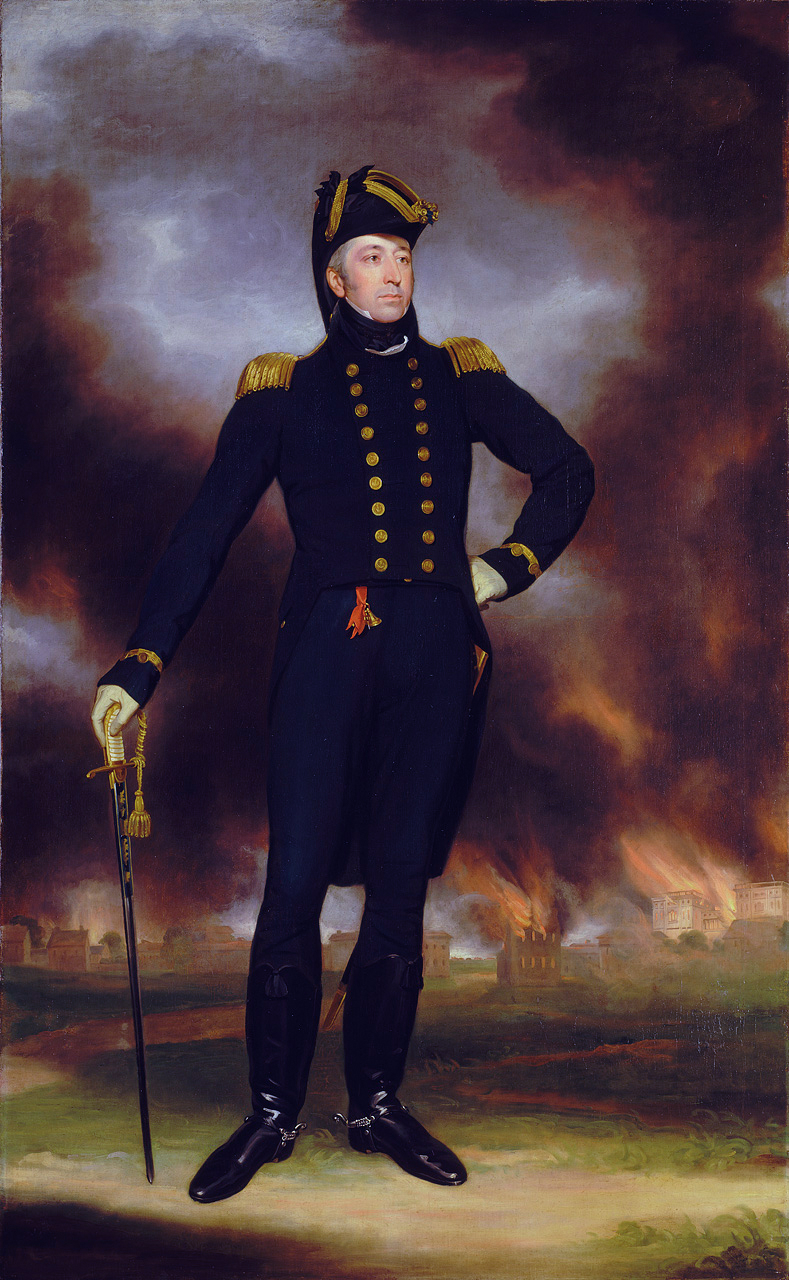
Portrait of George Cockburn by John James Halls

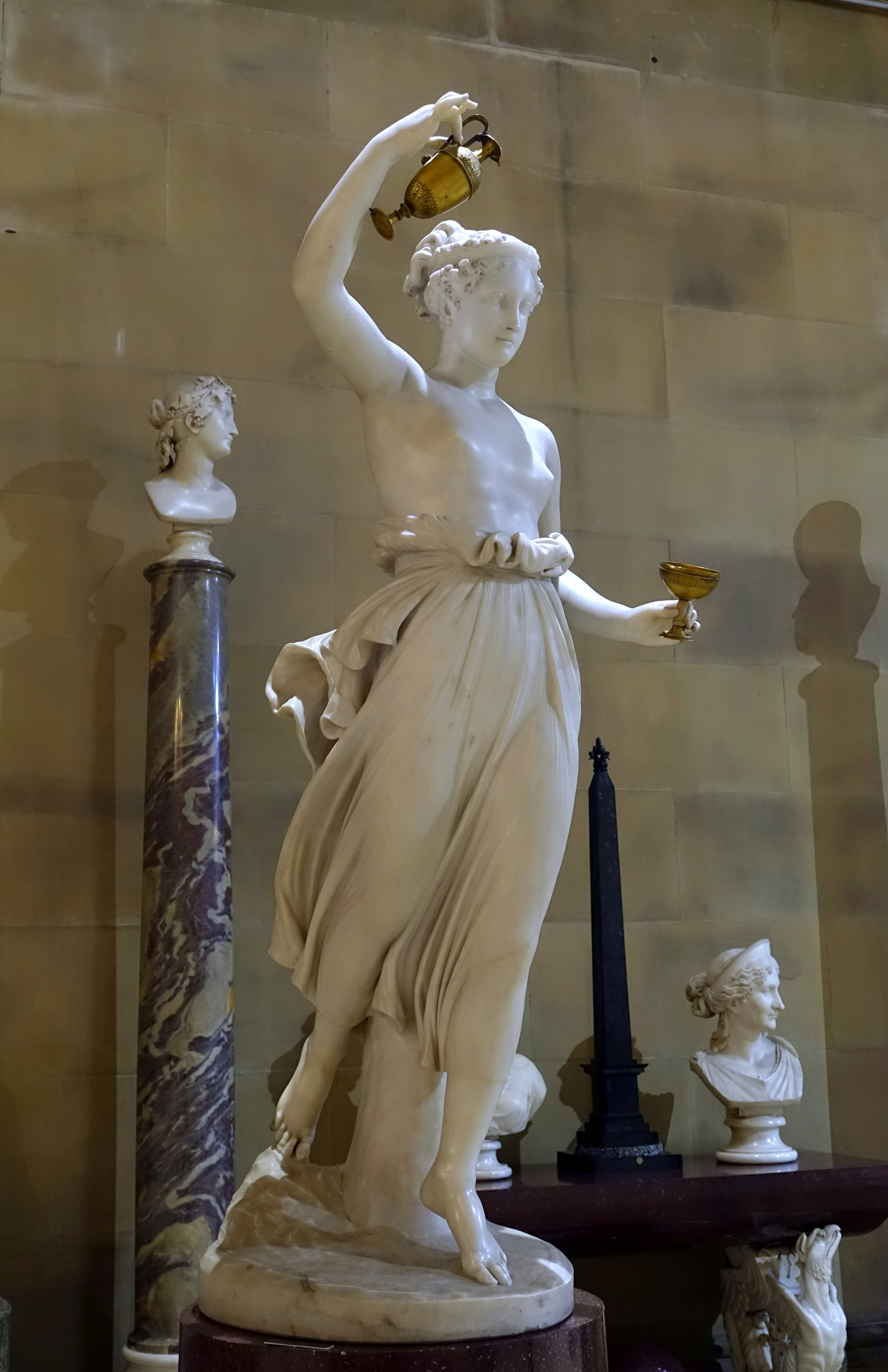
Hebe by Antonio Canova

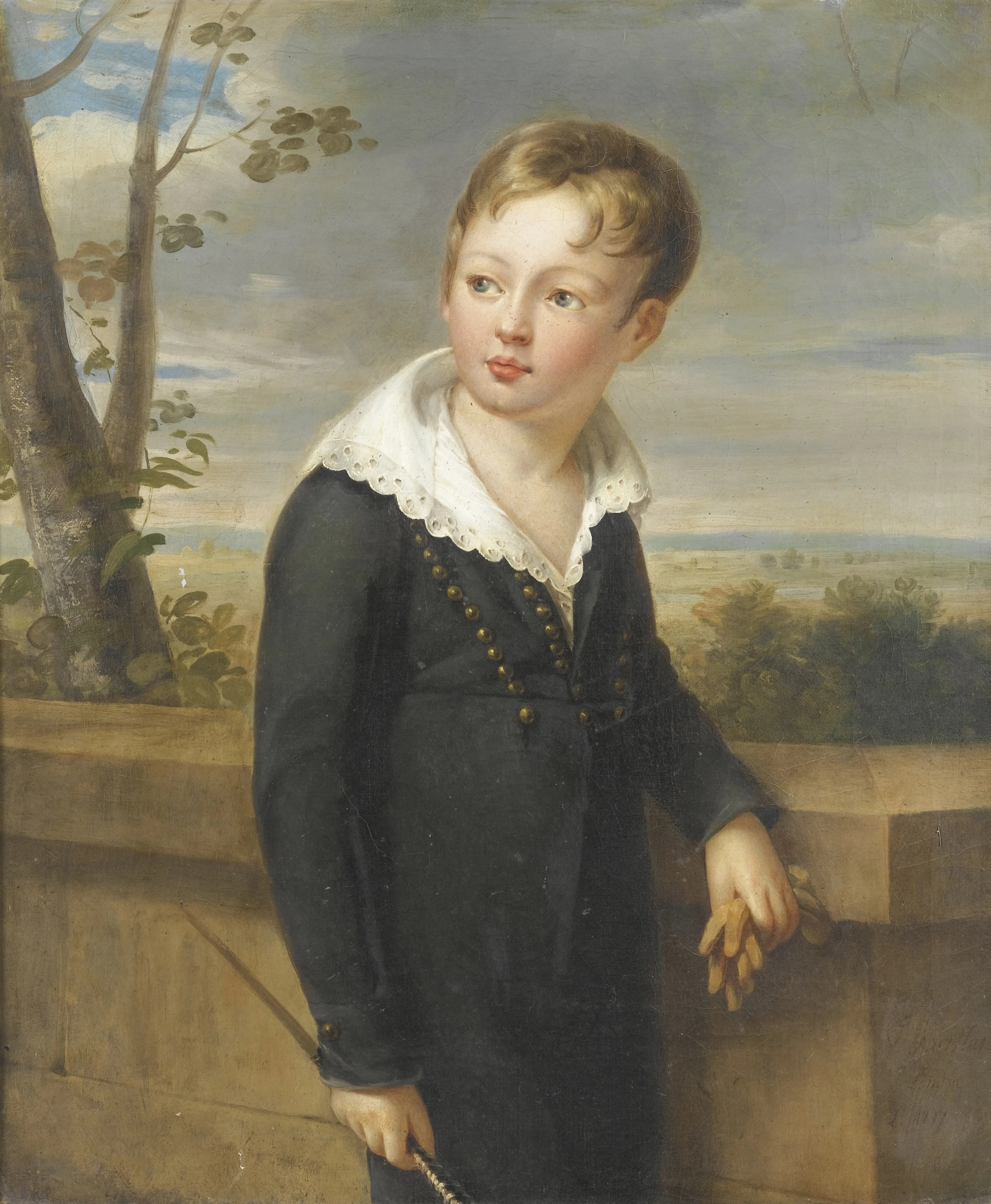
Portrait of the Duc de Chartres by Adèle Varillat

== Bibliography ==
- Bailey, Anthony. J.M.W. Turner: Standing in the Sun. Tate Enterprises Ltd, 2013.
- Hamilton, James. Turner - A Life. Sceptre, 1998.
- Levey, Michael. Sir Thomas Lawrence. Yale University Press, 2005.
- Reynolds, Graham. Constable's England. Metropolitan Museum of Art, 1983.
- Solkin, David H. Painting Out of the Ordinary: Modernity and the Art of Everyday Life in Early Nineteenth-century Britain. Yale University Press, 2009.
- Tromans, Nicholas. David Wilkie: The People's Painter. Edinburgh University Press, 2007.
