= Portrait of Thomas Graham =

1817 painting by Thomas Lawrence

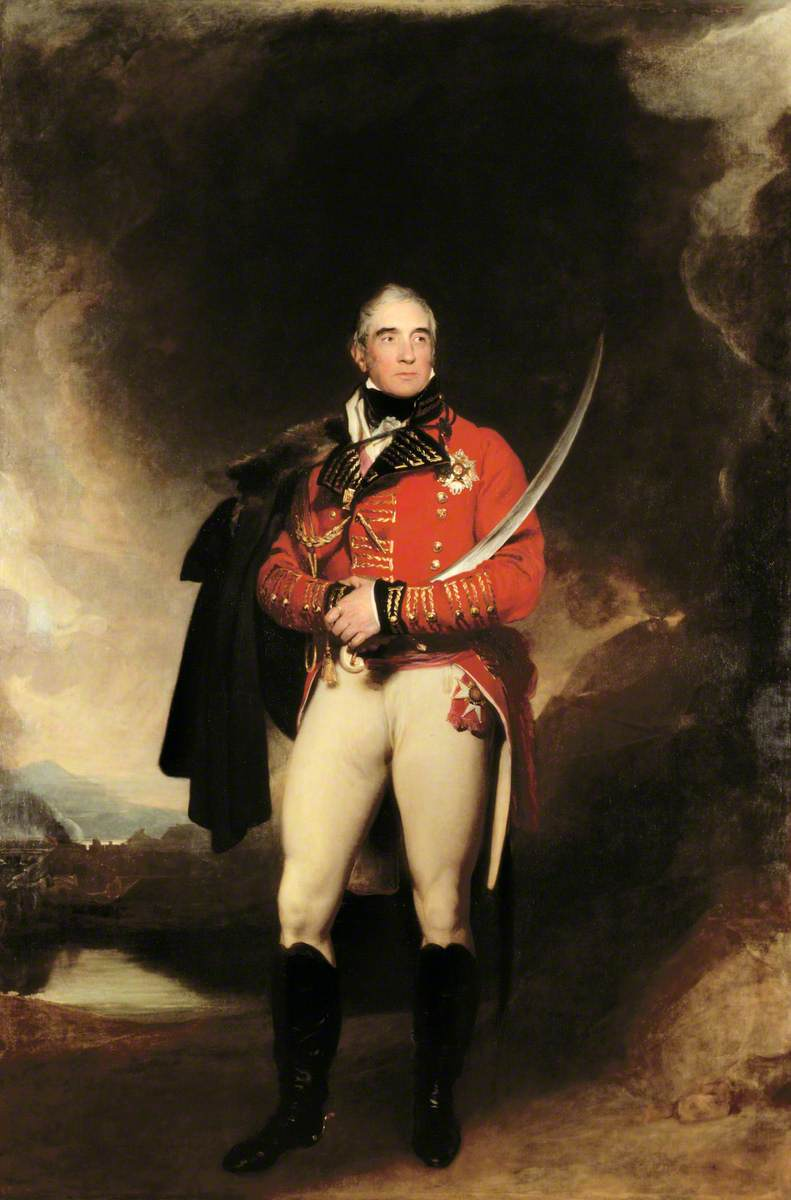
- Artist: Thomas Lawrence
- Year: 1817
- Type: Oil on canvas, portrait painting
- Dimensions: 236 cm × 146 cm (93 in × 57 in)
- Location: Apsley House, London

Portrait of Thomas Graham or Portrait of Lord Lydenoch is an 1817 portrait painting by the British artist Thomas Lawrence. It depicts the Scottish soldier Thomas s Graham. He is shown at full-length in uniform of a general of the British Army.

From 1808 to 1813 Graham served in the Peninsular War and rose to become second-in-command to the Duke of Wellington. Given an independent command he won the Battle of Barossa in March 1811 in an attempt to disrupt the French Siege of Cádiz. He commanded British forces during the Liberation of the Netherlands in 1813–14. He was made Baron Lydenoch in 1814 but is generally known by his earlier name.

Lawrence was the premier portrait painter of the Regency Era. The painting was displayed at the Royal Academy Exhibition of 1817 held at Somerset House in London. It now hangs in Apsley House, Wellington's historic residence in London. Another version of the painting is in the collection of Perth Art Gallery in Scotland.

Lawrence had produced an earlier portrait of Graham in 1813. While in his youth on the Grand Tour in Italy he had also sat for David Allan.

== Bibliography ==
- Brett-James, Anthony. General Graham, Lord Lynedoch. St. Martin's Press, 1959.
- Levey, Michael. Sir Thomas Lawrence. Yale University Press, 2005.
