= Portrait of Thomas Moore =

Painting by Martin Archer Shee

- Artist: Martin Archer Shee
- Year: c. 1817
- Type: Oil on canvas, portrait painting
- Dimensions: 91 cm × 70 cm (36 in × 28 in)
- Location: National Gallery of Ireland, Dublin

Portrait of Thomas Moore is an oil on canvas portrait painting by the Irish artist Martin Archer Shee, from c. 1817. It depicts the Irish writer Thomas Moore. It is held at the National Gallery of Ireland, in Dublin.

== History and description ==
Moore is shown seated, with books in front of him, and a monocle on his hand. He appears with a thoughtful expression. Both men were established celebrated figures in Regency Britain. A friend of Lord Byron, Moore was a noted figure of the romantic movement. He likely sat for the painting around the time he was completing his epic poem Lalla Rookh, published that year for which he was paid a thousand guineas.

Both men were Dublin-born Irish Catholics. Archer Shee was a prominent portraitist and occasional author, although at the time he was often ovedhadowed by his friend and rival Thomas Lawrence. In 1830 he succeeded Lawrence as President of the Royal Academy and held the position throughout the early years of the Victorian era.

The work was displayed at the Royal Academy Exhibition of 1817 at Somerset House in London. The painting was donated to the National Gallery of Ireland, in 1916. Several prints based on the painting were widely circulated, particularly as Moore was also famous for his Irish Melodies series. Notable versions were produced by William Thomas Fry, William Callis Roffe and John Burnet.

== Bibliography ==
- Bourke, Mary & Bhreathnach-Lynch, Síghle. Discover Irish Art at the National Gallery of Ireland. National Gallery of Ireland, 1999.
- Kelly, Ronan. Bard of Erin: The Life of Thomas Moore. Penguin Books, 2009
- Murray, Christopher John. Encyclopedia of the Romantic Era, 1760–1850, Volume 2. Taylor & Francis, 2004.
- Walker, Richard John Boileau. Regency Portraits, Volume 1. National Portrait Gallery, 1985.
