= Dominique Antoine Magaud =

French painter

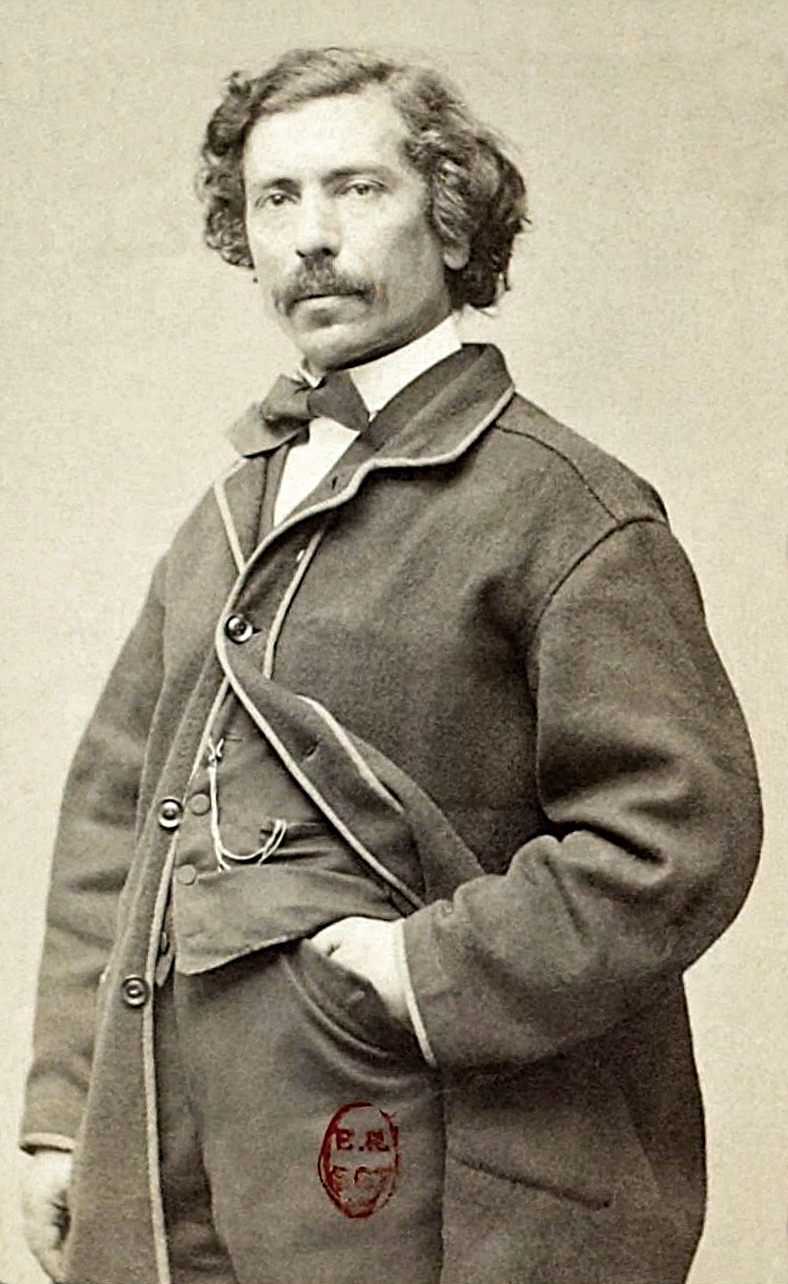
- Magaud in the 1860s
- Born: Dominique Antoine Jean-Baptiste Magaud; August 4, 1817; Marseille, France
- Died: December 23, 1899 (aged 82); Marseille, France
- Occupation: Painter

Dominique Antoine Jean-Baptiste Magaud (4 August 1817, Marseille - 23 December 1899, Marseille) was a French painter, muralist and art school director.

== Biography ==
He came from a middle-class family and began his career as a customs weigher for the Old Port of Marseilles. In 1839, he decided to start a new career and enrolled at the local art academy. After graduating, he completed his studies with Léon Cogniet at the École des Beaux-arts in Paris and remained there for a few years.

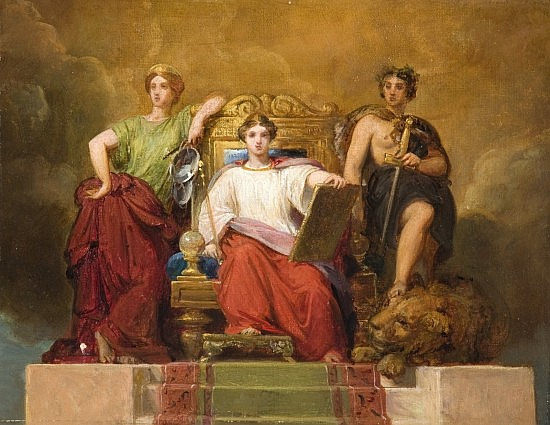
The Law, Between Force and Justice

When he returned to Marseille, he became a decorative painter, specializing in cafés. In 1853, his paintings of Amphitrite and Bacchus, on the ceiling at the "Café des Milles-Colonnes" (named after a famous establishment in Paris) secured his reputation. In 1858, he painted an allegorical scene of Marseille receiving the world's products at the "Café des Deux Mondes" and, in 1860, Cybele in a chariot pulled by lions, at the Grand Hôtel. All of this work has since disappeared.

During his work on these commercial enterprises, the Jesuits commissioned him to decorate the large meeting room at their Religious Association; a building originally occupied by the congregation of Saint Vincent de Paul, dating from 1643. It had recently been enlarged and remodeled under the direction of Marseille's chief architect, Pascal Coste. Magaud worked on this project from 1856 to 1864 and created fifteen murals that portrayed the contributions Catholicism had made to civilization. Among these were a scene of Columbus landing at San Salvador and one of Alessandro Volta contemplating God while in his laboratory. They were arranged around a large canvas, mounted on the ceiling, depicting the Virgin in heaven, surrounded by angels, which is now gone.

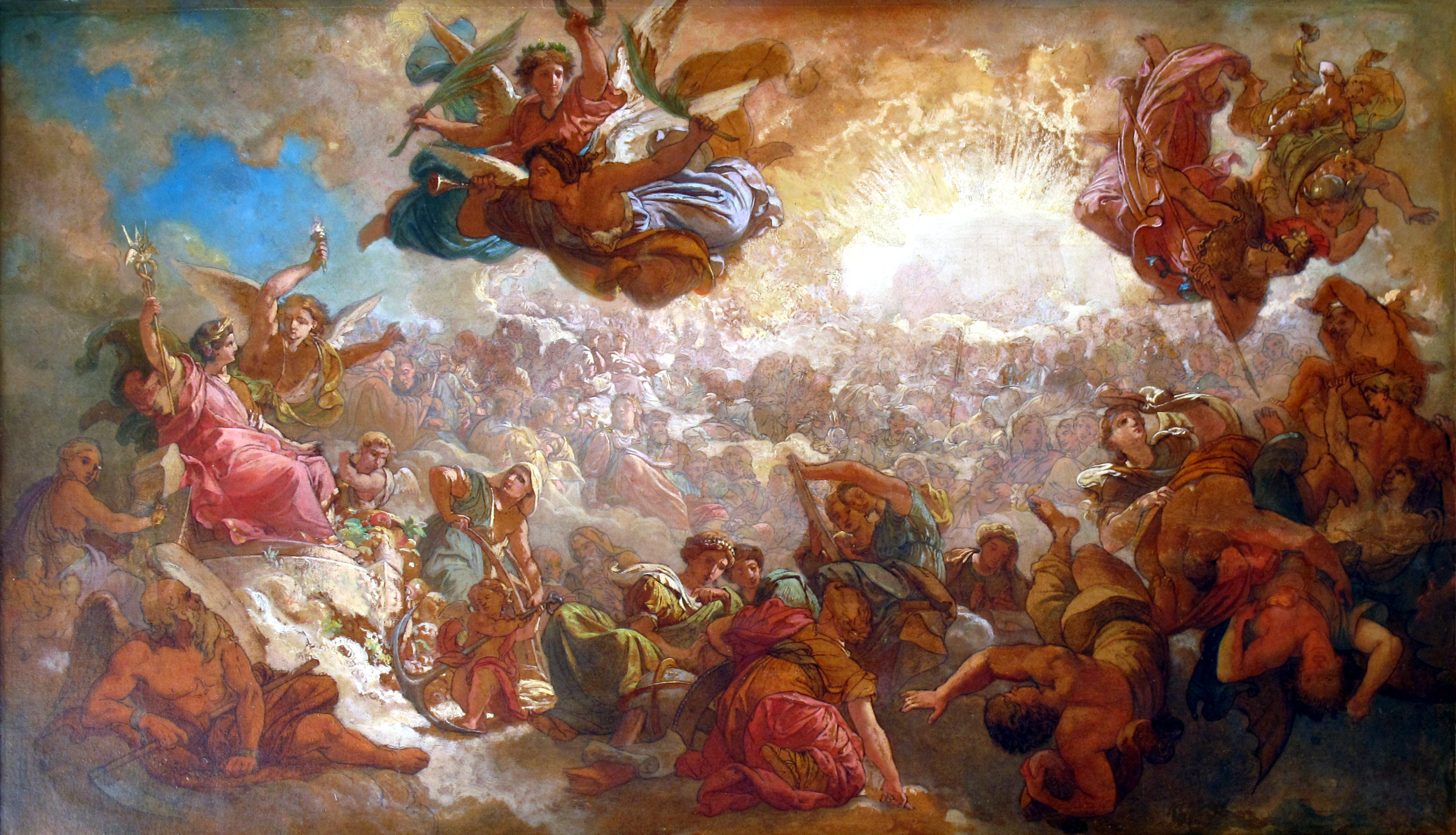
Study for the Apotheosis of the Great Men of Provence. The full mural was destroyed in 1944

Following this, he received a major commission from the Prefect, Charlemagne de Maupas, to decorate the new headquarters building for the Prefecture of Bouches-du-Rhône, which was still under construction. From 1865 to 1873, he created eight ceilings with allegorical subjects and thirty-two miscellaneous murals in the offices. While engaged in this massive project, the Chamber of Commerce enlisted him to take over the work of painting the ceiling in the Bourse. This painting, "L'Apothéose des grands hommes de Provence", was destroyed by a bombing in 1944.

In 1866, he was named a member of the Académie de Marseille and, three years later, was appointed director of his old alma mater, the "École des Beaux-Arts de Marseille". After completing work at the Bourse, he devoted himself almost entirely to the school. During his twenty-seven year tenure, the number of professors increased from three to eighteen. Two painters and five sculptors who had studied there won the Prix de Rome. In 1886, he became a Knight of the Légion d'Honneur. Just two years before his retirement, in 1894, he decorated the school's ballroom.
