= Fen Lane, East Bergholt =

Painting by John Constable

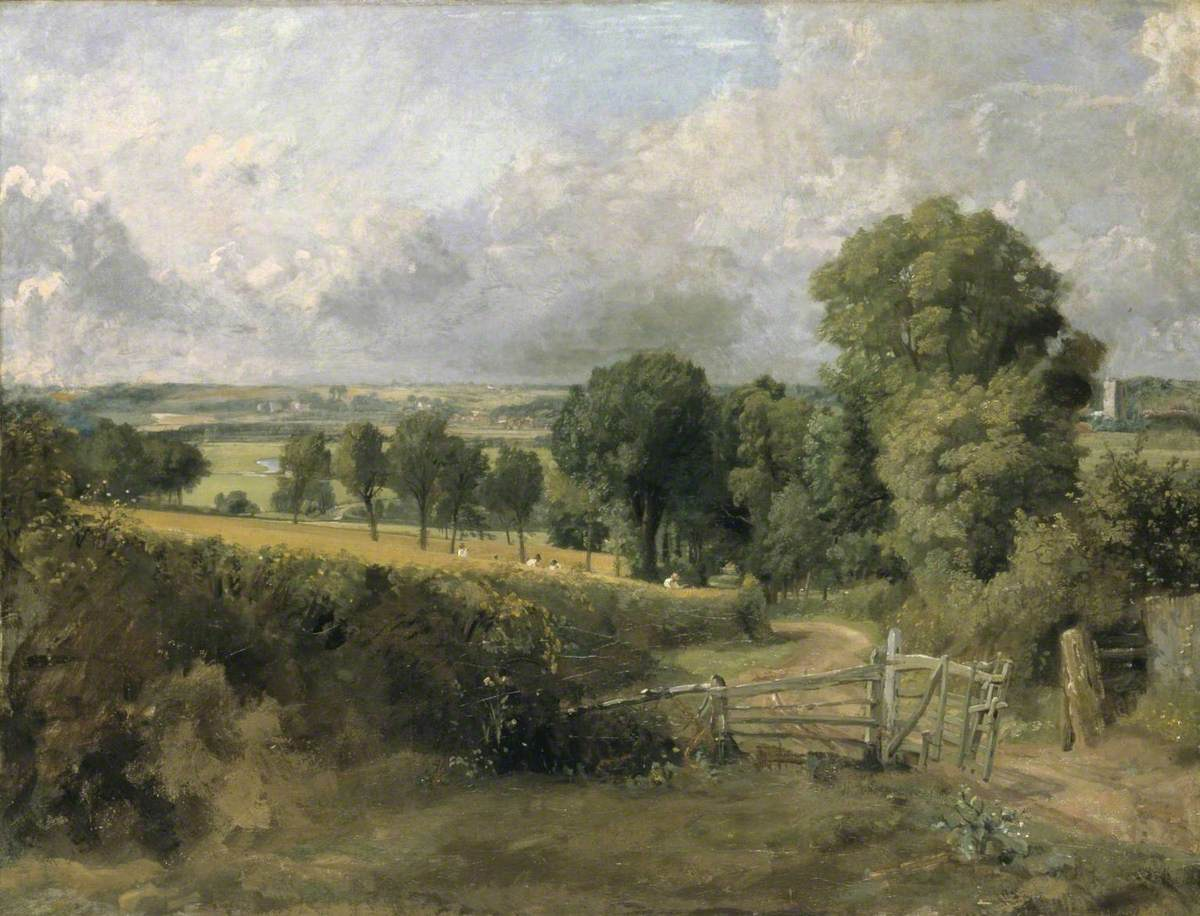
- Artist: John Constable
- Year: c.1817
- Type: Oil on canvas, landscape painting
- Dimensions: 69.2 cm × 92.5 cm (27.2 in × 36.4 in)
- Location: Tate Britain; London

Fen Lane, East Bergholt is an 1817 landscape painting by the British artist John Constable. It features a view near the village of East Bergholt in Constable Country. In the nearby field reapers are shown harvesting wheat.

It was produced during his visit to stay in the area with his new wife Maria. Constable possibly intended to complete the painting when he returned to London. It was left unfinished, with some parts of the canvas less detailed than others. The painting is now in the collection of the Tate Britain in Pimlico, which acquired it in 2002.

== See also ==
- List of paintings by John Constable

== Bibliography ==
- Bailey, Anthony. John Constable: A Kingdom of his Own. Random House, 2012.
- Cove, Sarah & Lyles, Anne. Constable: The Great Landscapes. Tate, 2006.
