= Entry of Henry IV into Paris =

Painting by François Gérard

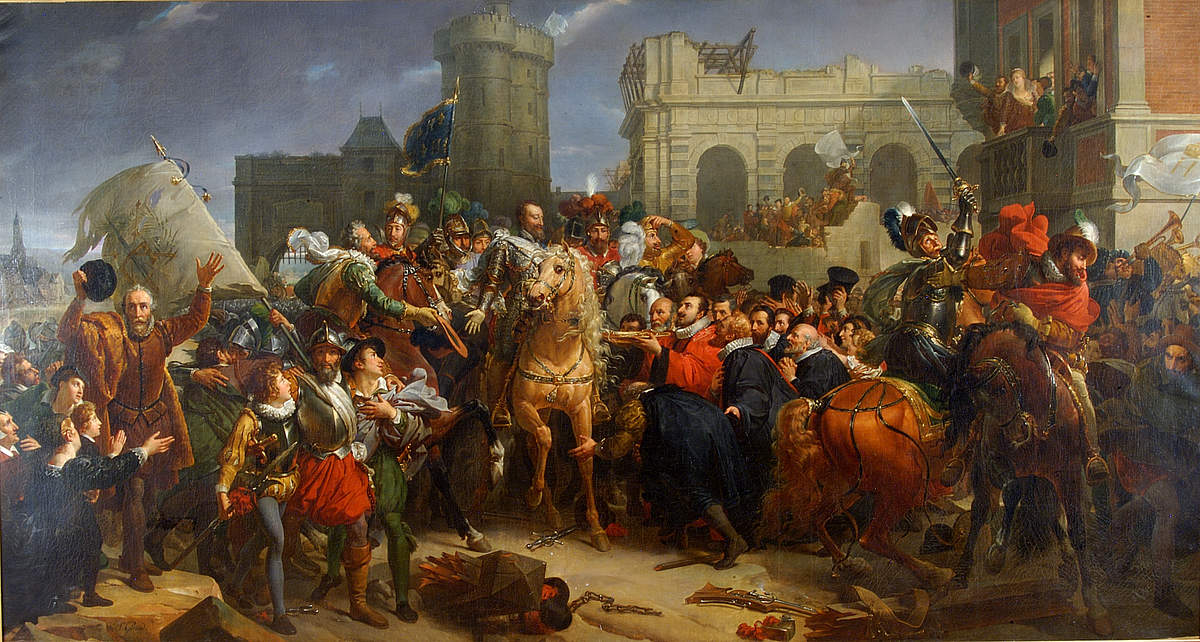
- Artist: François Gérard
- Year: 1817
- Type: Oil on canvas, history painting
- Dimensions: 510 cm × 958 cm (200 in × 377 in)
- Location: Palace of Versailles, Versailles

Entry of Henry IV into Paris (French: Entrée de Henri IV à Paris le 22 mars 1594) is an oil on canvas history painting by the French artist Francois Gérard, from 1817. It is held at the Galerie des Batailles, in the Palace of Versailles.

== History and description ==
It depicts Henry IV of France entering Paris for the first time as monarch on 22 March 1594. The king had converted to Catholicism and declared that "Paris is worth a mass" in an attempt to end the French Wars of Religion. A deliberate parallel was drawn with the restoration of Louis XVIII to the throne following the Hundred Days.

Accompanying the king on horseback are the Duke of Brissac, the Duke of Montmorency, Louis des Balbes de Berton de Crillon and Albert de Gondi. The Pont Neuf is seen in the background.

Although Gérard had enjoyed success during the Napoleonic era, he continued to flourish following the Bourbon Restoration of 1815. For the restored monarchy Henry IV held deep symbolism as the first member of the House of Bourbon to reign. The large work was commissioned by Louis XVIII for the Tuileries Palace. It was exhibited at the Paris Salon of 1817. It now hangs in the Galerie des Batailles at the Palace of Versailles.

== Bibliography ==
- Borowitz, Helen Osterman. The Impact of Art on French Literature: From de Scudéry to Proust. ISBN 0874132495. University of Delaware Press, 1985.
- Eitner, Lorenz. An Outline Of 19th Century European Painting: From David Through Cezanne. ISBN 0064302237. Routledge, 2021.
- Finley-Croswhite, S. Annette. Henry IV and the Towns: The Pursuit of Legitimacy in French Urban Society, 1589–1610. ISBN 0521620171. Cambridge University Press, 1999.
