= The Decline of the Carthaginian Empire =

Painting by J. M. W. Turner

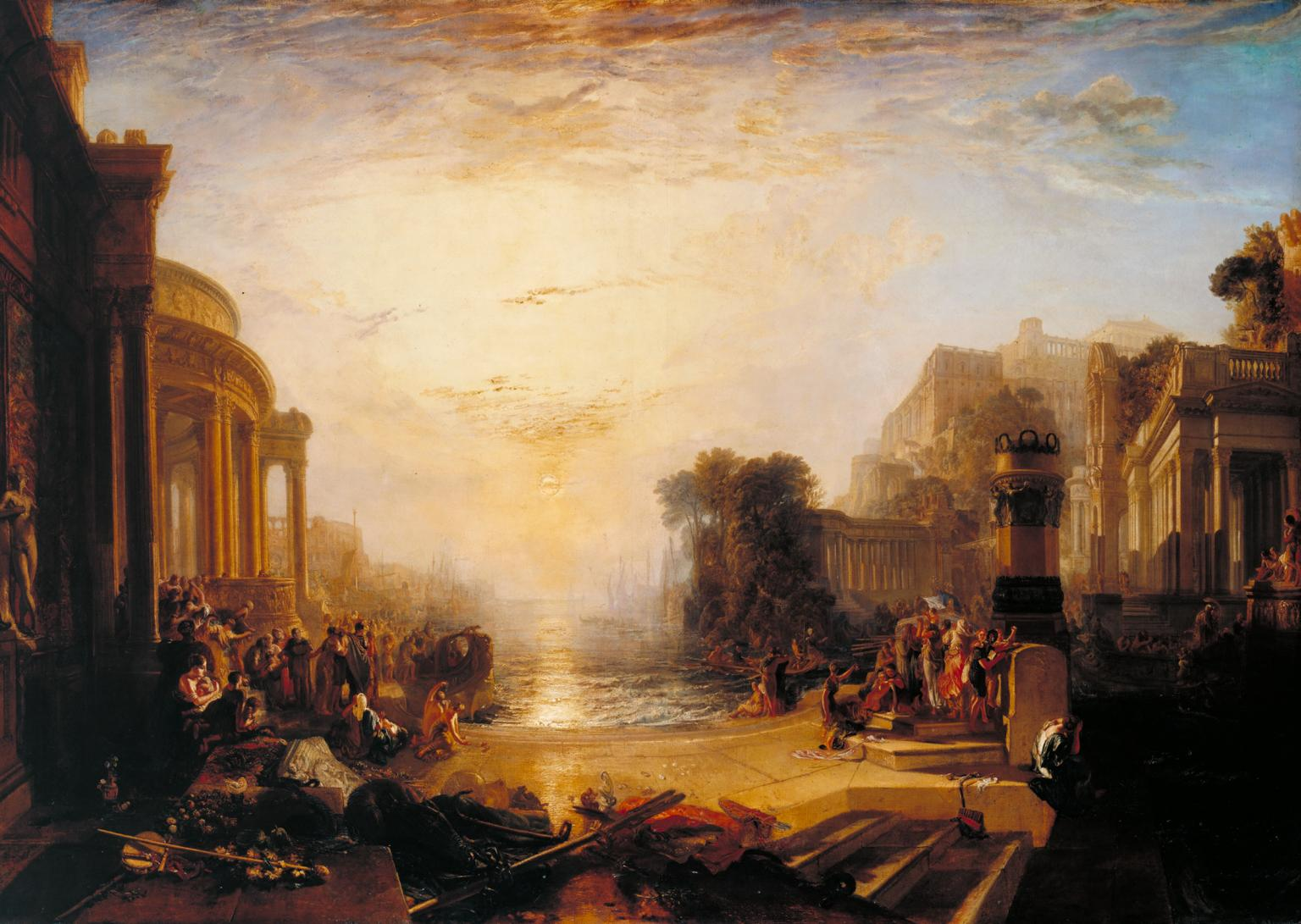
- Artist: J. M. W. Turner
- Year: 1817
- Type: Oil on canvas, history painting
- Dimensions: 170 cm × 239 cm (67 in × 94 in)
- Location: Tate Britain, London
- Website: www.tate.org.uk/...n00499

The Decline of the Carthaginian Empire is an 1817 history painting by the British artist William Turner. It shows the Sun setting on the city of Carthage, capital of Ancient Carthage. Carthage had been the major rival of the Roman Empire until its defeat in the Punic Wars. Turner intended to draw comparisons with Britain's recent defeat of its own major rival the French Empire during the Napoleonic Wars. Stylistically it is inspired by the work of the seventeenth century artist Claude Lorrain.

It is a companion piece to the artist's 1815 work Dido building Carthage portraying the mythical foundation of Carthage by Dido. The painting was exhibited at the Royal Academy's 1817 Summer Exhibition his only work on display that year. One review considered it "excelling in the higher qualities of art, mind and poetical conception, even Claude himself." Today it is the collection of the Tate Britain in Pimlico having been part of the Turner Bequest in 1856.

== See also ==
- List of paintings by J. M. W. Turner

== Bibliography ==
- Costello, Leo. J.M.W. Turner and the Subject of History. Taylor and Francis, 2017.
- Finley, Gerald. Angel in the Sun: Turner's Vision of History. McGill-Queen's Press, 1999.
- Hamilton, James. Turner - A Life. Sceptre, 1998.
- Quinn, Josephine. In Search of the Phoenicians. Princeton University Press, 2019.
