= An Arch of Westminster Bridge =

Painting by Samuel Scott

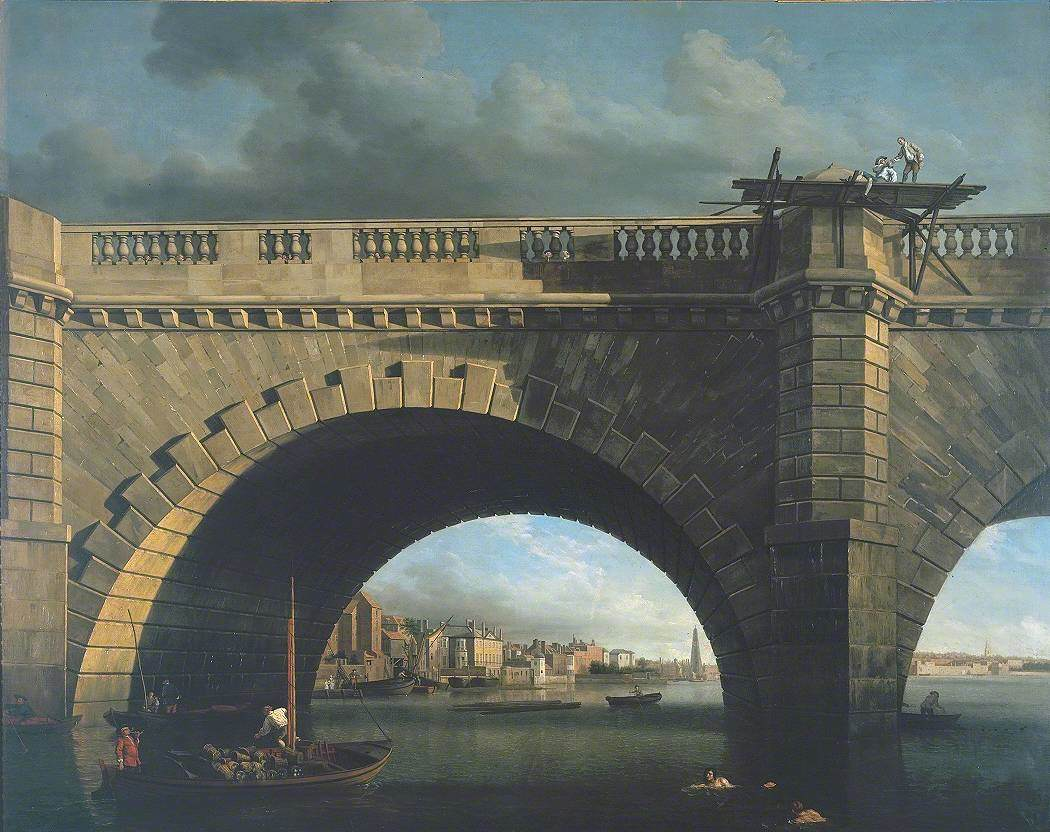
- Artist: Samuel Scott
- Year: c. 1750
- Type: Oil on canvas, landscape painting
- Dimensions: 135.7 cm × 163.8 cm (53.4 in × 64.5 in)
- Location: Tate Britain, London

An Arch of Westminster Bridge is an oil on canvas landscape painting by the English artist Samuel Scott, from c. 1750.

== History and description ==
Westminster Bridge had been constructed between 1739 and 1750 to the design of the Swiss architect Charles Labelye. It was only the second bridge to be built in London, and the engineering feat drew a number of artists including Canaletto and Richard Wilson. Scott himself had produced an earlier work The Building of Westminster Bridge in 1742. Having initially specialised in maritime art, Scott increasingly switched to cityscapes and riverscapes in response to the commercial success of Canaletto during his time in England. The view is towards the northern bank of the Thames in the direction of the City of London. Along with the various houses visible are the York Buildings Water Tower, the Savoy, Somerset House and St Mary-le-Strand.

It is often considered his masterpiece. Today it is part of the collection of the Tate Britain in Pimlico, having been acquired in 1970.

== Other versions ==
Scott produced several other versions including ones in the National Gallery of Ireland and the Yale Center for British Art

== See also ==
- London Seen Through an Arch of Westminster Bridge, a 1747 painting by Canaletto

== Bibliography ==
- Chilvers, Ian. The Oxford Dictionary of Art and Artists. Oxford University Press, 2015.
- Herrmann, Luke. British Landscape Painting of the Eighteenth Century. Oxford University Press, 1974.
- Tutton, Michael. Construction as Depicted in Western Art: From Antiquity to the Photograph. Amsterdam University Press, 2021.
