= 1742 in art =

Events from the year 1742 in art.

== Events ==
- Canaletto paints in England.

== Works ==
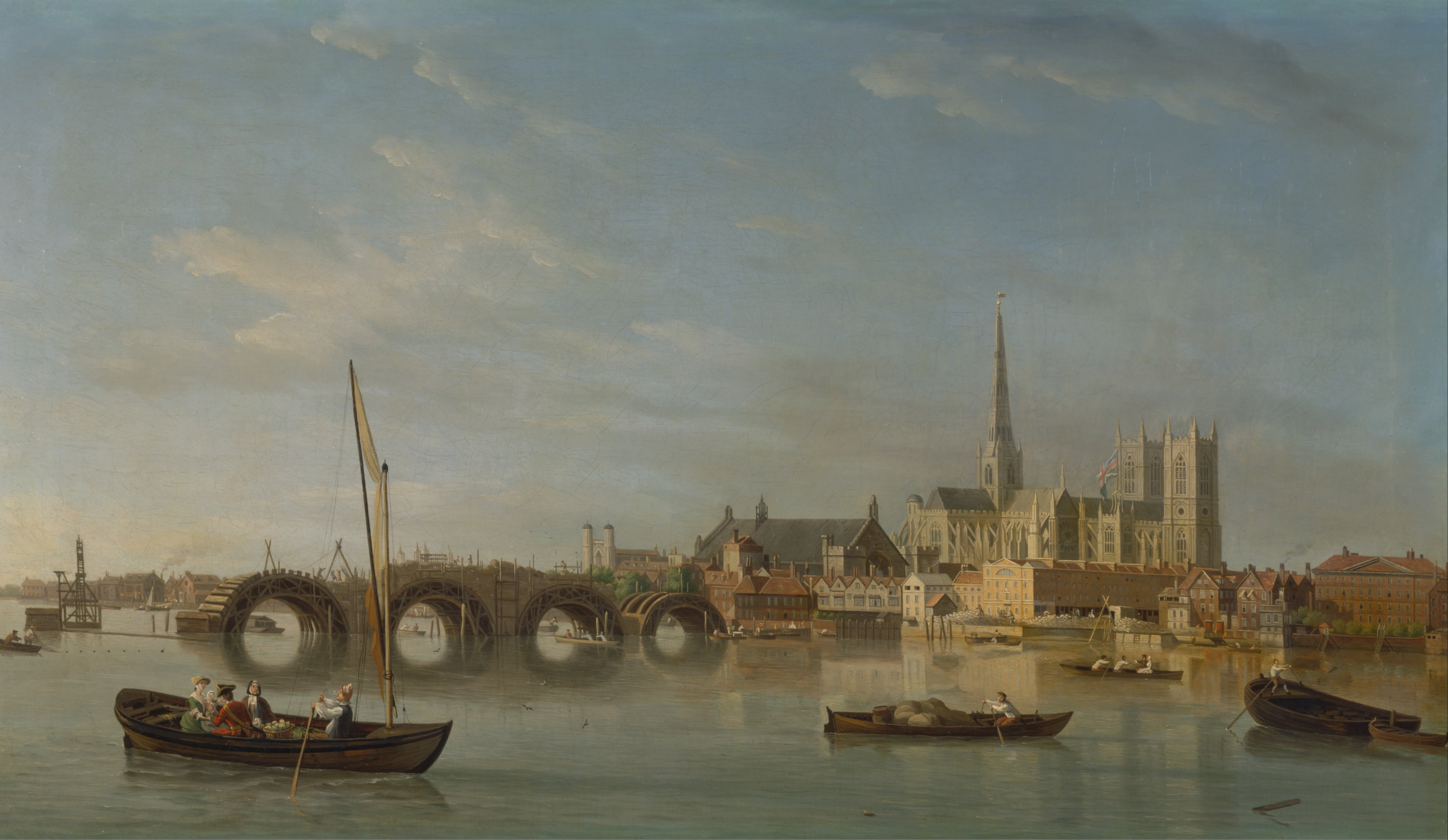
The Building of Westminster Bridge by Samuel Scott

- François Boucher – Diana Leaving her Bath
- Canaletto
  - The Porta Portello, Padua (1741–1742) (National Gallery of Art, Washington D.C.)
  - Rome: The Arch of Constantine (British Royal Collection, Windsor Castle)
  - Rome: The Arch of Septimius Severus (British Royal Collection, Windsor Castle)
  - Rome: The Arch of Titus (British Royal Collection, Windsor Castle)
  - Rome: The Pantheon (British Royal Collection, Windsor Castle)
  - Rome: Ruins of the Forum looking towards the Capitol (British Royal Collection, Windsor Castle)
- William Hogarth (paintings)
  - Miss Mary Edwards
  - Portrait of Theodore Jacobsen
  - Taste in High Life (engraved in 1746)
- Vincenzo Meucci – Glory of Florentine Saints (fresco on interior of dome, basilica of San Lorenzo, Florence)
- Jacques Saly – Portrait bust of Emanuel Pinto de Fonseca, Grand Master of the Order of the Maltese Cross
- Samuel Scott – The Building of Westminster Bridge

== Births ==
- February 15 – Yves-Marie Le Gouaz, French engraver (died 1816)
- April 24 – Richard Crosse, English painter of portrait miniatures (died 1810)
- July 12 – Jurriaan Andriessen, Dutch decorative painter (died 1819)
- September 8 – Ozias Humphrey, English painter of portrait miniatures (died 1810)
- September 26 – Thomas Jones, Welsh artist of watercolours and sketches (died 1803)
- November 5 – Richard Cosway, British miniaturist (died 1821)
- date unknown
  - John Edwards, English botanist, painter, designer and illustrator (died 1815)
  - Kim Eung-hwan, Korean painter of the late Joseon period (died 1789)
  - John Kay, caricaturist (died 1826)

== Deaths ==
- March 13 – Gilles-Marie Oppenordt, French designer (born 1672)
- June 9 – Simone Brentana, Italian painter, active in Verona (born 1656)
- July 19 – Jan Baptist Xavery, Flemish sculptor active in the Netherlands (born 1697)
- December 3 – Claude Aubriet, illustrator and botanical artist (born 1651)
- date unknown – Faustino Bocchi, Italian painter, active in Brescia, who specialized in bizarre paintings of dwarfs (born 1659)
- probable – Eleazar Albin, naturalist and illustrator
