= 1815 in art =

Events in the year 1815 in art.

== Events ==
- April 22 – English portrait painter Thomas Lawrence is knighted.
- May 1 – The Royal Academy Exhibition of 1815 opens in at Somerset House. It features portraits by Thomas Lawrence of the Duke of Wellington and Marshal Blucher who will triumph at the Battle of Waterloo before the exhibition closes on June 24.
- August 15 – The first of James Pollard's mail coach paintings are engraved and published as aquatints in Britain.
- unknown date
  - Rebuilding of the Royal Pavilion by John Nash begins in Brighton, England.
  - The unfinished Waterloo Vase is presented to the Prince Regent of the United Kingdom; the prince commissions sculptor Richard Westmacott to complete it.
  - Beginning of Biedermeier period in the European arts.
  - Académie Suisse, an informal art school, is established in Paris by artists' model Martin Suisse.

== Works ==
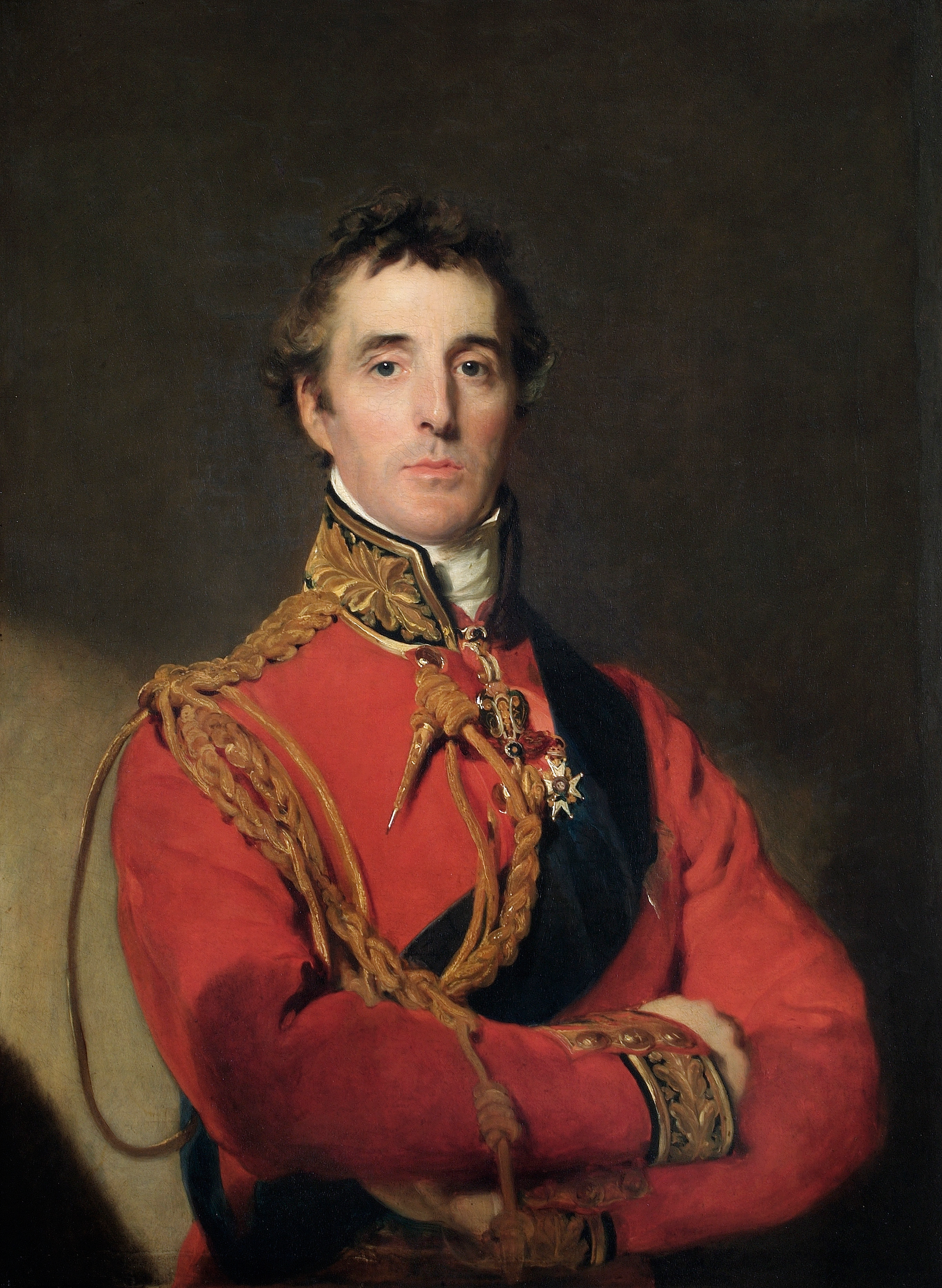
The Duke of Wellington by Thomas Lawrence.

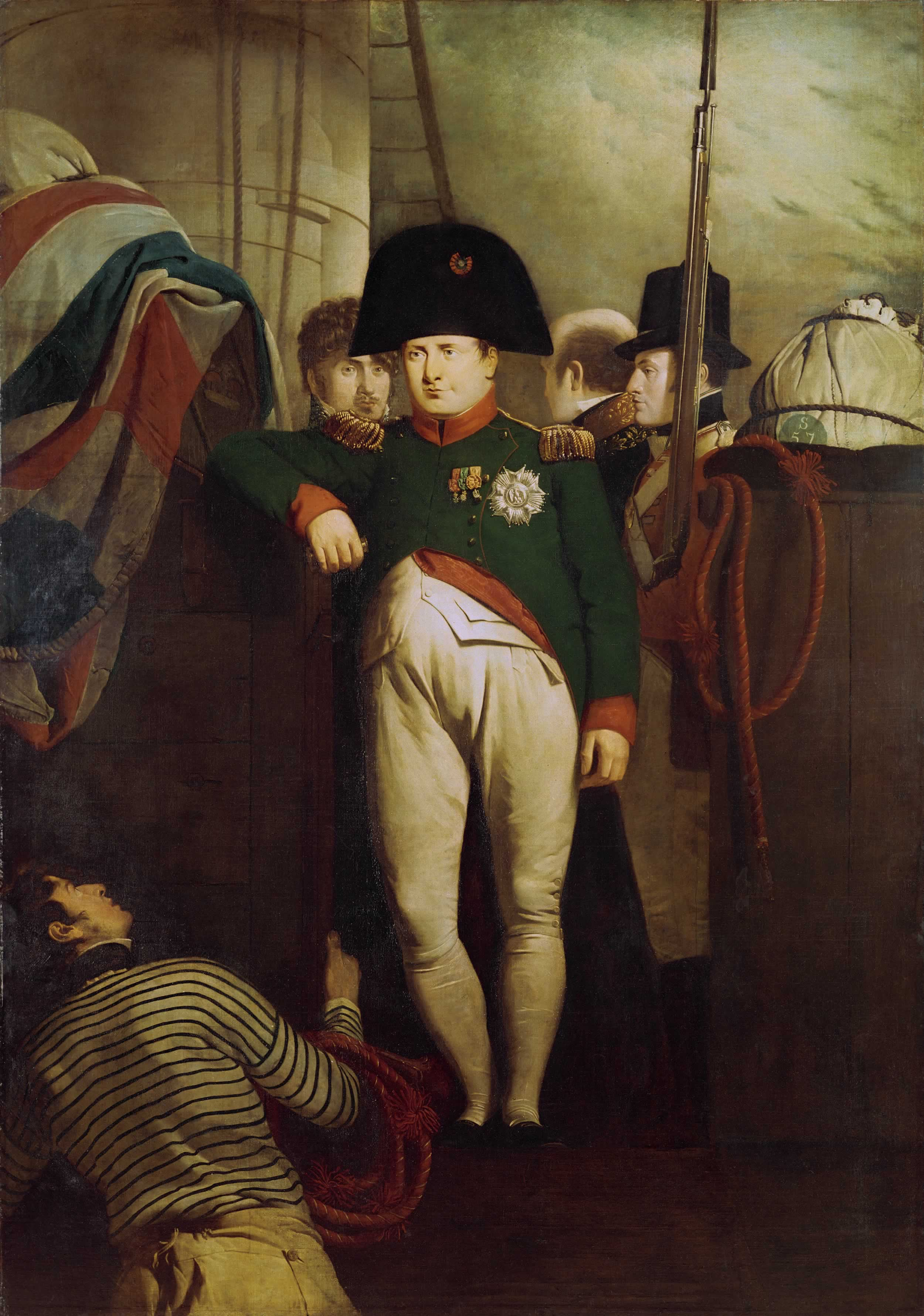
Napoleon on the Bellerophon by Charles Lock Eastlake.

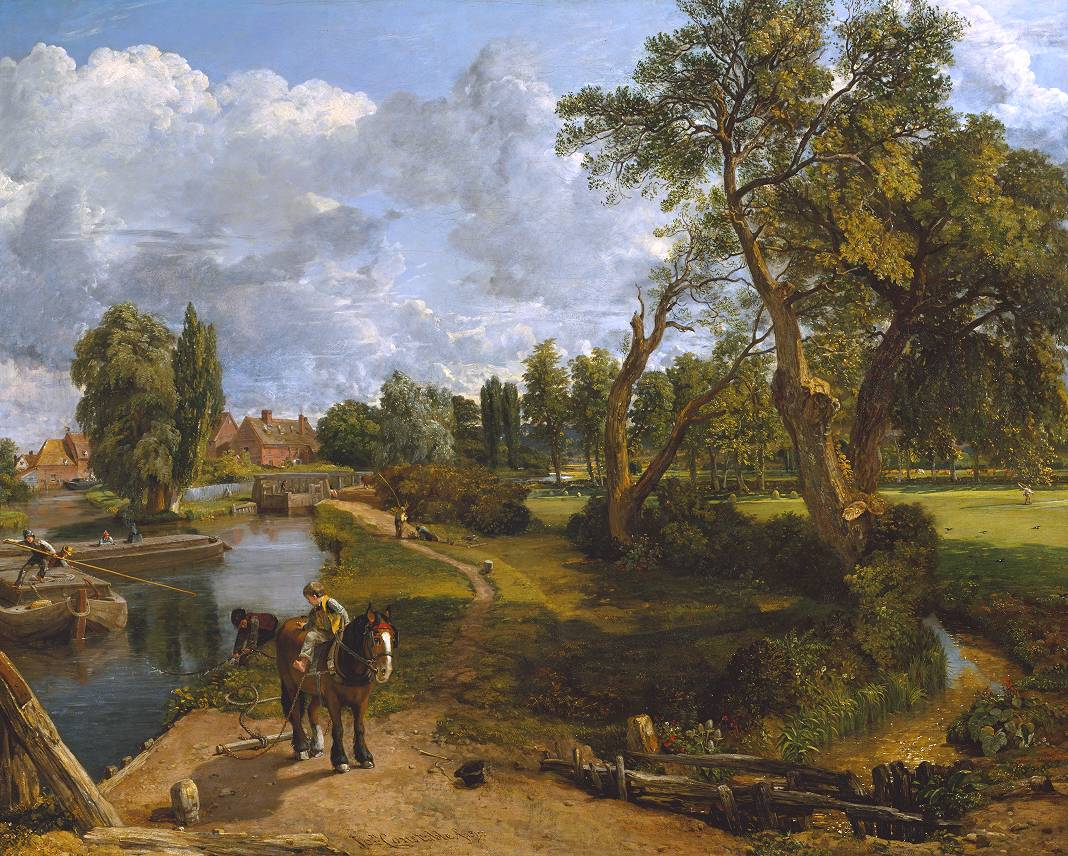
Boat-Building Near Flatford Mill by John Constable.

- William Beechey
  - Portrait of Harriet Mellon
  - Portrait of Lord Beresford
  - Portrait of Thomas Picton
- Edward Bird – The Departure to London
- Vincenzo Chilone – The Return of the Horses of San Marco
- William Collins – Shrimp Boys at Cromer
- John Constable
  - Brightwell Church and Village
  - Boat-Building Near Flatford Mill
- Abraham Cooper – Marshal Blucher at the Battle of Ligny
- Denis Dighton – The Defence of Hougoumont
- Charles Lock Eastlake – Napoleon on the Bellerophon
- Francisco Goya
  - The Junta of the Philippines
  - Portrait of Ferdinand VII
  - Self-portrait at 69
  - Tauromaquia
- George Jones – The Prince Regent Received by the University and City of Oxford
- Orest Kiprensky – Portrait of Vasily Zhukovsky
- Thomas Lawrence
  - Portrait of the Duke of Wellington (Apsley House)(
  - Portrait of the Duke of Wellington (Waterloo Chamber)
- Charles Robert Leslie – The Murder of Rutland by Lord Clifford
- J. M. W. Turner
  - Crossing the Brook
  - Dido Building Carthage, or, The Rise of the Carthaginian Empire
- David Wilkie – Distraining for Rent

== Births ==
- February 15 – Eugène-Louis Lequesne, French sculptor (died 1887)
- February 18 – Baron Leys, Belgian painter (died 1869)
- February 21 – Jean-Louis-Ernest Meissonier, French Classicist painter and sculptor (died 1891)
- March 15 – Dimitrije Avramović, eminent Serbian painter of icons and frescoes (died 1855)
- May 19 – Thomas Thornycroft, English sculptor (died 1885)
- June 11 – Julia Margaret Cameron, née Pattle, Indian-born British photographer (died 1879)
- July 12 – Hablot Knight Browne ("Phiz"), English illustrator (died 1882)
- September 1 – Emma Stebbins, American sculptor (died 1882)
- November 15 – John Banvard, American panorama painter (died 1891)
- December 8 – Adolph Menzel, German painter and engraver (died 1905)
- December 21 – Thomas Couture, French painter and art teacher (died 1879)
- date unknown
  - Carlos Luis de Ribera y Fieve, Spanish painter, son of Juan Antonio Ribera (died 1891)
  - Thomas Stuart Smith, Scottish painter (died 1869)

== Deaths ==
- March 7 – Francesco Bartolozzi, Italian engraver (born 1725)
- May 28 – Charlotta Cedercreutz, Swedish painter and noblewoman (born 1736)
- June 1 – James Gillray, British caricaturist (born c.1756)
- June 28 – Torii Kiyonaga, Japanese ukiyo-e printmaker and painter of the Torii school (born 1752)
- August 31 – John Edwards, English botanist, painter, designer and illustrator (born 1742)
- September 9 – John Singleton Copley, American painter (born 1738)
- November 9
  - Samuel Alken, English sculptor and engraver (born 1756)
  - Giuseppe Bossi, Italian painter, arts administrator and writer on art (born 1777)
- December 31 – Thomas Burke, Irish engraver and painter (born 1749)
- date unknown
  - Johann Christian Eberlein, German painter (born 1770)
  - Emma Körner, German painter (born 1788)
