= Brightwell, Suffolk =

Village and civil parish in England

Coordinates: 52.0433°N 1.2790°E

Brightwell

- Location within Suffolk
- Population: 57 (2001 census)
- Civil parish: Brightwell
- District: East Suffolk
- Shire county: Suffolk
- Region: East
- Country: England
- Sovereign state: United Kingdom
- Post town: IPSWICH
- Postcode district: IP10
- Police: Suffolk
- Fire: Suffolk
- Ambulance: East of England
- UK Parliament: Suffolk Coastal
- Website: http://www.brightwell.suffolk.gov.uk//

Brightwell is a village and civil parish in the East Suffolk district, in the English county of Suffolk. It is located 7 miles east of Ipswich and 4 miles south west of Woodbridge. Adjacent parishes include Foxhall, Bucklesham, Martlesham and Newbourne. There is the A12 road nearby.

It has a church dedicated to St John the Baptist.

== History ==
In the fifteenth century Brightwell Manor was possessed by William Curzon. His son, Sir Robert Curson, Knt., created a Baron of the Holy Roman Empire by the Emperor Maximilian for his gallantry against the Turks, was a Yorkist conspirator and declared a traitor in 1501, although was later back in favour at the English Court. It is possible that Brightwell was forfeited by him in 1501 as he is thereafter referred to as "of Ipswich". Brightwell Hall was extensively remodelled about 1663 by Sir Samuel Barnardiston MP, leader of the Suffolk Whigs and a deputy Governor of the East India Company. It was demolished in about 1755 but traces of the park's parterres and garden walks still remain.

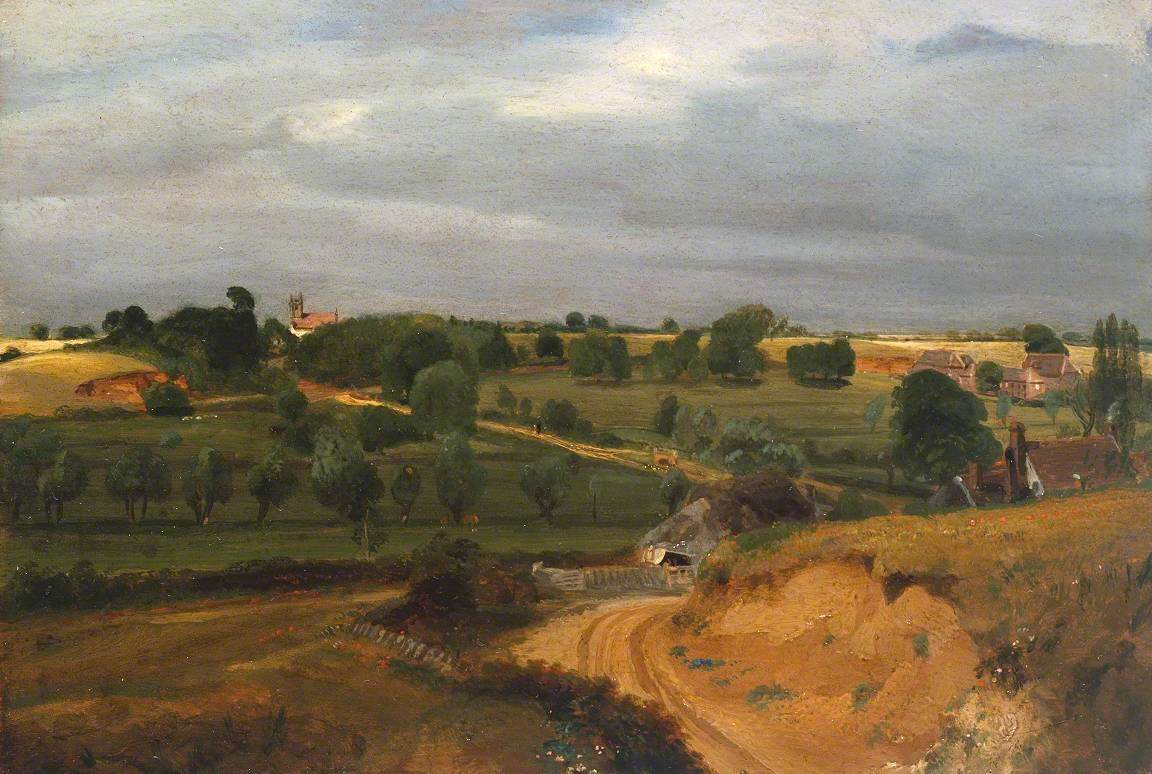
Brightwell Church and Village by John Constable

John Constable painted a landscape in oil in 1815 of Brightwell.

== Population ==
The population at the 2011 Census was only minimal and was included in the civil parish of Foxhall.
