= Westminster Bridge =

Bridge over the River Thames in London

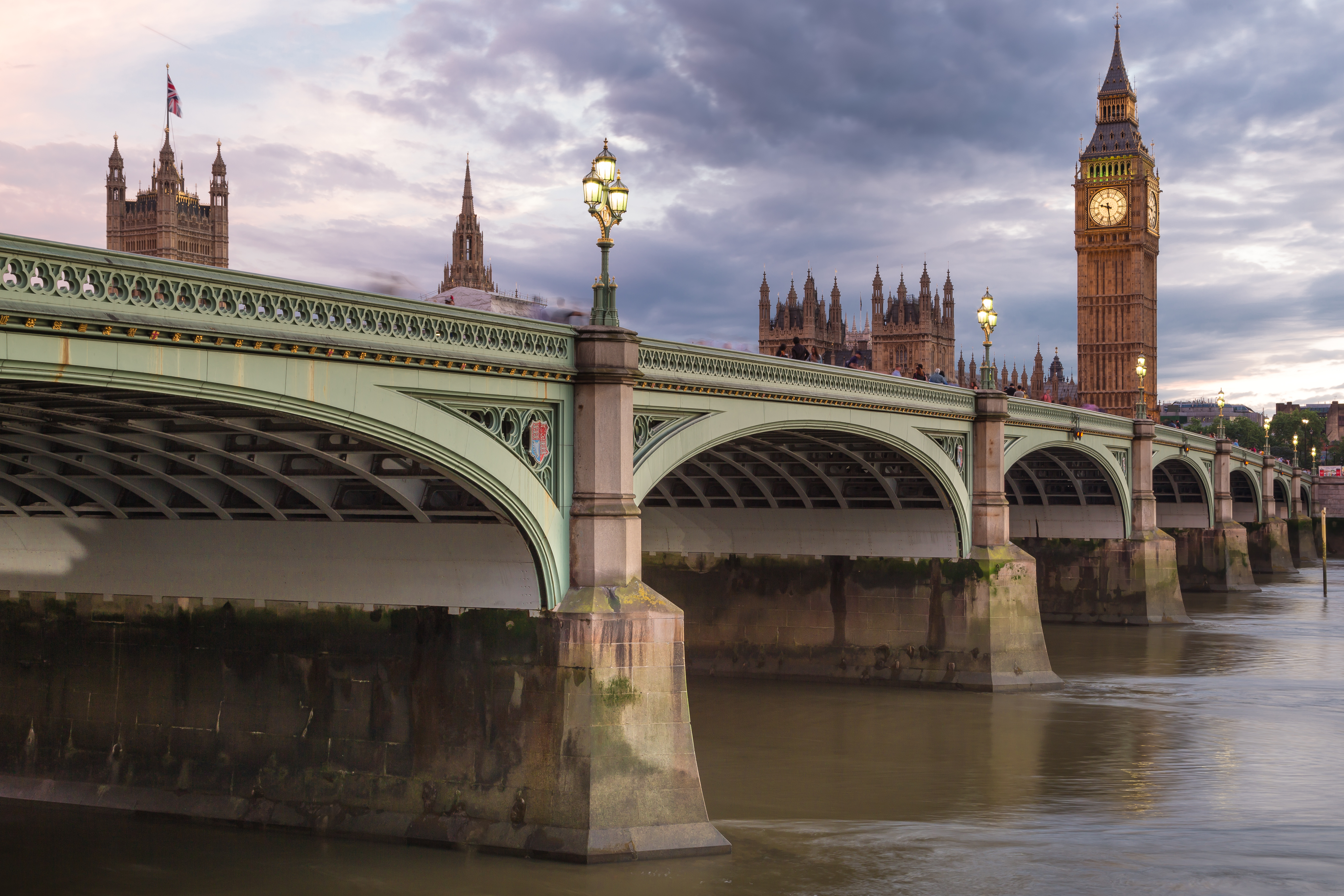
- Coordinates: 51°30′03″N 0°07′19″W
- Carries: A302 road
- Crosses: River Thames
- Locale: London
- Maintained by: Transport for London
- Heritage status: Grade II* listed structure
- Preceded by: Lambeth Bridge
- Followed by: Hungerford Bridge & Golden Jubilee Bridges

Characteristics
- Design: Arch bridge
- Total length: 820 feet (250 m)
- Width: 85 feet (26 m)
- No. of spans: 7

History
- Designer: Thomas Page
- Opened: 18 November 1750; 275 years ago (first bridge); 24 May 1862; 164 years ago (second bridge)

Location
- Interactive map of Westminster Bridge

Westminster Bridge is a road-and-foot-traffic bridge crossing over the River Thames in London, linking Westminster on the west side and Lambeth on the east side.

The bridge is painted predominantly green, the same colour as the leather seats in the House of Commons which is on the side of the Palace of Westminster nearest to the bridge, but a natural shade similar to verdigris. This is in contrast to Lambeth Bridge, which is red, the same colour as the seats in the House of Lords and is on the opposite side of the Houses of Parliament.

In 2005–2007, it underwent a complete refurbishment, including replacing the iron fascias and repainting the whole bridge. It links the Palace of Westminster on the west side of the river with County Hall and the London Eye on the east and was the finishing point during the early years of the London Marathon.

The next bridge downstream is the Hungerford Bridge & Golden Jubilee Bridges and upstream is Lambeth Bridge. Westminster Bridge was designated a Grade II* listed structure in 1981.

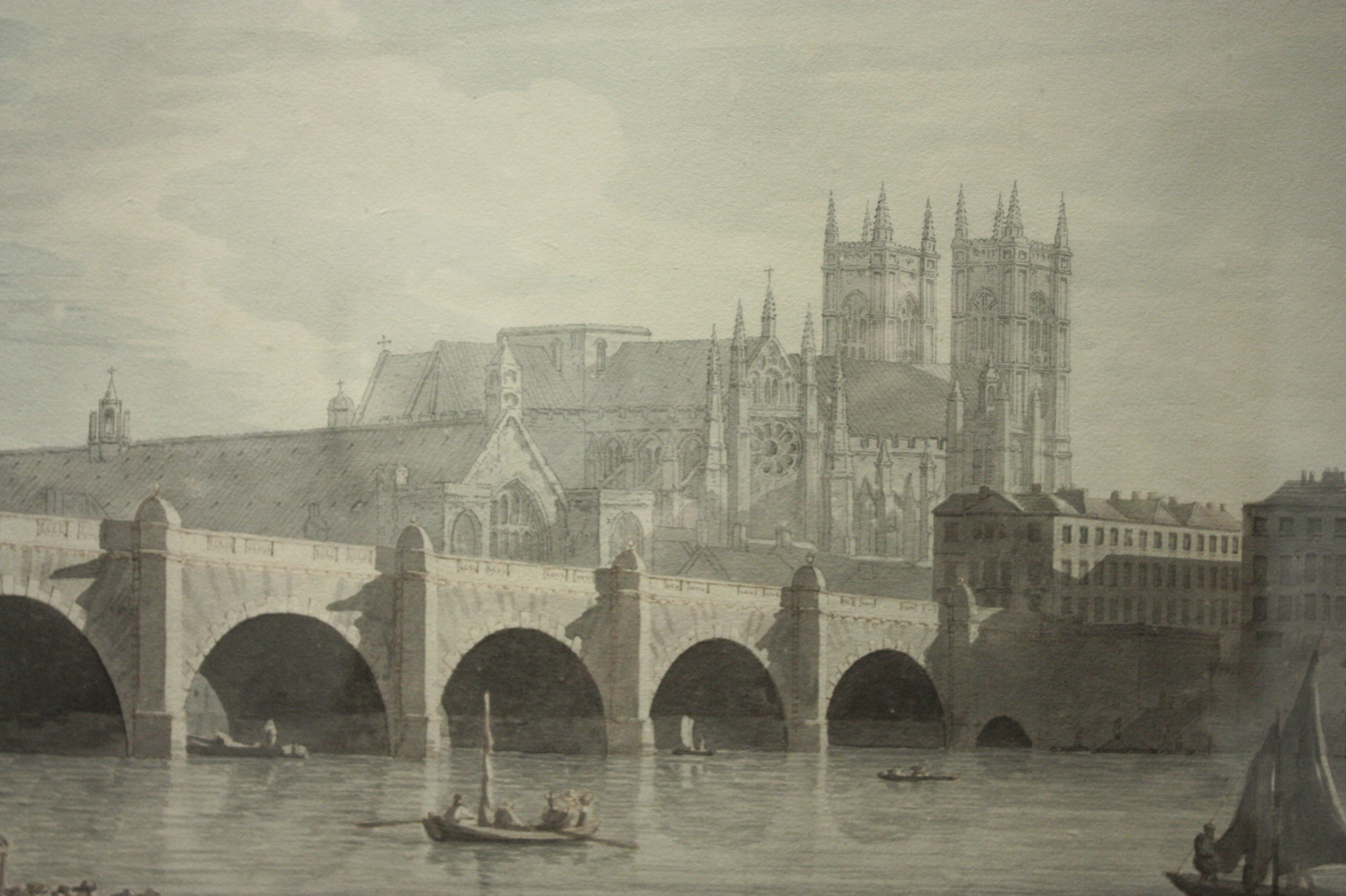
Westminster Bridge by Joseph Farrington, 1789 (the original bridge)

== History ==
Westminster Bridge Act 1735
- Act of Parliament
- Parliament of Great Britain
- Long title: An Act for building a Bridge cross the River Thames, from The New Palace Yard, in the City of Westminster, to the opposite Shore in the County of Surrey.
- Citation: 9 Geo. 2. c. 29
- Territorial extent: Great Britain

Dates
- Royal assent: 20 May 1736
- Commencement: 15 January 1736 (Note: Start of session.)
- Repealed: 4 August 1853
Other legislation
Amended by	Westminster Bridge Act 1736
Repealed by	Westminster Bridge Act 1853

Status: Repealed

Text of statute as originally enacted

Westminster Bridge Act 1736
- Act of Parliament
- Parliament of Great Britain
- Long title: An Act for explaining and amending an Act passed in the Ninth Year of the Reign of His present Majesty, intituled, "An Act for building a Bridge cross the River Thames, from The New Palace Yard, in the City of Westminster, to the opposite Shore, in the County of Surrey."
- Citation: 10 Geo. 2. c. 16
- Territorial extent: Great Britain

Dates
- Royal assent: 21 June 1737
- Commencement: 1 February 1737
- Repealed: 4 August 1853
Other legislation
Amends	Westminster Bridge Act 1735
Repealed by	Westminster Bridge Act 1853
Relates to	Westminster Bridge Act 1737

Status: Repealed

Text of statute as originally enacted

Westminster Bridge Act 1737
- Act of Parliament
- Parliament of Great Britain
- Long title: An Act for building a Bridge cross the River Thames, from the Woolstaple, or thereabouts, in the Parish of Saint Margaret, in the City of Westminster, to the opposite Shore, in the County of Surrey.
- Citation: 11 Geo. 2. c. 25
- Territorial extent: Great Britain

Dates
- Royal assent: 20 May 1738
- Commencement: 24 January 1738
- Repealed: 4 August 1853
Other legislation
Repealed by	Westminster Bridge Act 1853
Relates to	Westminster Bridge Act 1736

Status: Repealed

Text of statute as originally enacted

Westminster Bridge Act 1738
- Act of Parliament
- Parliament of Great Britain
- Long title: An Act to enlarge the Powers of the Commissioners for building a Bridge cross the River Thames, from The Woolstaple, or thereabouts, in the Parish of Saint Margaret, in the City of Westminster, to the opposite Shore, in the County of Surrey; and to enable them, by a Lottery, to raise Money, for the several Purposes therein mentioned; and to enlarge the Time for exchanging Tickets unclaimed in the last Lottery for the said Bridge; and to make Provision for Tickets in the said Lottery, lost, burnt, or otherwise destroyed.
- Citation: 12 Geo. 2. c. 33
- Territorial extent: Great Britain

Dates
- Royal assent: 13 June 1739
- Commencement: 1 February 1739
- Repealed: 4 August 1853
Other legislation
Repealed by	Westminster Bridge Act 1853
Relates to	Westminster Bridge Act 1741

Status: Repealed

Text of statute as originally enacted

Westminster Bridge Act 1739
- Act of Parliament
- Parliament of Great Britain
- Long title: An Act to give further Powers to the Commissioners for building a Bridge cross the River Thames, from the City of Westminster to the opposite Shore in the County of Surrey; and to enable them to raise a further Sum of Money, towards finishing the said Bridge, and to perform the other Trusts reposed in them.
- Citation: 13 Geo. 2. c. 16
- Territorial extent: Great Britain

Dates
- Royal assent: 29 April 1740
- Commencement: 15 November 1739
- Repealed: 4 August 1853
Other legislation
Repealed by	Westminster Bridge Act 1853

Status: Repealed

Text of statute as originally enacted

Westminster Bridge Act 1740
- Act of Parliament
- Parliament of Great Britain
- Long title: An Act to enable the Commissioners for building a Bridge cross the River Thames, from the City of Westminster, to the opposite Shore in the County of Surrey, to raise a further Sum of Money, towards finishing the said Bridge, and to perform the other Trusts reposed in them; and for exchanging of Tickets unclaimed in the Westminster Bridge Lottery of the Twelfth Year of His present Majesty's Reign; and for making Provision for Tickets in the said Lottery, lost, burnt, or otherwise destroyed.
- Citation: 14 Geo. 2. c. 40
- Territorial extent: Great Britain

Dates
- Royal assent: 25 April 1741
- Commencement: 18 November 1740
- Repealed: 4 August 1853
Other legislation
Repealed by	Westminster Bridge Act 1853
Relates to	Westminster Bridge Act 1741

Status: Repealed

Text of statute as originally enacted

Westminster Bridge Act 1741
- Act of Parliament
- Parliament of Great Britain
- Long title: An Act for the better enabling the Commissioners for building a Bridge cross the River Thames, from the City of Westminster to the opposite Shore in the County of Surrey, to finish the said Bridge, and to perform the other Trusts reposed in them; and for enlarging the Time for exchanging of Tickets unclaimed in the last Lottery for the said Bridge, and to make Provision for Tickets in the said Lottery, lost, burnt, or otherwise destroyed.
- Citation: 15 Geo. 2. c. 26
- Territorial extent: Great Britain

Dates
- Royal assent: 15 July 1742
- Commencement: 1 December 1741
- Repealed: 4 August 1853
Other legislation
Repealed by	Westminster Bridge Act 1853
Relates to	Westminster Bridge Act 1738; Westminster Bridge Act 1740

Status: Repealed

Text of statute as originally enacted

Westminster Bridge Act 1743
- Act of Parliament
- Parliament of Great Britain
- Long title: An Act to explain and make more effectual several Acts of Parliament, passed in the Reign of His present Majesty, for building a Bridge cross the River Thames, from the City of Westminster, to the opposite Shore in the County of Surrey; and for the better enabling the Commissioners for building the said Bridge to finish the same, and to perform the other Trusts reposed in them; as also for granting further Time for exchanging the Tickets unclaimed in the last Lottery for the said Bridge, and to make Provision for Tickets in the said Lottery, lost, burnt, or otherwise destroyed.
- Citation: 17 Geo. 2. c. 32
- Territorial extent: Great Britain

Dates
- Royal assent: 12 May 1744
- Commencement: 1 December 1743
- Repealed: 4 August 1853
Other legislation
Repealed by	Westminster Bridge Act 1853
Relates to	Westminster Bridge Act 1735; Westminster Bridge Act 1736; Westminster Bridge Act 1737; Westminster Bridge Act 1738; Westminster Bridge Act 1739; Westminster Bridge Act 1740; Westminster Bridge Act 1741; Westminster Bridge Act 1744; Westminster Bridge Act 1756; Westminster Bridge Act 1757; Prickard's Estate and Westminster Bridge Commissioners Act 1814; Westminster Bridge Act 1850

Status: Repealed

Text of statute as originally enacted

Westminster Bridge Act 1744
- Act of Parliament
- Parliament of Great Britain
- Long title: An Act for granting further Powers to the Commissioners for building a Bridge cross the River Thames, from the City of Westminster, to the opposite Shore in the County of Surrey; and for the better enabling them to finish the said Bridge, and to perform the other Trusts reposed in them.
- Citation: 18 Geo. 2. c. 29
- Territorial extent: Great Britain

Dates
- Royal assent: 2 May 1745
- Commencement: 27 November 1744
- Repealed: 4 August 1853
Other legislation
Repealed by	Westminster Bridge Act 1853
Relates to	Westminster Bridge Act 1735; Westminster Bridge Act 1736; Westminster Bridge Act 1737; Westminster Bridge Act 1738; Westminster Bridge Act 1739; Westminster Bridge Act 1740; Westminster Bridge Act 1741; Westminster Bridge Act 1743; Westminster Bridge Act 1756; Westminster Bridge Act 1757; Prickard's Estate and Westminster Bridge Commissioners Act 1814; Westminster Bridge Act 1850

Status: Repealed

Text of statute as originally enacted

Westminster Bridge Act 1756
- Act of Parliament
- Parliament of Great Britain
- Long title: An Act to enable the Commissioners for building a Bridge cross the River Thames, from the City of Westminster, to the opposite Shore in the County of Surry, to purchase Houses and Grounds, and to widen the Ways, and make more safe and commodious the Streets, Avenues, and Passages, leading from Charing Cross to the Two Houses of Parliament, Westminster Hall, and the Courts of Justice there, and Westminster Bridge; and to enable a less Number of Commissioners to execute the several Acts relating to the said Bridge than at present are required by Law; and for Relief of George and James King, with regard to a Lease taken by their late Father from the said Commissioners.
- Citation: 29 Geo. 2. c. 38
- Territorial extent: Great Britain

Dates
- Royal assent: 27 May 1756
- Commencement: 13 November 1755
- Repealed: 4 August 1853
Other legislation
Repealed by	Westminster Bridge Act 1853
Relates to	Westminster Bridge Act 1735; Westminster Bridge Act 1736; Westminster Bridge Act 1737; Westminster Bridge Act 1738; Westminster Bridge Act 1739; Westminster Bridge Act 1740; Westminster Bridge Act 1741; Westminster Bridge Act 1743; Westminster Bridge Act 1744; Westminster Bridge Act 1757; Prickard's Estate and Westminster Bridge Commissioners Act 1814; Westminster Bridge Act 1850

Status: Repealed

Text of statute as originally enacted

Westminster Bridge Act 1757
- Act of Parliament
- Parliament of Great Britain
- Long title: An Act to enable the Commissioners for building Westminster Bridge to widen the Street, or Avenue, leading from Cockspur Street to the Passage in Spring Garden, near Saint James's Park.
- Citation: 30 Geo. 2. c. 34
- Territorial extent: Great Britain

Dates
- Royal assent: 28 June 1757
- Commencement: 2 December 1756
- Repealed: 4 August 1853
Other legislation
Repealed by	Westminster Bridge Act 1853
Relates to	Westminster Bridge Act 1735; Westminster Bridge Act 1736; Westminster Bridge Act 1737; Westminster Bridge Act 1738; Westminster Bridge Act 1739; Westminster Bridge Act 1740; Westminster Bridge Act 1741; Westminster Bridge Act 1743; Westminster Bridge Act 1744; Westminster Bridge Act 1756; Prickard's Estate and Westminster Bridge Commissioners Act 1814; Westminster Bridge Act 1850

Status: Repealed

Text of statute as originally enacted

Prickard's Estate and Westminster Bridge Commissioners Act 1814
- Act of Parliament
- Parliament of the United Kingdom
- Long title: An Act for vesting in the Commissioners of Westminster Bridge the legal Estate in Fee Simple of certain Estates vested in Thomas Prickard, an Infant Trustee, and others; and for confirming a Sale made by the said Commissioners, and for making them a Corporation, and giving them further Powers of selling and leasing.
- Citation: 54 Geo. 3. c. cxxxii
- Territorial extent: United Kingdom

Dates
- Royal assent: 17 June 1814
- Commencement: 17 June 1814 (Note: Section 1)
- Repealed: 4 August 1853
Other legislation
Repealed by	Westminster Bridge Act 1853
Relates to	Westminster Bridge Act 1735; Westminster Bridge Act 1736; Westminster Bridge Act 1737; Westminster Bridge Act 1738; Westminster Bridge Act 1739; Westminster Bridge Act 1740; Westminster Bridge Act 1741; Westminster Bridge Act 1743; Westminster Bridge Act 1744; Westminster Bridge Act 1756; Westminster Bridge Act 1757; Westminster Bridge Act 1850

Status: Repealed

Text of statute as originally enacted

Westminster Bridge Act 1850 (Note: Section 2.)
- Act of Parliament
- Parliament of the United Kingdom
- Long title: An Act to enable the Commissioners of Westminster Bridge to build a temporary Bridge across the River Thames from Bridge Street in the City of Westminster to the opposite Shore in the County of Surrey.
- Citation: 13 & 14 Vict. c. cxii
- Territorial extent: United Kingdom

Dates
- Royal assent: 14 August 1850
- Commencement: 14 August 1850
- Repealed: 4 August 1853
Other legislation
Repealed by	Westminster Bridge Act 1853
Relates to	Westminster Bridge Act 1735; Westminster Bridge Act 1736; Westminster Bridge Act 1737; Westminster Bridge Act 1738; Westminster Bridge Act 1739; Westminster Bridge Act 1740; Westminster Bridge Act 1741; Westminster Bridge Act 1743; Westminster Bridge Act 1744; Westminster Bridge Act 1756; Westminster Bridge Act 1757; Prickard's Estate and Westminster Bridge Commissioners Act 1814; Westminster Bridge Act 1850; Lands Clauses Consolidation Act 1845

Status: Repealed

Text of statute as originally enacted

Westminster Bridge Act 1853 (Note: Section 27.)
- Act of Parliament
- Parliament of the United Kingdom
- Long title: An Act to transfer Westminster Bridge and the estates of the Commissioners of Westminster Bridge to the Commissioners of Her Majesty's Works and Public Buildings, and to enable such last-mentioned Commissioners to remove the present bridge and to build a new bridge on or near the site thereof.
- Citation: 16 & 17 Vict. c. 46
- Territorial extent: United Kingdom

Dates
- Royal assent: 4 August 1853
- Commencement: 4 August 1853
Other legislation
Repeals/revokes	Westminster Bridge Act 1735; Westminster Bridge Act 1736; Westminster Bridge Act 1737; Westminster Bridge Act 1738; Westminster Bridge Act 1739; Westminster Bridge Act 1740; Westminster Bridge Act 1741; Westminster Bridge Act 1743; Westminster Bridge Act 1744; Westminster Bridge Act 1757; Westminster Bridge Act 1756; Prickard's Estate and Westminster Bridge Commissioners Act 1814; Westminster Bridge Act 1850
Amended by	Local Law (Greater London Council and Inner London Boroughs) Order 1965
Relates to	Westminster Bridge Act 1859

Status: Partially repealed

Text of statute as originally enacted

Westminster Bridge Act 1859 (Note: Section 7.)
- Act of Parliament
- Parliament of the United Kingdom
- Long title: An Act to empower the Commissioners of Her Majesty's Works and Public Buildings to acquire additional Space for the Western Approach to Westminster New Bridge.
- Citation: 22 & 23 Vict. c. 58
- Territorial extent: United Kingdom

Dates
- Royal assent: 13 August 1859
- Commencement: 13 August 1859
- Repealed: 1 April 1965
Other legislation
Repealed by	Local Law (Greater London Council and Inner London Boroughs) Order 1965
Relates to	Westminster Bridge Act 1853; Westminster Bridge Act 1864

Status: Repealed

Text of statute as originally enacted

Westminster Bridge Act 1864
- Act of Parliament
- Parliament of the United Kingdom
- Long title: An Act for the better regulation of the traffic on Westminster Bridge and for the prevention of obstructions thereon.
- Citation: 27 & 28 Vict. c. 88
- Territorial extent: United Kingdom

Dates
- Royal assent: 29 July 1864
- Commencement: 29 July 1864
- Repealed: 18 July 1973
Other legislation
Repealed by	Statute Law (Repeals) Act 1973
Relates to	Westminster Bridge Act 1853; Westminster Bridge Act 1859

Status: Repealed

Text of statute as originally enacted

For over 600 years (at least 1129–1729), the nearest Thames bridge to London Bridge was at Kingston. From late Tudor times congestion in trading hours at London Bridge (for road goods and carriages from Kent, Essex, much of Surrey, Middlesex and beyond) often amounted to more than an hour. A bridge at Westminster was proposed in 1664, but opposed by the Corporation of London and the watermen. Further opposition held sway in 1722. However an intervening bridge (albeit in timber) was built at Putney in 1729 and the scheme received parliamentary approval in 1736. Financed by private capital, lotteries and grants, Westminster Bridge was built between 1739–1750, under the supervision of the Swiss engineer Charles Labelye. The Archbishop of Canterbury was to receive compensation for his loss of income from the Lambeth Horse ferry. The watermen who ran a ferry across the river at Westminster were to be compensated as well. The bridge opened on 18 November 1750.

The City of London responded to Westminster Bridge and the population growth by removing the buildings on London Bridge and widening it in 1760–63. With Putney Bridge, the bridge paved the way for four others within three decades: Blackfriars Bridge (1769, built by the City), Kew Bridge (1759), Battersea Bridge (1773), and Richmond Bridge (1777) by which date roads and vehicles were improved and fewer regular goods transported by water.

The bridge assisted the expanding West End to the developing South London as well as goods and carriages from the more estuarine counties and the East Sussex and Kentish ports. Without the bridge, traffic to and from the greater West End would have to negotiate streets often as congested as London Bridge, principally the Strand/Fleet Street and New Oxford Street/Holborn. Roads on both sides of the river were also built and improved, including Charing Cross Road and around the Elephant & Castle in Southwark.

=== The current bridge ===
By the mid-19th century the bridge was subsiding badly and expensive to maintain. The current bridge was designed by Thomas Page and opened on 24 May 1862. With a length of 820 feet (250 m) and a width of 85 feet (26 m), it is a seven-arch, cast-iron bridge with Gothic detailing by Charles Barry (the architect of the Palace of Westminster). The bridge carried a tram line for much of the first half of the twentieth century, from 1906 until 1952. On 5 July that year the last tram made a ceremonial journey across the bridge. Since the removal of Rennie's New London Bridge in 1967 it is the oldest road structure which crosses the Thames in central London.

On 22 March 2017, a terrorist attack started on the bridge and continued into Bridge Street and Old Palace Yard. Five people – three pedestrians, one police officer, and the attacker – died as a result of the incident. A colleague of the officer (who was stationed nearby) was armed and shot the attacker. More than 50 people were injured. An investigation into the attack was conducted by the Metropolitan Police.

Given its proximity to the British Parliament, Westminster Bridge has been a key site for protests in London. For instance, in January 2024, pro-Palestinian demonstrators led by the Free Palestine Coalition (FPC) attempted to occupy the bridge. Scuffles were reported, leading to arrests by the Metropolitan Police, after which protesters moved to occupy the surrounding roads when police restricted access to the bridge.

== Image gallery ==
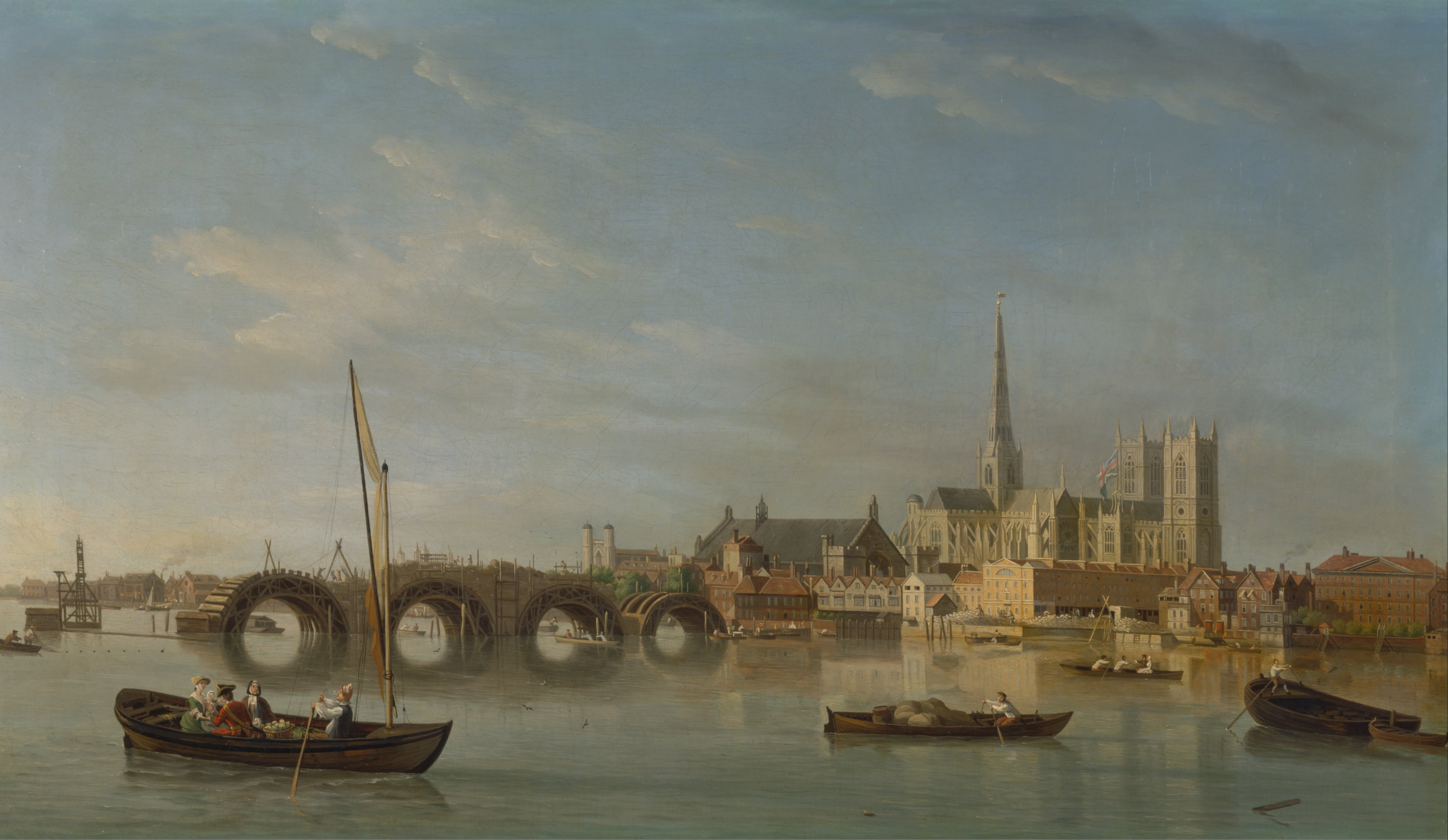
The Building of Westminster Bridge by Samuel Scott, 1742

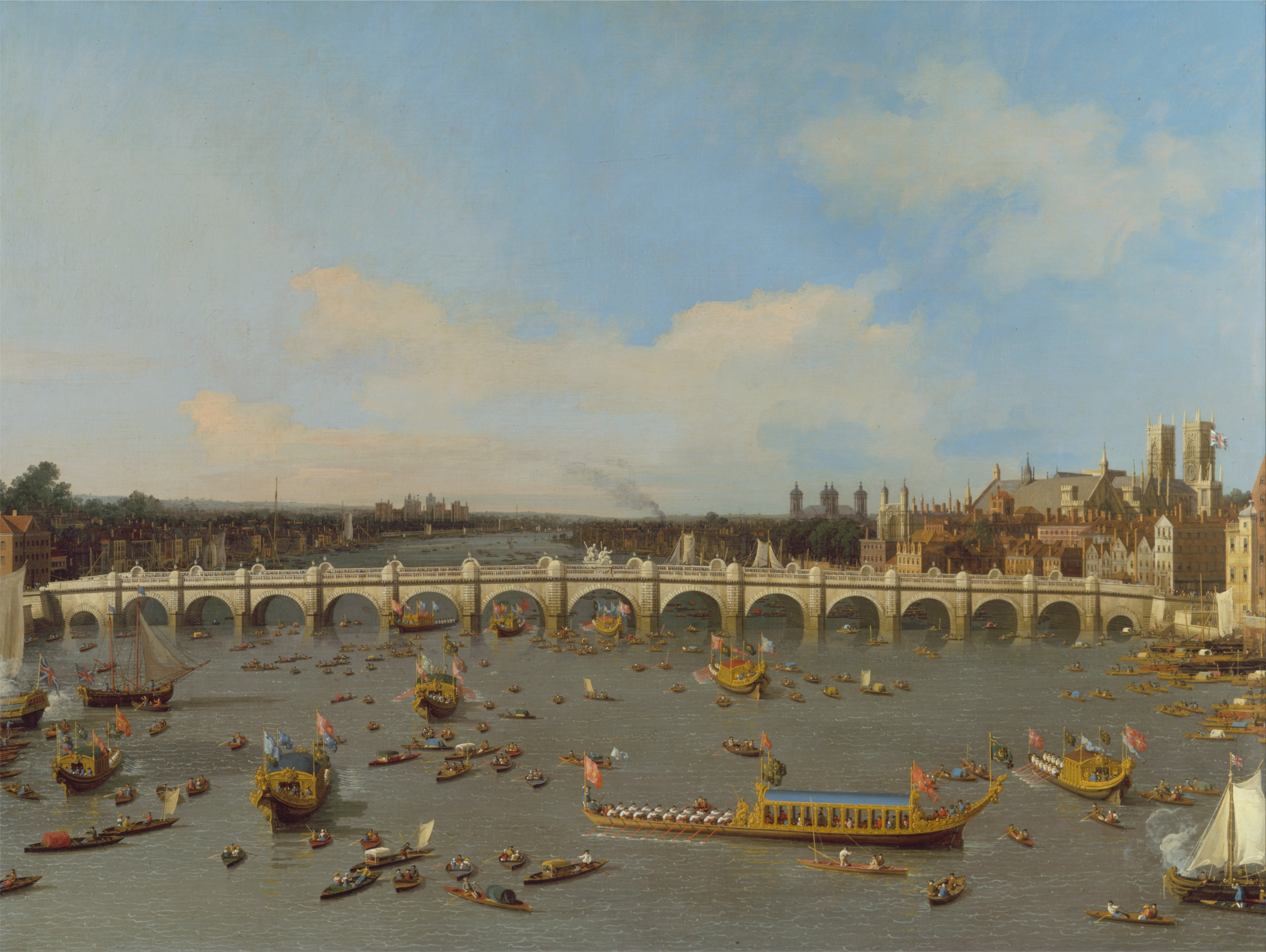
The first Westminster Bridge as painted by Canaletto, 1747. Yale Center for British Art, New Haven.

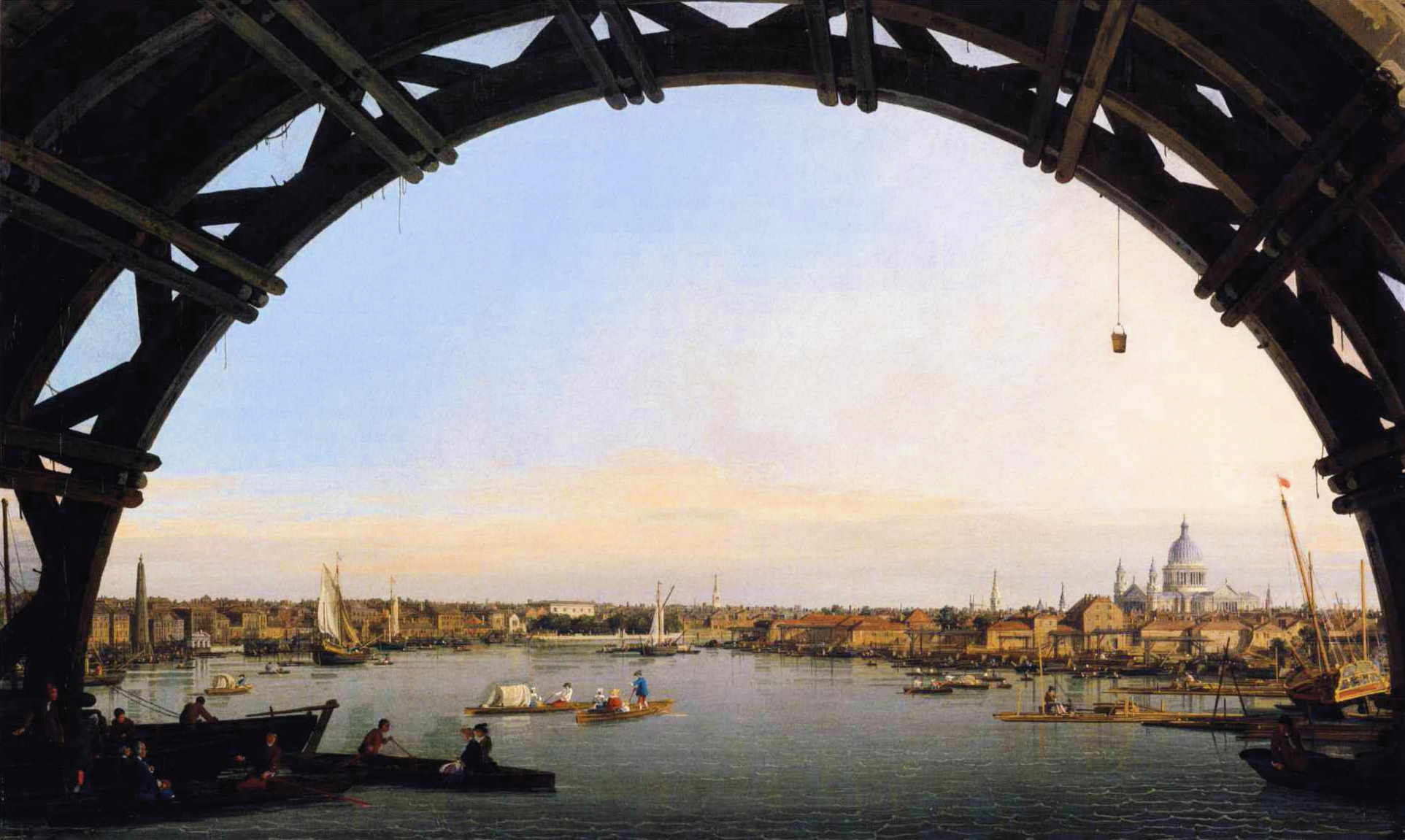
London Seen Through an Arch of Westminster Bridge by Canaletto, 1747

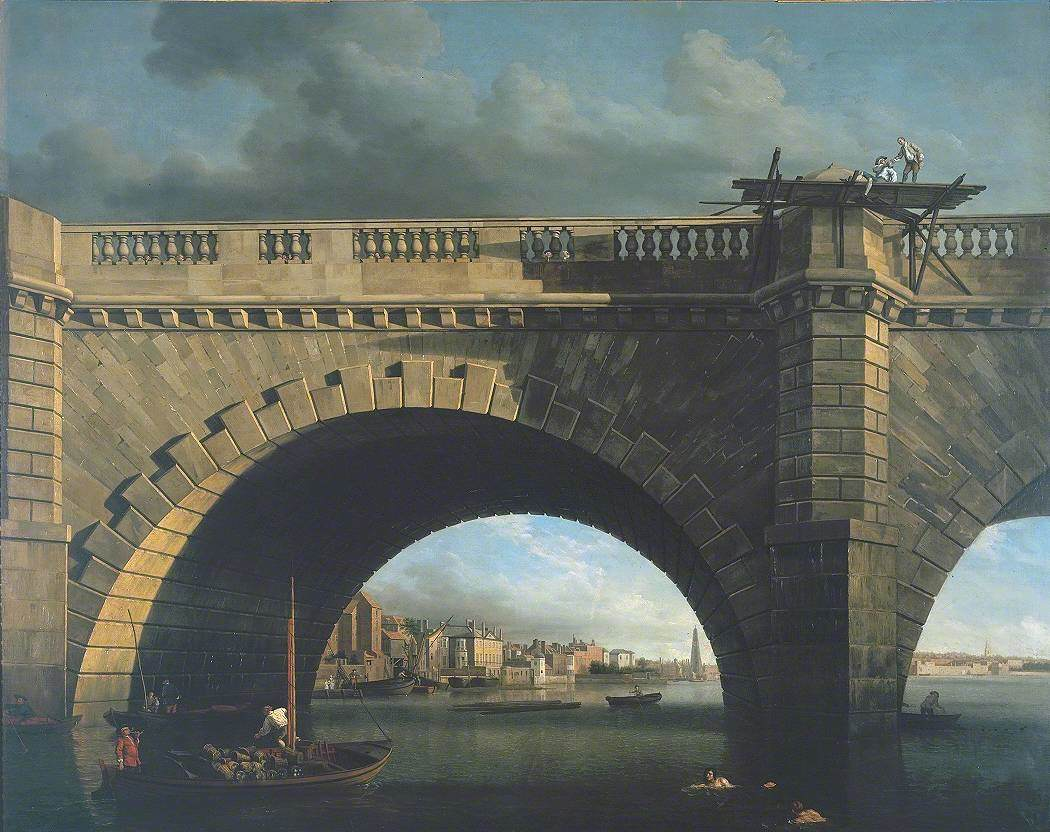
An Arch of Westminster Bridge by Samuel Scott, 1750

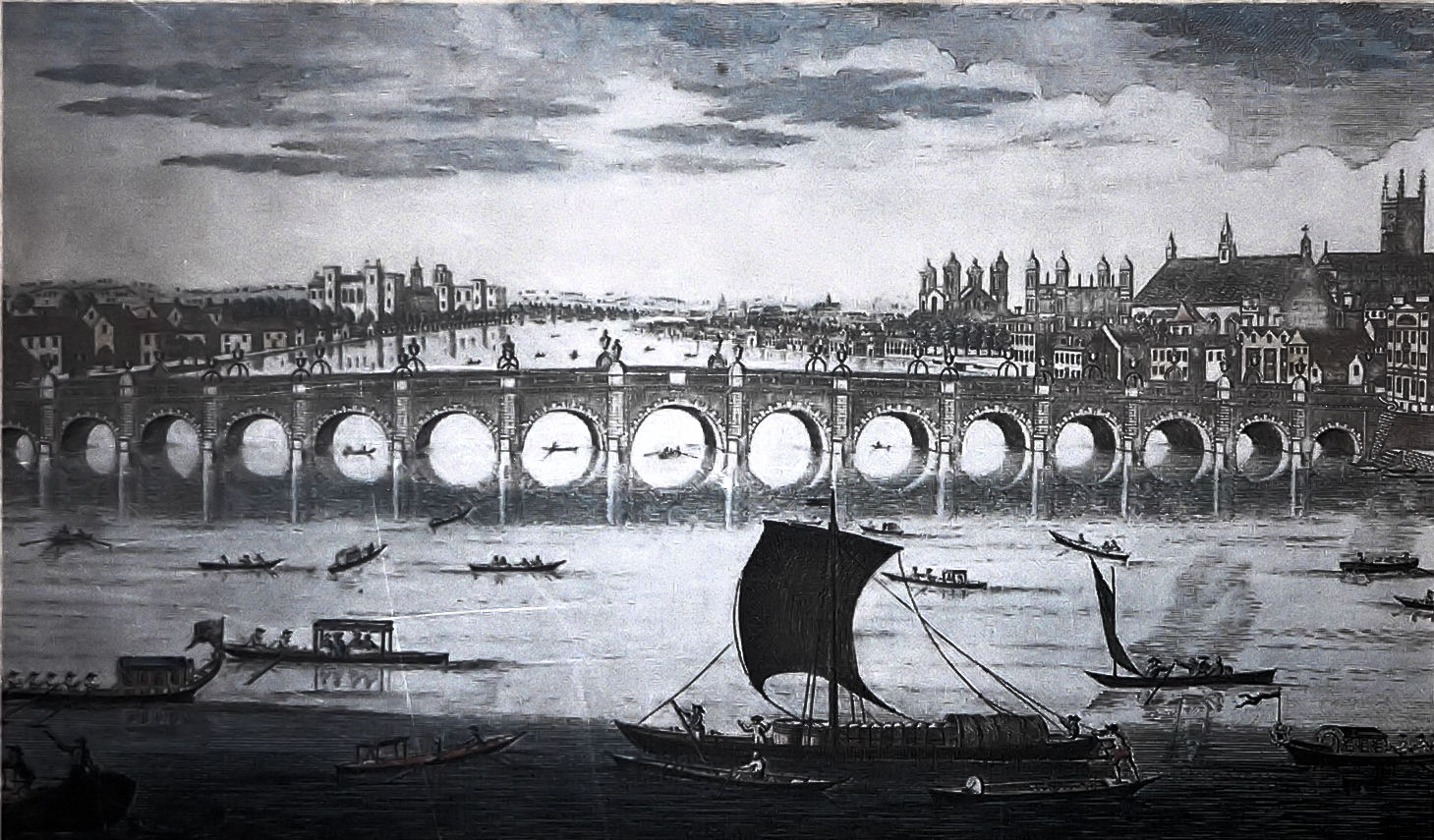
Westminster Bridge, around 1750

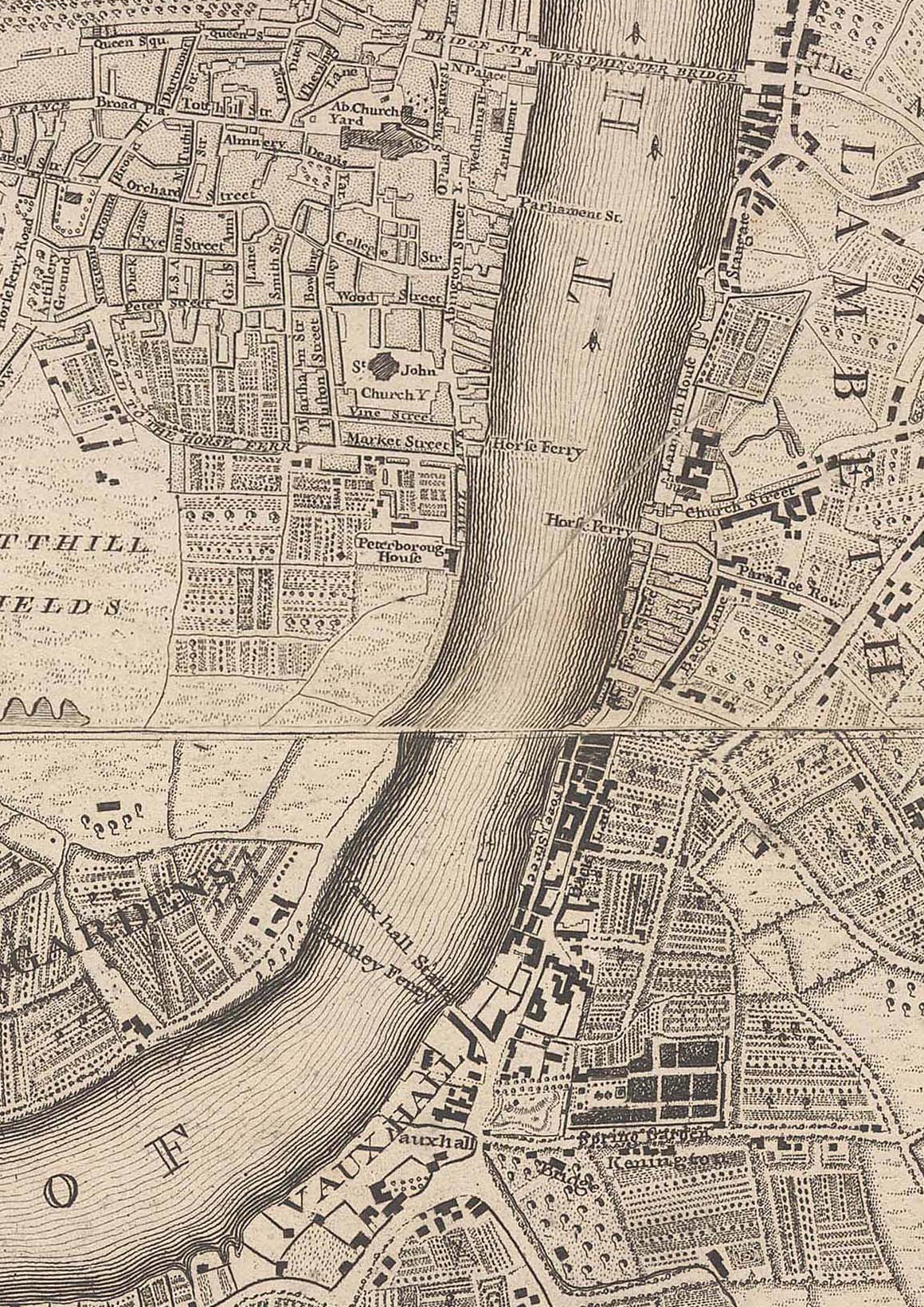
Westminster & Lambeth, 1746. Westminster Bridge, opened in 1740, connects Westminster to Lambeth; Huntley Ferry crosses the river on the site of the future Vauxhall Bridge

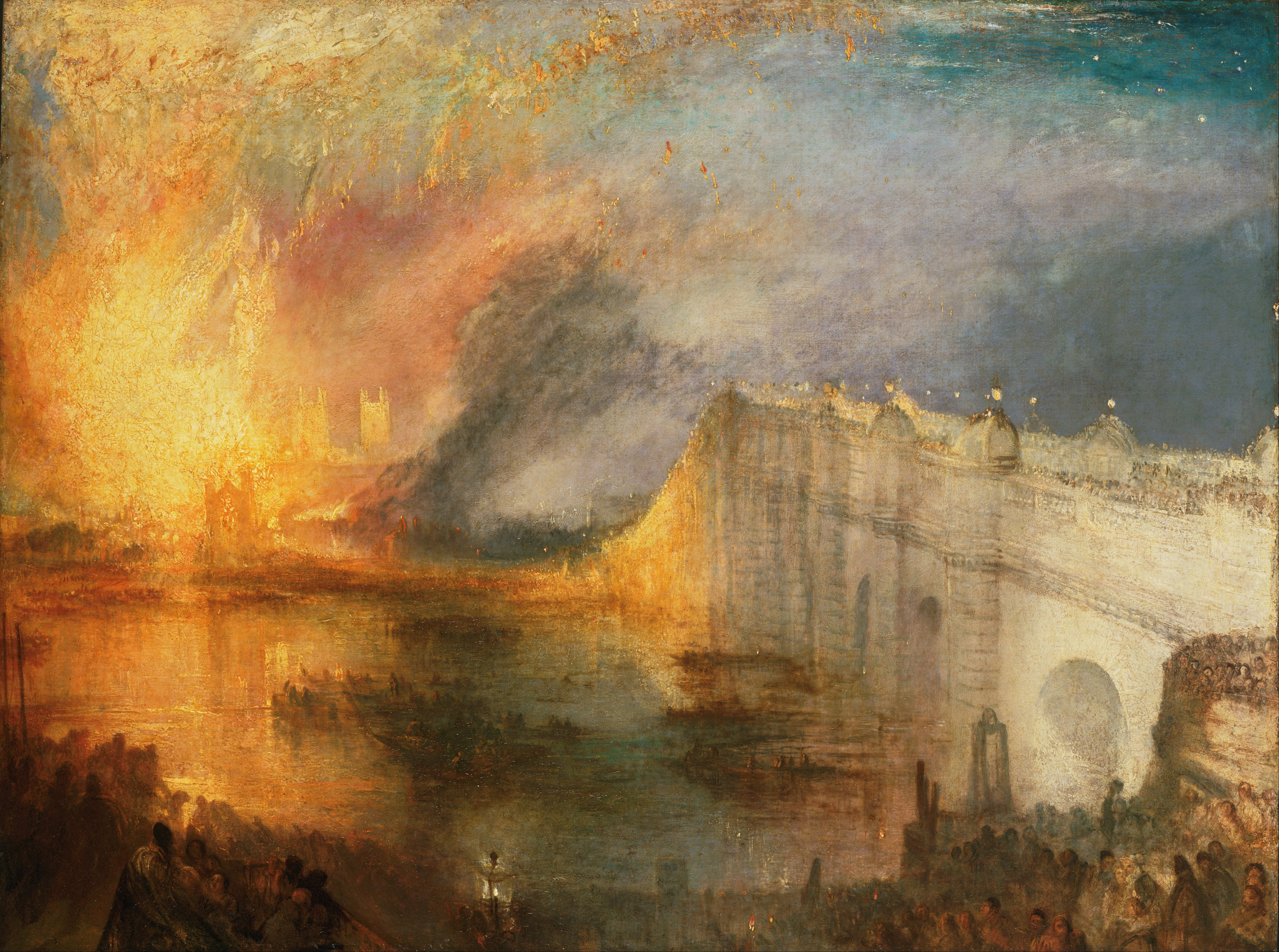
The Burning of the Houses of Lords and Commons by J. M. W. Turner, 1835, with Westminster Bridge on the right

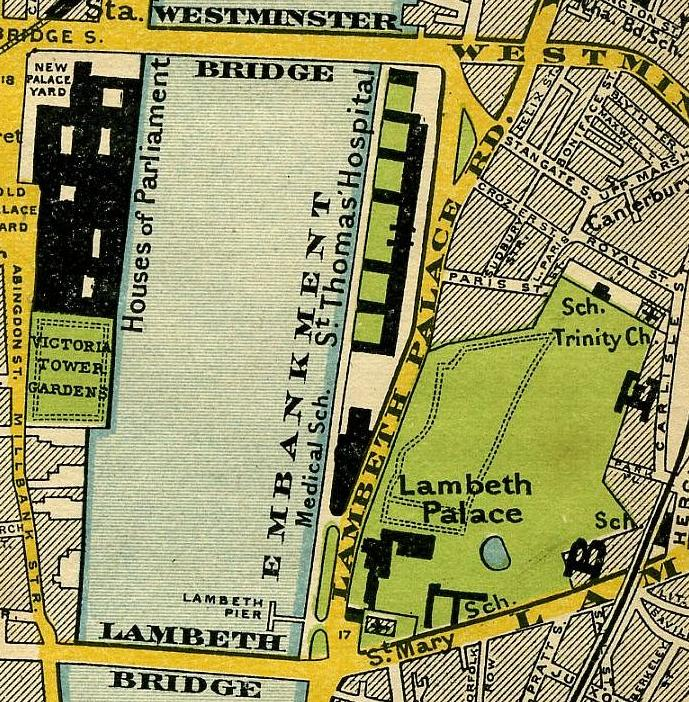
1897 map, showing Lambeth Palace, Lambeth Bridge, the Houses of Parliament and Westminster Bridge

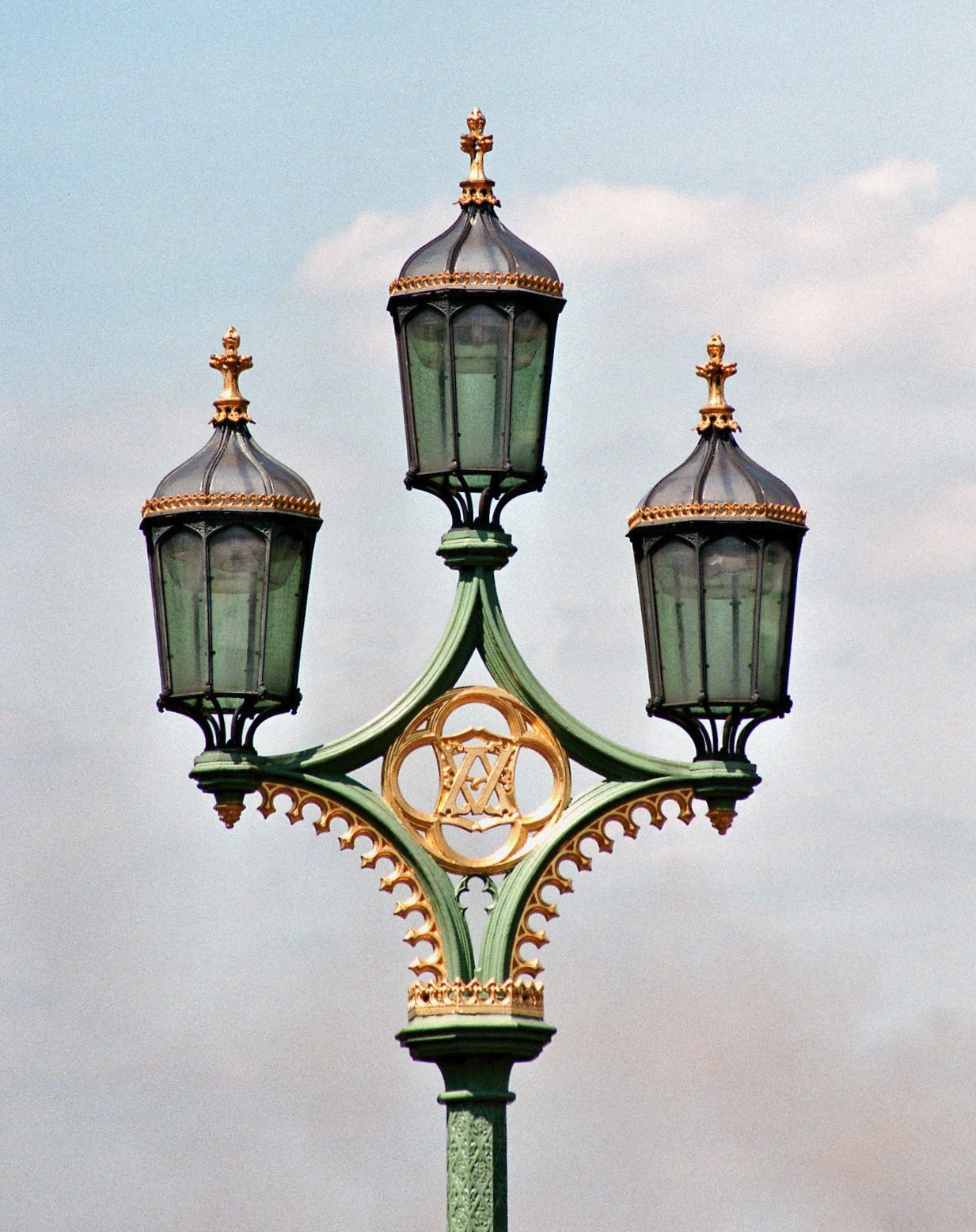
Street lamps on the bridge

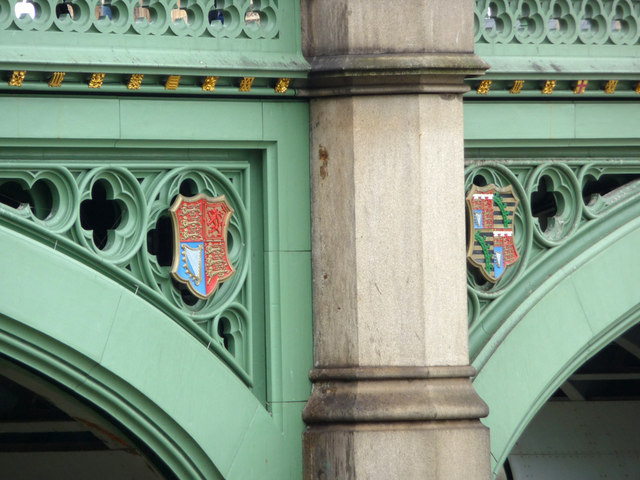
The coats of arms of Queen Victoria and Albert, Prince Consort on the bridge

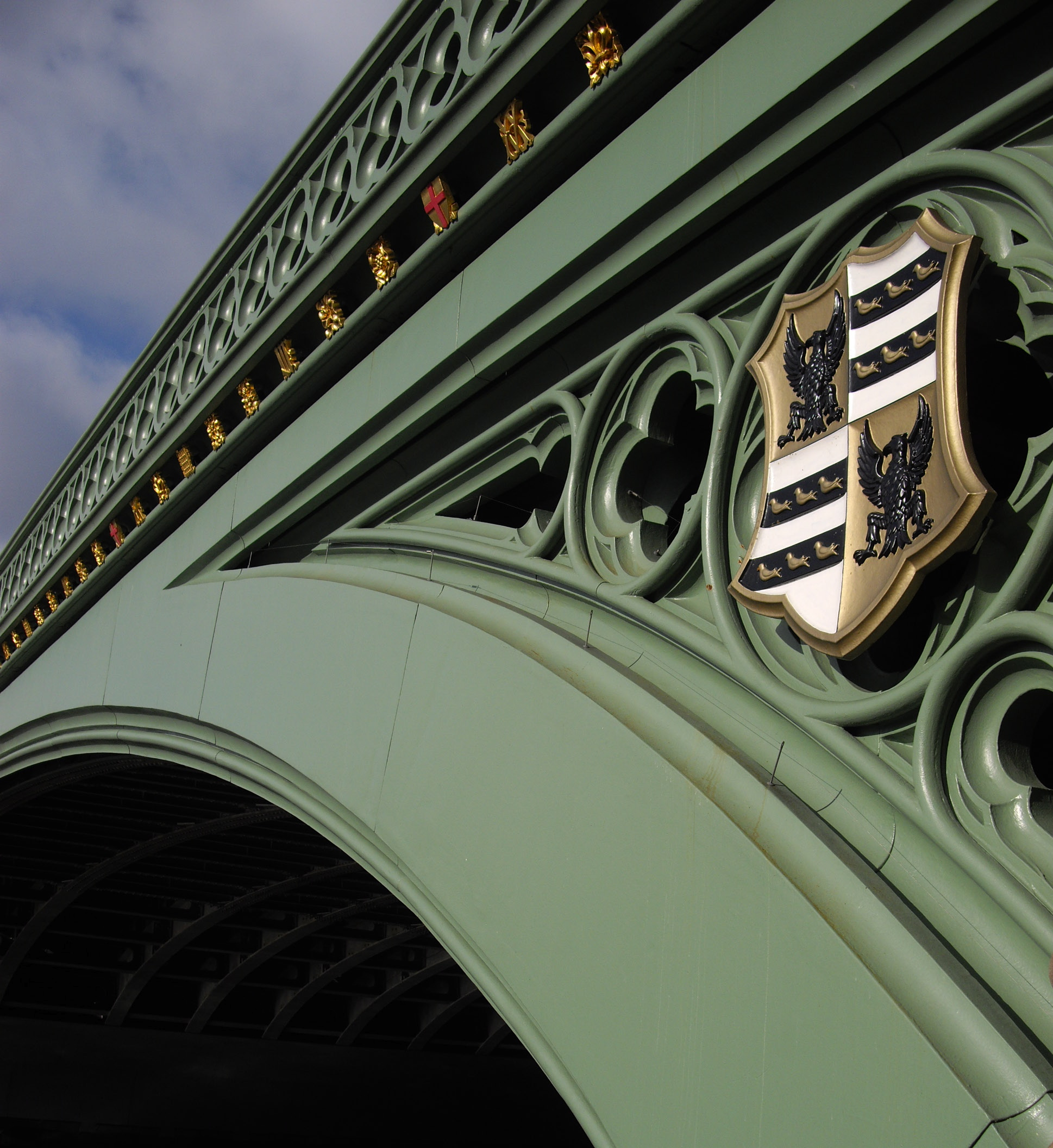
The coat of arms of Henry John Temple, 3rd Viscount Palmerston on the bridge. Palmerston was Prime Minister when the current bridge was opened.

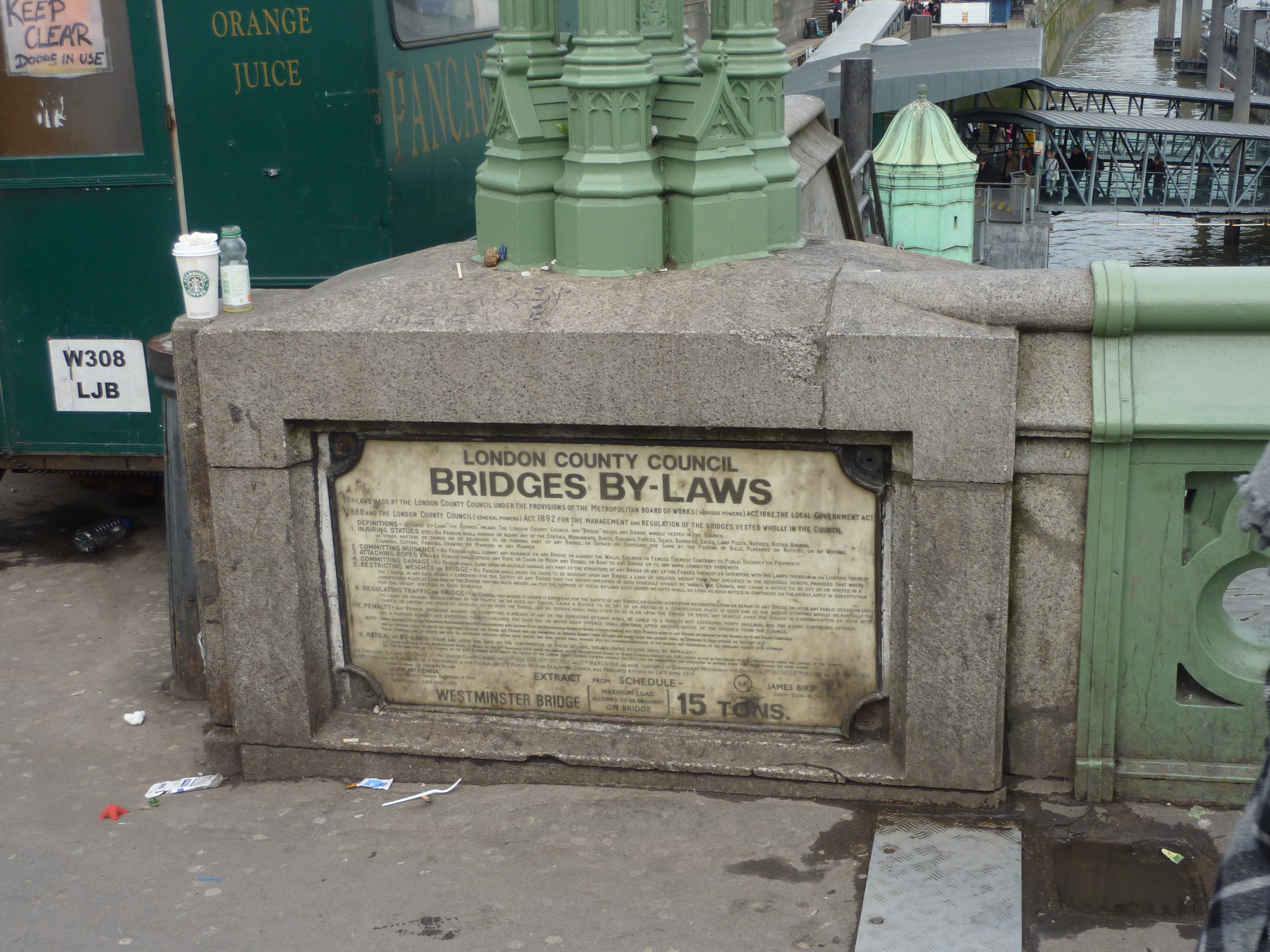
Westminster Bridge By-Laws Notice

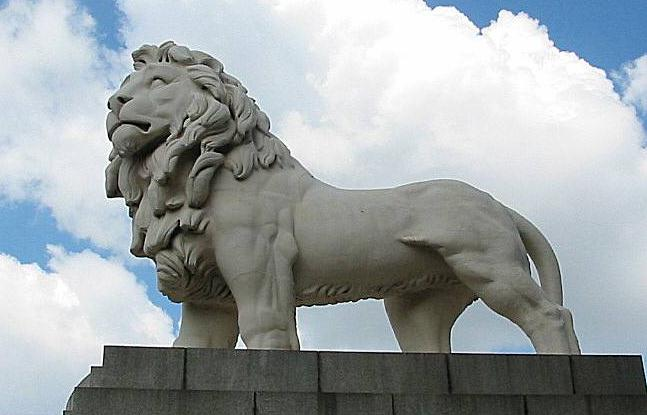
The South Bank Lion at the east end of Westminster Bridge

== In popular culture ==
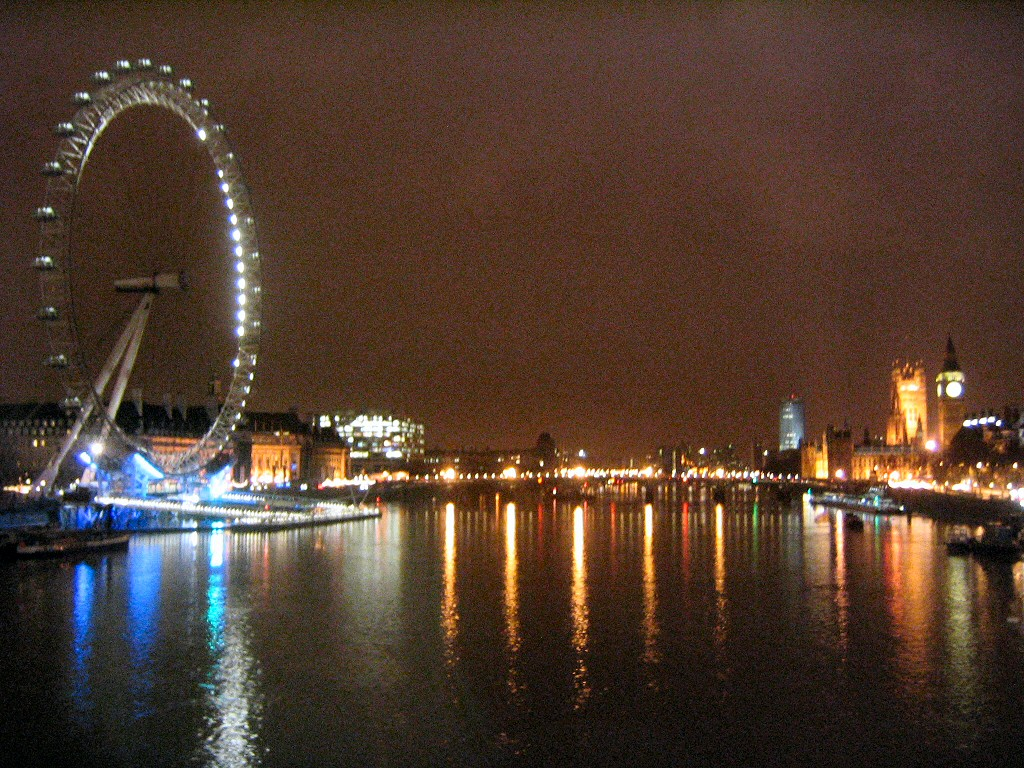
Westminster Bridge and surrounding landmarks at night

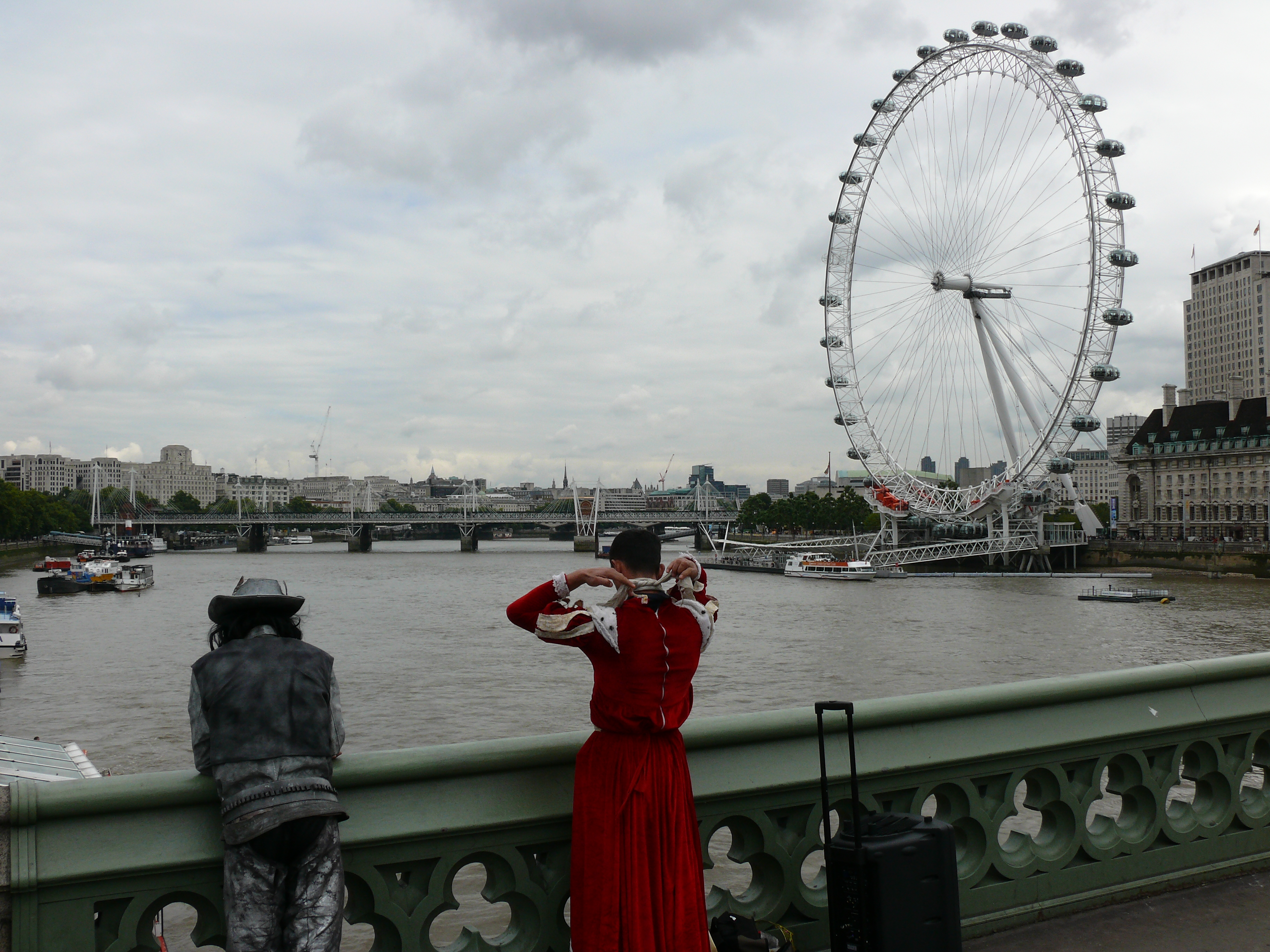
Street artists on Westminster Bridge and London Eye in the background

- In the 1964 Doctor Who serial The Dalek Invasion of Earth, the Daleks are seen moving across it in the 22nd Century.
- In 1807 the famous poem Composed upon Westminster Bridge, September 3, 1802 by William Wordsworth, written while standing on Westminster Bridge, was published in the "Collection of Poems" in two volumes.
- In the 2002 British horror film 28 Days Later, the protagonist awakes from a coma to find London deserted and walks over an eerily empty Westminster Bridge whilst looking for signs of life.
- Westminster Bridge is the start and finish point for the Bridges Handicap Race, a traditional London running race.
- The bridge was the site of a Pit Stop during the fourth season of the Israeli version of The Amazing Race.
- In the finale of the 24th James Bond film Spectre, Blofeld's helicopter crashes into Westminster Bridge.
- In the 2019 mobile game Mario Kart Tour, a track based on London called London Loop is featured in the game and makes an appearance in the Mario Kart 8 Deluxe Booster Course Pass DLC Wave 2. In all three variants of the original track in Mario Kart Tour, the race begins on the bridge, as well as in Mario Kart 8 Deluxe.

== See also ==
- List of crossings of the River Thames
- List of bridges in London
