= York Buildings Water Tower =

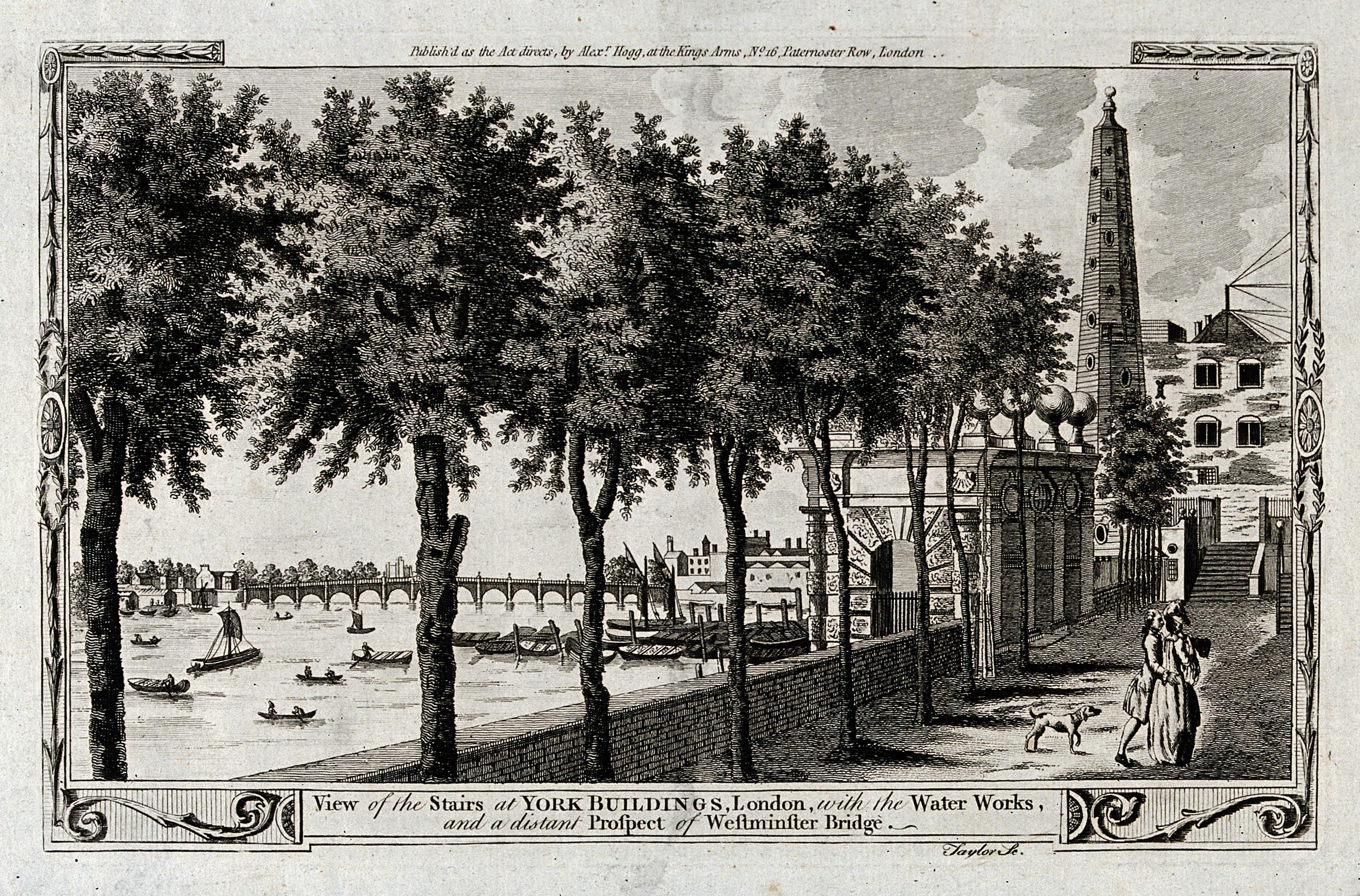
- Engraving of York Buildings and the Water Tower, c. 1780, by Isaac Taylor

- Location within Central London

General information
- Status: Demolished
- Type: Water tower
- Architectural style: Octagonal
- Location: Villiers Street, London, UK
- Coordinates: 51.507904°N 0.123049°W
- Completed: Late 17th century

Height
- Height: 70 feet (21 m)

Technical details
- Material: Wood

The York Buildings Waterworks' Water Tower was a water tower on the north bank of the River Thames and a dominant feature of the 18th century London skyline. It was built by the York Buildings Company, who operated the waterworks there.

The water tower was a wooden structure, 70 feet (21 m) high and with an octagonal cross-section. It was erected in the late 17th century on a site at the end of Villiers Street, by the York Watergate, now part of the Victoria Embankment Gardens. The Survey of London includes a drawing (plate 31 in volume 18) showing the building.

== In art ==
The prominent position and height of the water tower meant it appeared in many paintings and drawings of London's north bank at the time. These include:

Artist	Title (date)	Gallery/Collection	Notes
John Boydell	Westminster and the York Buildings Waterworks	Palace of Westminster	
Canaletto	London Seen Through an Arch of Westminster Bridge (1746–47)	Syon House	
Canaletto	London: The Old Horse Guards from St James's Park	Tate Gallery L02305 from The Andrew Lloyd Webber Foundation	
Canaletto	"The Thames at Westminster, London"	National Trust, Penrhyn Castle	
Joseph Farington	The Old Water Tower at York Buildings, Whitehall	Victoria and Albert Museum	
James Peller Malcolm	York Buildings looking towards Westminster with a View of the Water Tower		
James Malton	The River Thames Looking Towards Westminster with York Water Gate and the York Building Water Works (1797)	Tyne & Wear Archives & Museums	
William Marlow	The London Riverfront from Westminster to the Adelphi (1971–72)	Museum of London	
Samuel Scott	An Arch of Westminster Bridge (c.1750)	Tate Gallery T01193	
Samuel Scott	An Arch of Old Westminster Bridge (c.1750)	Tate Gallery N01223	
After Samuel Scott	A View of the Thames with the York Buildings Water Tower	Tate Gallery N01328	
After Samuel Scott	The Thames with the York Buildings Water Tower	National Museums Liverpool, Walker Art Gallery	
