= Charles Labelye =

Swiss bridge engineer and mathematician

Labelye's Naturalization Act 1745
- Act of Parliament
- Parliament of Great Britain
- Long title: An Act for naturalizing Charles Labelye.
- Citation: 19 Geo. 2. c. 26 Pr.
- Territorial extent: Great Britain

Dates
- Royal assent: 4 June 1746
- Commencement: 17 October 1745 (Note: Start of session.)

Status: Current legislation

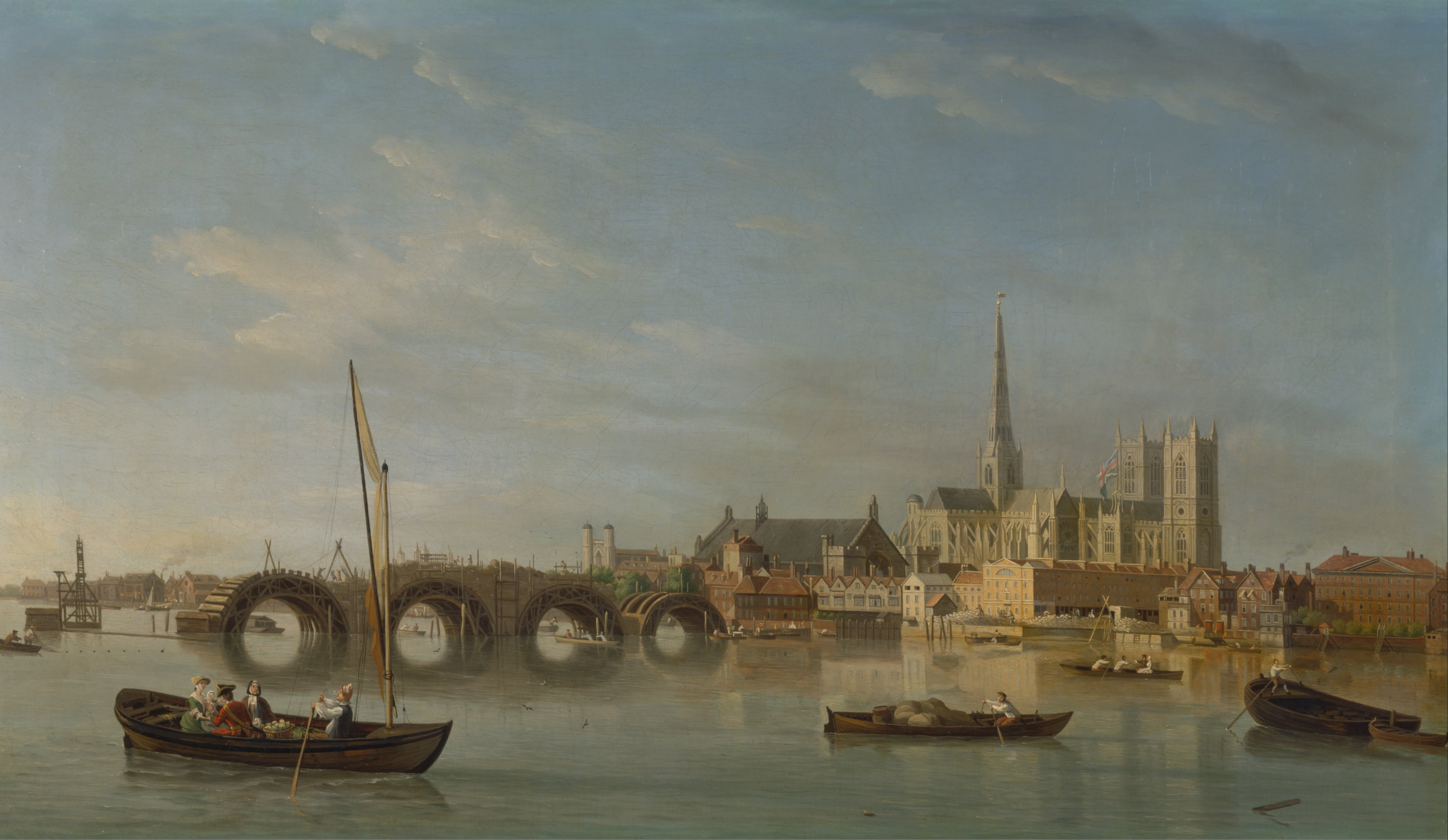
The Building of Westminster Bridge by Samuel Scott, 1742

Charles Labelye (1705, Vevey, Switzerland – 1762) was a Swiss bridge engineer and mathematician. Moving to England in the 1720s and receiving patronage from the Duke of Bedford and Earl of Pembroke, he is best known there for his work on the original Westminster Bridge (rebuilt in 1854–62) and his invention on that project of caissons as a method of bridge-building. This was praised on its completion, though during the period of construction he received heavy criticism from ill-informed observers, which worsened his health.

Other British projects of his were Brentford Bridge (1740–42), London Bridge (his consultations were sought in 1746 but not acted upon by the corporation of London), designs for a harbour at Sandwich (engraved by Harris about 1740) and reports on the port and harbour facilities at Great Yarmouth (1747) and Sunderland (1748, also with suggested improvements to the River Wear).

A private act of parliament in 1746, Labelye's Naturalization Act 1745 (19 Geo. 2. c. 26 Pr.), naturalised him as a British citizen, but in April 1752 he decided to leave England for southern France. He is known to have been in Naples in 1753, and to have later lived in Paris. In Paris he met and became friends with the fellow bridge-builder Jean-Rodolph Perronnet, bequeathing him papers and a model of Westminster Bridge.
