= Brightwell Church and Village =

Painting by John Constable

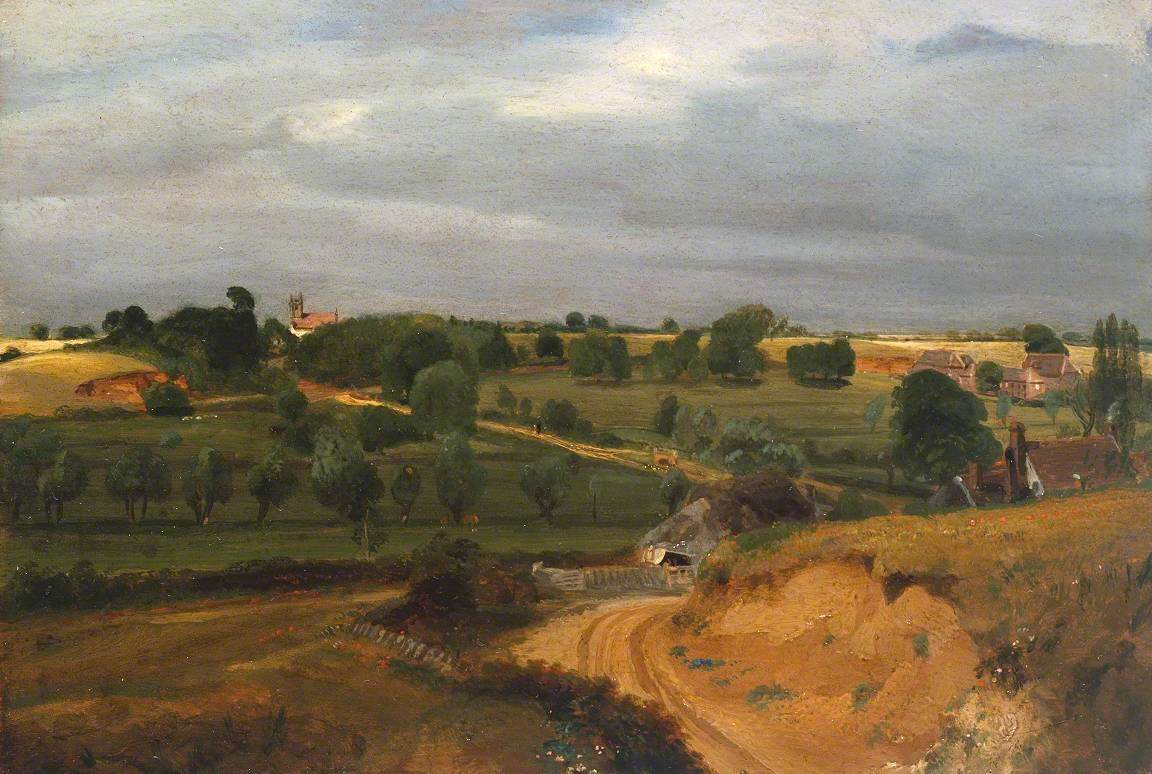
- Artist: John Constable
- Year: 1815
- Type: Oil on canvas, Landscape painting
- Dimensions: 22.8 cm × 15.5 cm (9.0 in × 6.1 in)
- Location: Tate Britain; London

Brightwell Church and Village is an 1815 landscape painting by the British artist John Constable. It depicts a view of Brightwell near Ipswich in Suffolk. Although showing his native county, it is some distance away from the area known as Constable Country. It was commissioned by the Reverend Barnwell. Today it is in the collection of Tate Britain in Pimlico.

== See also ==
- List of paintings by John Constable

== Bibliography ==
- Bury, Stephen (ed.) Benezit Dictionary of British Graphic Artists and Illustrators, Volume 1. OUP, 2012.
- Fleming-Williams, Ian & Parris, Leslie. The Discovery of Constable. Hamish Hamilton, 1984.
