= London Seen Through an Arch of Westminster Bridge =

1747 Painting by Canaletto

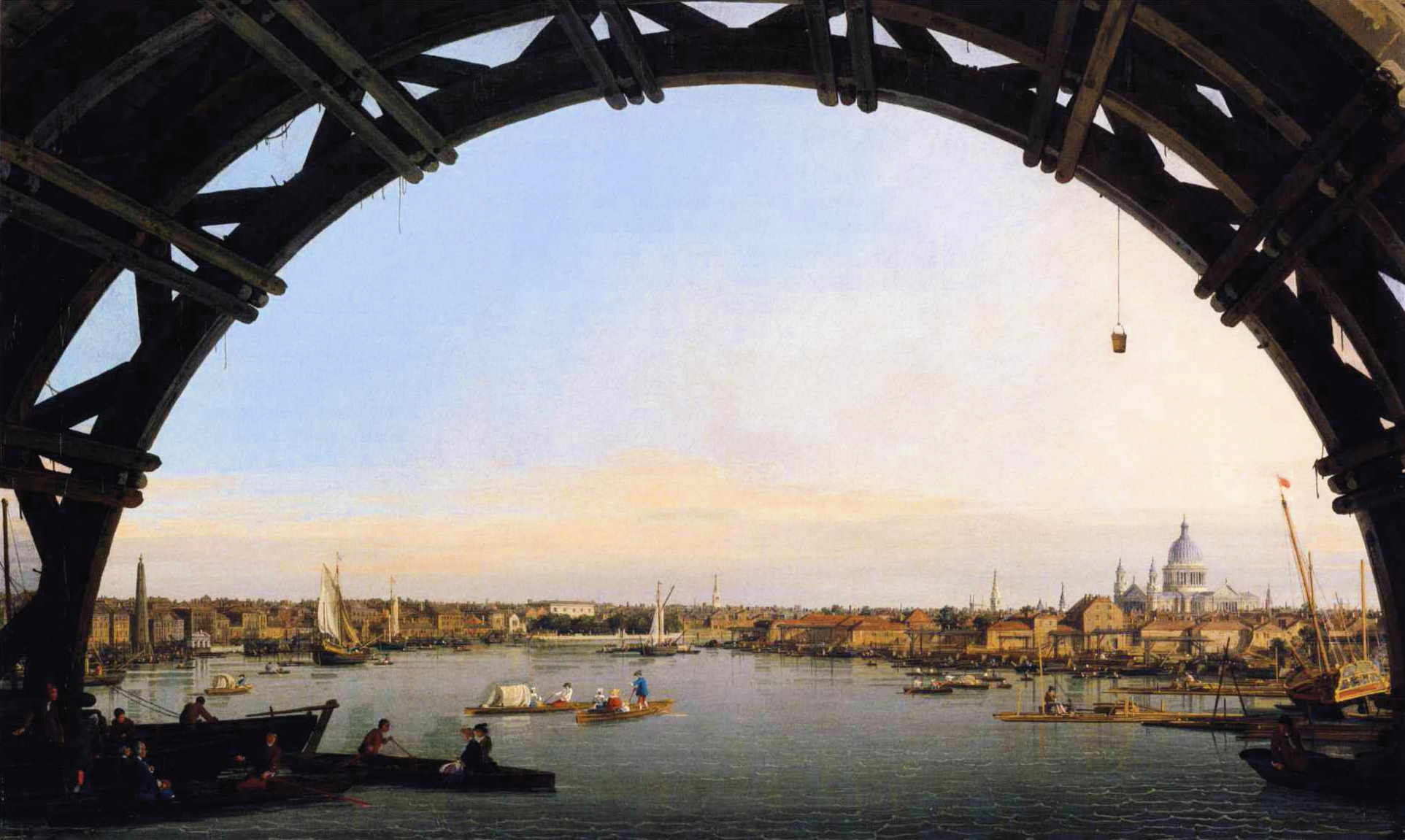
- Artist: Canaletto
- Year: 1747
- Type: Oil on canvas
- Dimensions: 57 cm × 95 cm (22 in × 37 in)
- Location: Private Collection; Alnwick Castle

London Seen Through an Arch of Westminster Bridge is a 1747 riverscape painting by the Italian artist Canaletto.

Painted during his nine year stay in England, Canaletto depicts a view through one of the arches of Westminster Bridge which was still under construction. It was London's second bridge, to rival the older London Bridge to the east. It captures a view of the river traffic on the Thames as well as several London landmarks including the York Water Tower in Westminster and Saint Paul's Cathedral in the City of London. It remains in the collection of the Dukes of Northumberland and hangs in Alnwick Castle.

== Bibliography ==
- Liversidge, M.J.H. & Farrington, Jane. Canaletto & England. Merrel Holberton, 1993.
- Martineau, Jane & Robison, Andrew. The Glory of Venice: Art in the Eighteenth Century
- Uzanne, Octave. Canaletto. Parkstone International, 2023.

== See also ==
- List of paintings by Canaletto
