= John Edwards (painter) =

English painter

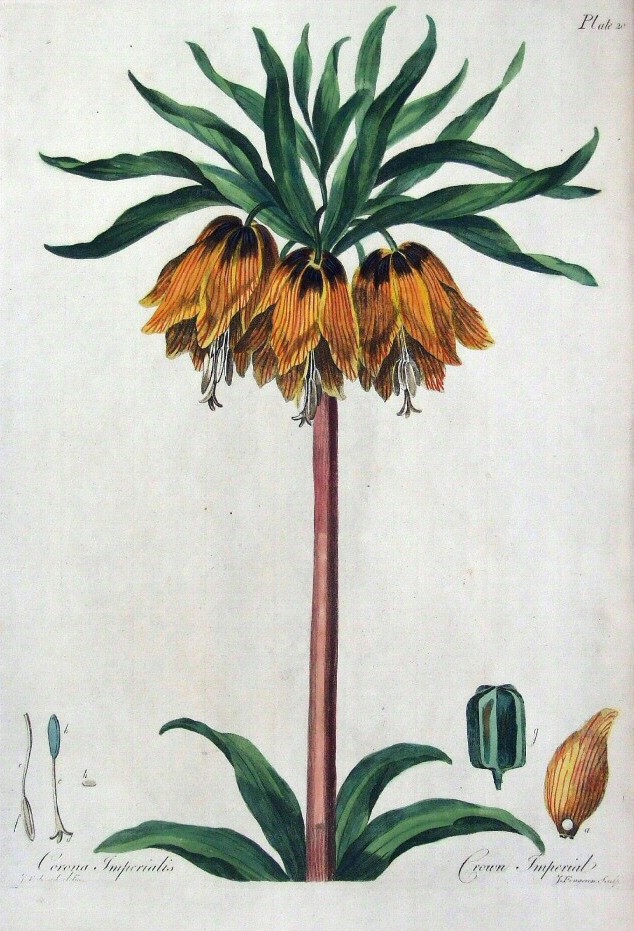
Crown Imperial Fritallaria The British Herbal

John Edwards (1742 – 31 August 1815) was an English botanist, painter, designer and illustrator, noted for his serial publication, The British Herbal.

After living in London until about 1778, he moved to Surrey, and exhibited with the Royal Academy and the Society of Artists, of which he was a member. Edward also produced textile designs, especially for calico. He published The British Herbal Containing One Hundred Plates of The most beautiful and scarce Flowers and Useful Medicinal Plants in monthly parts between 1769 and 1770, covering exotic and British flowers, using text gathered from various sources, and his own hand-coloured engraved plates.

A Collection of Flowers Drawn after Nature & Disposed in an Ornamental & Picturesque Manner, was his next publishing venture. The imprint dates of the plates show that he had started the project in 1783, completing 79 plates through the 1780s and 1790s. Edwards designed, etched and coloured all the plates himself, thus having complete control of the operation.

Edwards died in Hampstead.
