= The Building of Westminster Bridge =

Painting by Samuel Scott

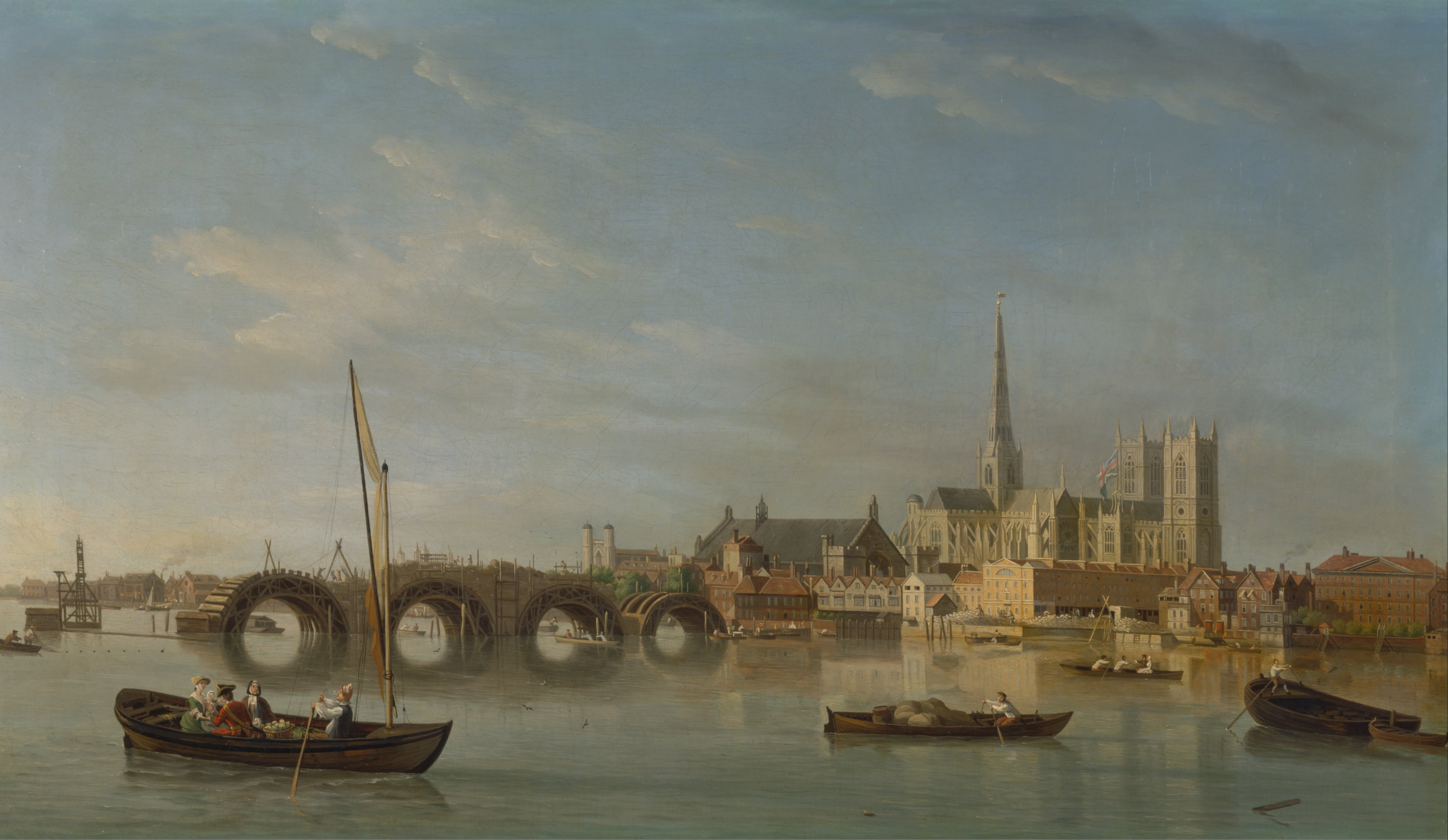
- Version in the Yale Center for British Art
- Artist: Samuel Scott
- Year: 1742
- Type: Oil on canvas, history painting
- Dimensions: 68.6 cm × 119.4 cm (27.0 in × 47.0 in)
- Location: Yale Center for British Art, New Haven

The Building of Westminster Bridge is an oil on canvas riverscape painting by the English artist Samuel Scott, from 1742.

== History and description ==
It depicts the construction of Westminster Bridge across the River Thames in London. Visible on the skyline are St John's, Smith Square, Westminster Hall, Westminster Abbey and the tower St Margaret's.

It was the city's second bridge across the Thames following the medieval era London Bridge, built from 1739 and opening in 1750 to a design by the architect Charles Labelye. It was built from the centre outwards and by the time Scott sketched it it had four arches under construction. Scott was a pioneering British maritime painter who increasingly turned to views of Thames. His contemporary Canaletto also painted the bridge several times during his period in England. It was also notably painted in its incomplete state by Richard Wilson.

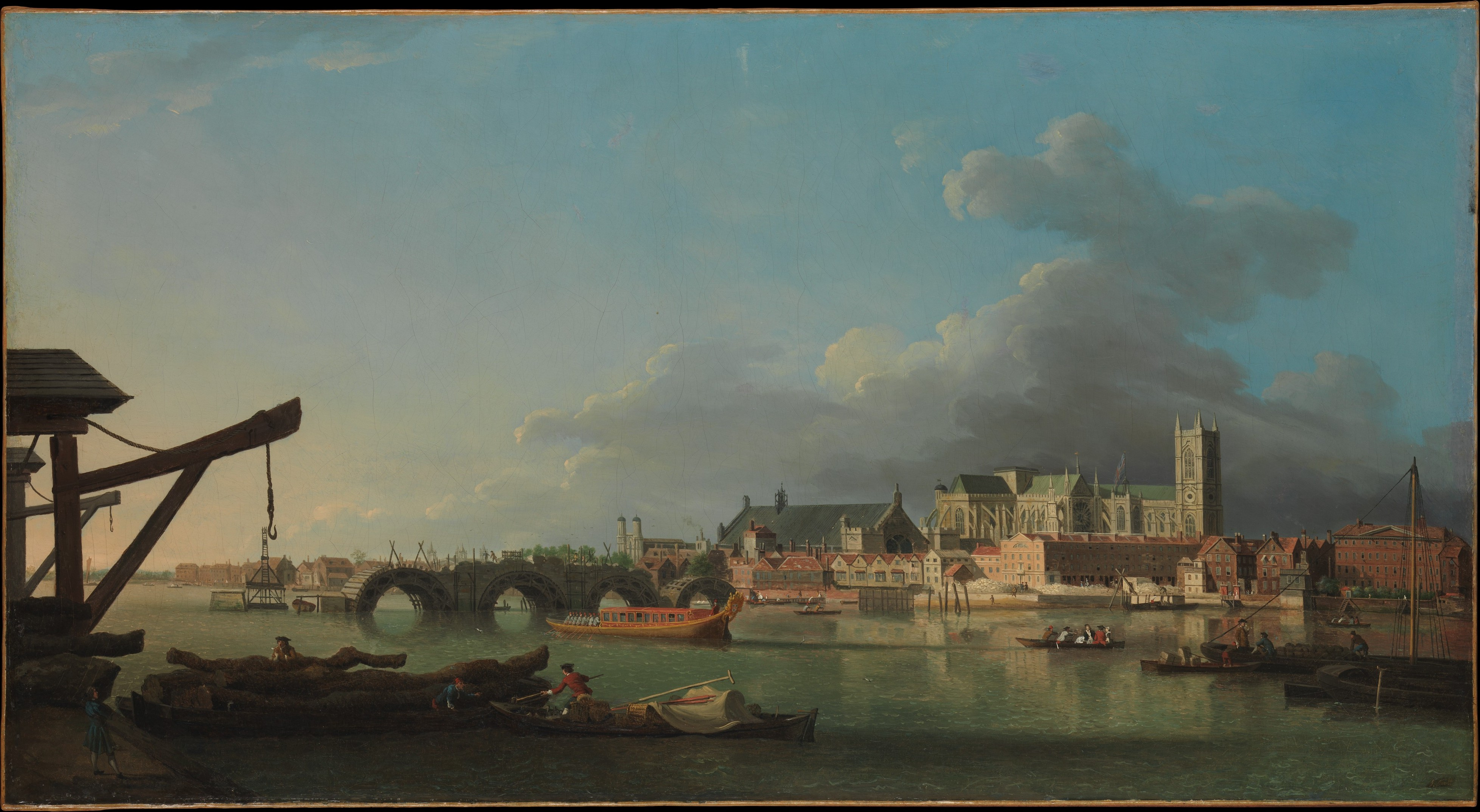
Version of the painting in the Metropolitan Museum of Art

It is viewed from a timber yard on the southern bank of the Thames and features two engineering innovations used on the project, a sinking caisson and a horse-powered pile driver. Several versions of the painting exist. One held by the Yale Center for British Art is notable for including both the towers under construction at Westminster Abbey and a planned spire that was never actually built. These do not appear on the version in the Metropolitan Museum of Art. That work does feature the Lord Mayor's barge approaching the construction site.

== Bibliography ==
- Baetjer, Katharine. British Paintings in the Metropolitan Museum of Art, 1575-1875. Metropolitan Museum of Art, 2009.
- Chambers, Mortimer. The Western Experience: The Early Modern Era. McGraw-Hill, 1995.
- Kerber, Peter Björn. Eyewitness Views: Making History in Eighteenth-Century Europe. Getty Publications, 2017.
- Shepherd, Robert. Westminster: A Biography: From Earliest Times to the Present. A&C Black, 2012.
