= Pope's villa =

Alexander Pope's house, Middlesex, England

Coordinates: 51.4421°N 0.3313°W

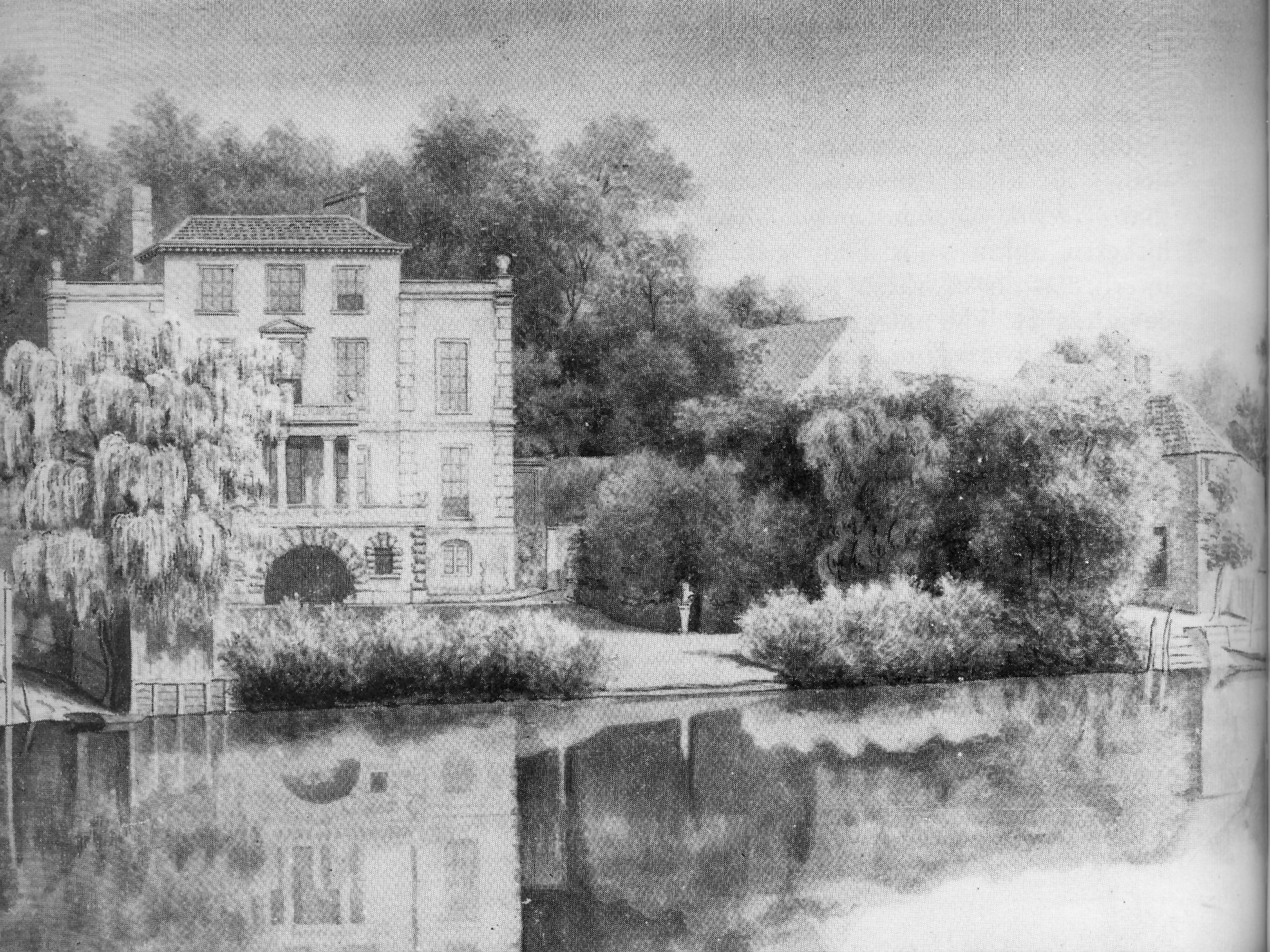
Pope's house at Twickenham, showing the grotto. From a watercolour produced soon after his death.

Pope's villa was the residence of the poet Alexander Pope at Twickenham, then a village west of London in Middlesex. He moved there in 1719 and created gardens and an underground grotto. When Baroness Howe of Langar (1762–1835) purchased the house, she demolished it in 1808 and built a new house next to the site. The house and grotto were topics of 18th- and 19th-century poetry and art. In about 1845, a neo-Tudor house known as Pope's Villa was built on approximately the same site; it has been used as a school since the early 20th century. Pope's Grotto, which is listed Grade II* by Historic England, survives, and is open to the public on 30 weekends each year.

== Alexander Pope's villa ==
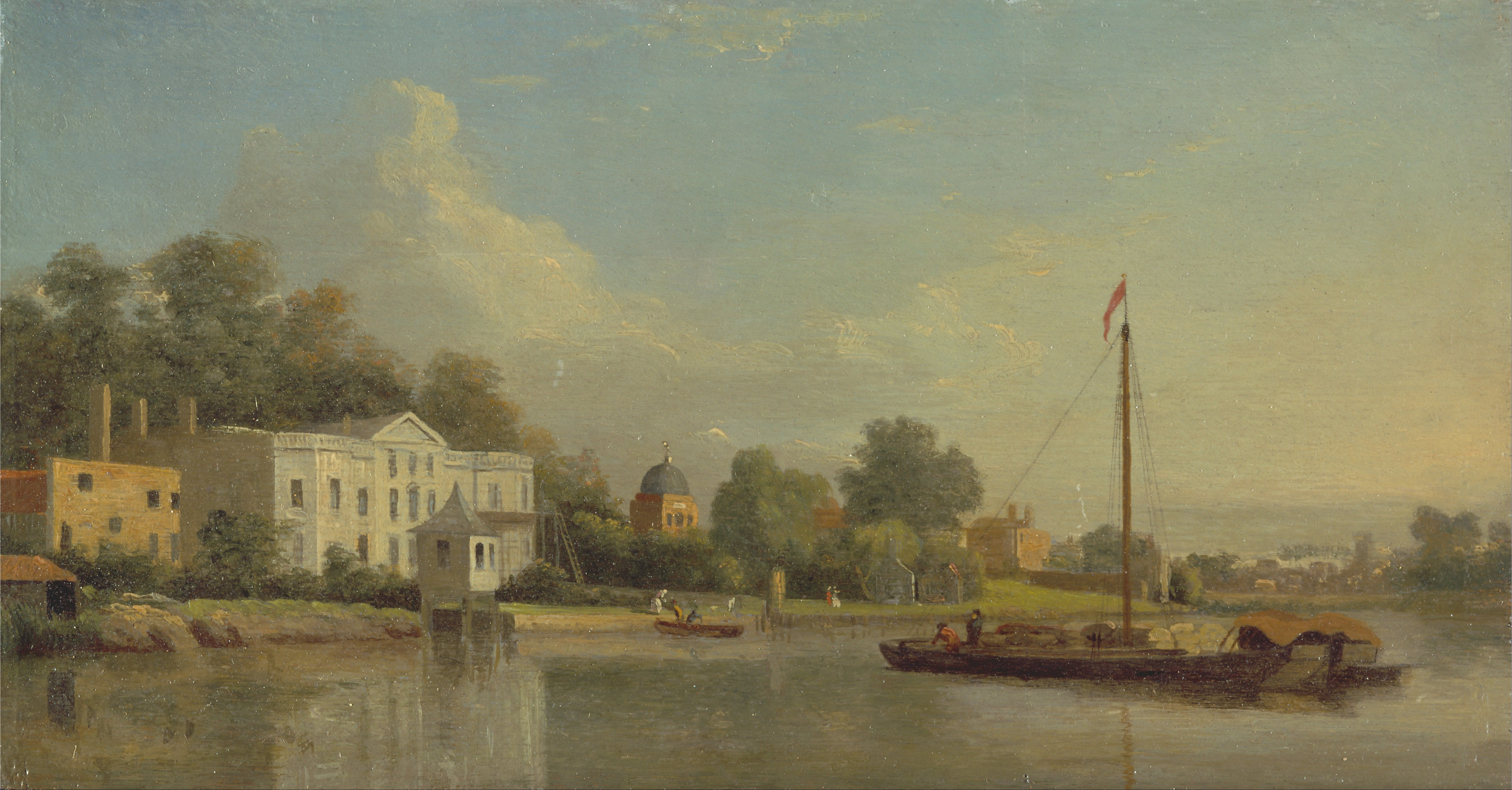
A View of Alexander Pope's Villa, Twickenham by Samuel Scott (c. 1759)

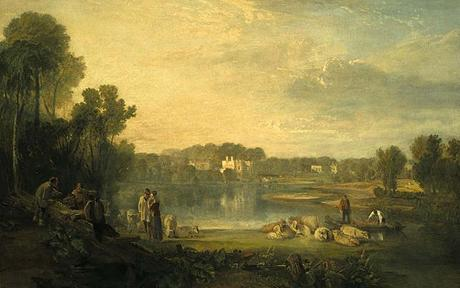
Pope's Villa at Twickenham by J. M. W. Turner (1808)

Alexander Pope moved in 1719 to Twickenham, where many wealthy Londoners had houses. From Thomas Vernon, a local landowner, he leased a piece of land close to the water on a stretch of the River Thames known as Cross Deep; there were two cottages on the site and Vernon added a third. Pope demolished one cottage and part of a second and employed the architect James Gibbs to create a house in Palladian style, which became known as Pope's villa. He had it extended with a portico by William Kent in 1733.

Contemporary drawings and paintings of Pope's villa show a fairly conventional classical 18th-century English country house rather than a faithful reproduction or pastiche of a Palladian villa. The house was on three floors, with a central corps de logis of three bays under a hipped roof, flanked by two lower wings of only one bay each with roofs concealed by a closed parapet. The flanking bays had ashlar quoins. The only decoration to the facade consisted of a pedimented window at the centre of the principal floor, and a stone urn at each termination of the closed parapet. An unusual feature of the facade was at its centre on the ground floor—a large elliptical arch with dominating voussoirs. The arch, flanked by small Florentine Renaissance style windows, is redolent of a water entrance to the portico of a Venetian palazzo. Bearing in mind the proximity of Pope's Villa to the River Thames, this resemblance is unlikely to be coincidental. The arch, or portal, was contained in a ground projection of the corps de logis which formed the base for the modest portico, more a porch; asked by Pope for his opinion of this renovation, Lord Burlington wrote that "my friend Kent has done all that can be, considering the place".

Pope planted a weeping willow on the small piece of land next to the house (a tree trunk in the loggia of the grotto is said to be from this tree or another planted by him), and on about 5 acres (2 ha) across the street now also called Cross Deep, laid out one of the first picturesque gardens. According to Pope himself, the garden included "a Theatre, an Arcade, a Bowling Green, a Grove, and a 'What Not'". After receiving a licence to do so in 1720, he constructed a tunnel leading from under the house to the garden, and branching from this, a Romantic grotto.

After Pope's death in 1744, the house was acquired by Sir William Stanhope, who enlarged it with the addition of side wings in 1758. He also extended the garden, and built a second tunnel; what remains of this is a Grade II* listed building. Little remains of the garden, but the site was listed Grade II on 1 October 1987 and a brick gazebo is also a Grade II listed building.

The house remained in Stanhope's family until 1807, when Baroness Howe of Langar (1762–1835) bought it; she had it demolished the following year and built a new house next to the site, and also removed some of the decorations from the grotto and made further changes to the garden. Baroness Howe's house was subsequently partially demolished and the remainder divided into two houses, Ryan House and River Deep.

Pope's villa and its gardens and grotto were frequently mentioned in poetry and depicted in art. Beginning with Pope's own verse and continuing after his death, "[The house] rapidly ... established itself as the seat of the Muses, and his garden as a model of landscape design." Even more numerous are pictures of the house: although the facade facing the road does not seem to have been depicted, at least 55 drawings, paintings, aquatints, engravings, etchings, and lithographs produced between 1730 and 1888 survive which show the river facade or the grotto. These began with drawings and paintings by Pope himself and his friends and continued with works he may have commissioned (a sketch of the Shell Temple by Kent and a painting by Peter Tillemans from c. 1730) and throughout much of the 19th century. Samuel Scott painted two versions of a view of Pope's villa after Stanhope's additions. When it was demolished, J. M. W. Turner, who was a neighbour, objected; his painting Pope's Villa at Twickenham mourns its loss.

== Pope's Grotto ==
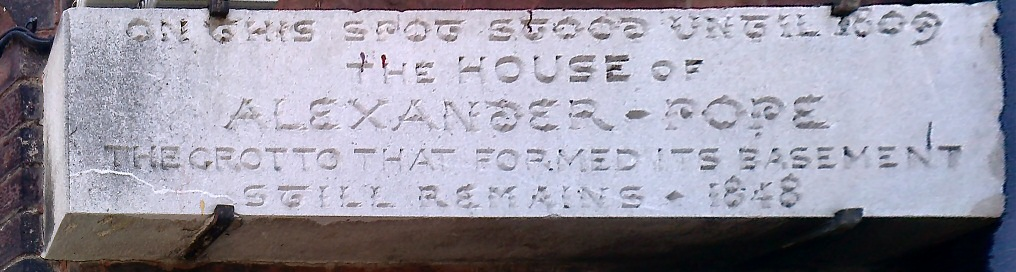
Plaque above Pope's Grotto

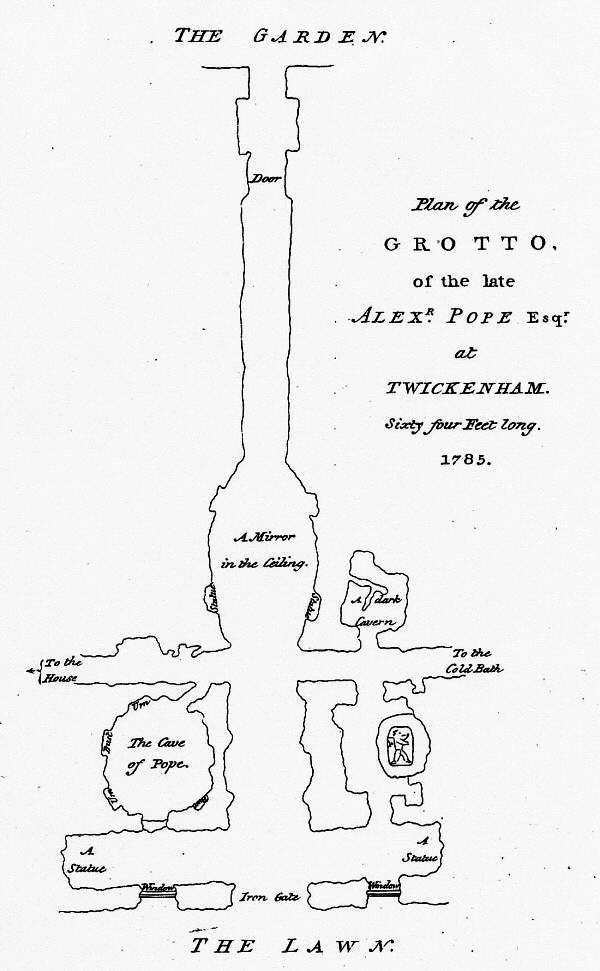
Plan of Pope's Grotto by Samuel Lewis, 1785

Originally the grotto was intended to appear natural. In 1725 Pope wrote to his friend Edward Blount of Blagdon, Paignton in Devon:

I have put the last hand to my works ... happily finishing the subterraneous Way and Grotto: I then found a spring of the clearest water, which falls in a perpetual Rill, that echoes thru' the Cavern day and night. ...When you shut the Doors of this Grotto, it becomes on the instant, from a luminous Room, a Camera Obscura, on the walls of which all the objects of the River, Hills, Woods, and Boats, are forming a moving Picture ... And when you have a mind to light it up, it affords you a very different Scene: it is finished with Shells interspersed with Pieces of Looking-glass in angular Forms ... at which when a Lamp ...is hung in the Middle, a thousand pointed Rays glitter and are reflected over the place.

Pope supposedly said, "Were it to have nymphs as well – it would be complete in everything." The chamber at the west end where the spring was located has since been destroyed.

In 1739 Pope visited a spa at the Avon Gorge and decided to transform the grotto to resemble a mine. For four years he redecorated it with marble, alabaster, colourful ores such as mundic and snakestones, stalactites, crystals, and diamonds from Bristol and Cornwall, much of it supplied by William Borlase, a Cornish geologist. Sir Hans Sloane gave Pope two "joints" of basalt from the Giant's Causeway, one of which is still in the grotto. He also received a stalagmite from Wookey Hole, giving rise to a false rumour which has persisted into the 21st century that he hired locals to shoot stalactites from the roof of the Witches' Cavern.

After Pope's death in 1744, the grotto became popular with tourists, many of whom are said to have taken parts of the decoration away as souvenirs.

Most of the grotto survives under 20th-century buildings. It was made a Grade II* listed building on 2 September 1952. It now consists of a loggia and a central room with north and south "chapels" branching from it; little survives of the rustic arcades and columns and other decoration from Pope's time, and the existing religious decorations—a carved stone in the ceiling of the loggia representing the Crown of Thorns, a shield with the Five Wounds of Christ above the arch leading to the main room and statues of the Virgin Mary and of St James of Compostella in the two "chapels"—are all believed to be 19th-century. The tunnel which led to the garden has been widened and lengthened. The grotto has been restored and will open to the public for 30 weekends a year from 2023 under the auspices of the Pope's Grotto Preservation Trust.

== Current use ==
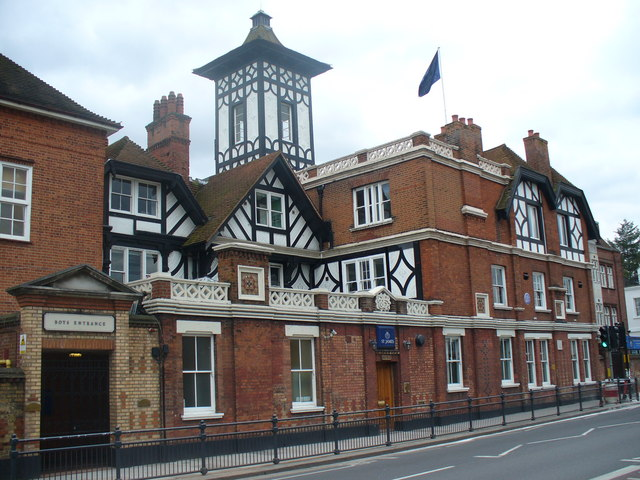
The site of Pope's Villa in 2009

Thomas Young, a tea merchant, came into possession of the property in 1842 and had a 'Tudor Gothic' house built on the site of Pope's villa, designed by Henry Edward Kendall Jr. This was completed c. 1845. It has been a school since 1919, first St. Catherine's Convent School and convent, since 2010 Radnor House Independent School, and has been substantially altered.
