= Pope's Villa at Twickenham =

Painting by J. M. W. Turner

- Artist: J. M. W. Turner
- Year: 1808
- Type: Oil on canvas, landscape painting
- Dimensions: 92 cm × 122.5 cm (36 in × 48.2 in)
- Location: Private collection

Pope's Villa at Twickenham is an 1808 landscape painting by the British artist J.M.W. Turner. It depicts a view along the River Thames at Twickenham towards Pope's villa, the riverfront former home of the poet Alexander Pope. The property had survived for more than sixty years after Pope's death but was pulled down the previous year by Lady Howe

It was displayed at Turner's own studio gallery in Queen Anne Street rather than at the Royal Academy. The work was purchased by the art collector Sir John Leicester for two hundred guineas. For many years the painting was in the collection of the Sudeley Castle in Gloucestershire but was sold in 2008 for £4.5 million. It was sold again at Christie's in 2023.

== See also ==
- List of paintings by J. M. W. Turner
- A View of Alexander Pope's Villa, Twickenham, a 1759 painting by Samuel Scott

== Bibliography ==
- Bailey, Anthony. J.M.W. Turner: Standing in the Sun. Tate Enterprises Ltd, 2013.
- Hamilton, James. Turner - A Life. Sceptre, 1998.
- Hunt, John Dixon. Gardens and the Picturesque: Studies in the History of Landscape Architecture. MIT Press, 1992.
- Shanes, Eric. The Life and Masterworks of J.M.W. Turner. Parkstone International, 2012.
- Smiles, Sam. J. M. W. Turner: The Making of a Modern Artist. Manchester University Press, 2017.
