= Lord Anson's Victory off Cape Finisterre =

Painting by Samuel Scott

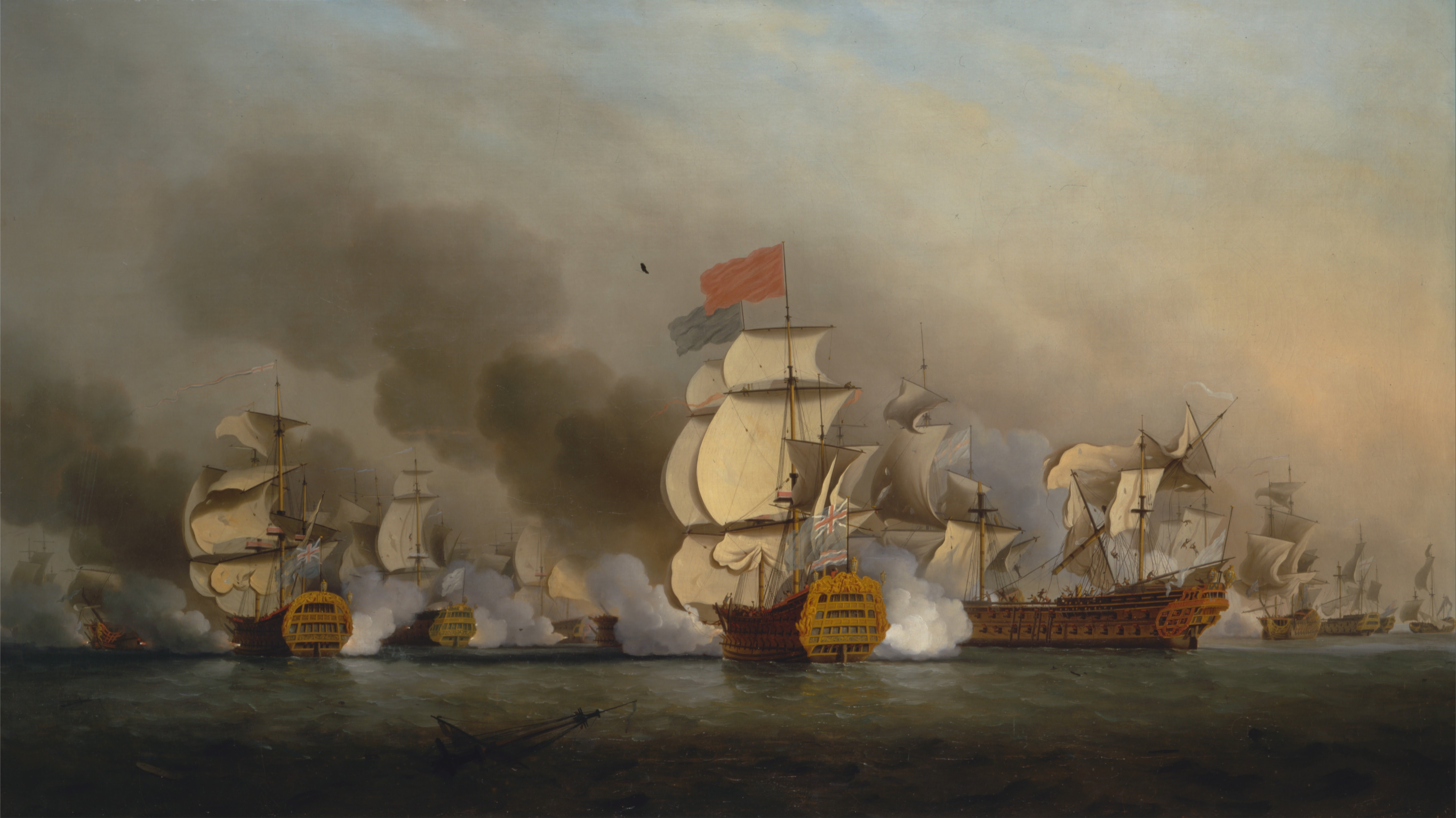
- Artist: Samuel Scott
- Year: 1749
- Type: Oil on canvas
- Dimensions: 101.6 cm × 180.3 cm (40.0 in × 71.0 in)
- Location: Yale Center for British Art, New Haven

Lord Anson's Victory off Cape Finisterre is an oil on canvas history painting by the English artist Samuel Scott, from 1749.

== History and description ==
A seascape, it depicts the First Battle of Cape Finisterre on 14 May 1747 where the British Royal Navy under George Anson, 1st Baron Anson intercepted a French convoy of merchantmen and its French Navy escort. A major British success during the latter stages of the War of the Austrian Succession, it saw Anson raised to the peerage as Baron Anson.

During the early stages of his career Scott was influenced by Willem van de Velde the Younger and the composition resembles the latter's 1687 painting The Battle of Texel. Anson's flagship Prince George is in the centre of the painting. Scott condensed the events of the battle into a composite view. Several versions were produced by Scott including one commissioned by Anson's wife for the family's country house at Shugborough Hall in Staffordshire, which is now in the Yale Center for British Art. Another version exists in the National Maritime Museum in Greenwich.

== Bibliography ==
- Einberg, Elizabeth Egerton, Judy. The Age of Hogarth: British Painters Born 1675-1709. Tate Gallery, 1988.
- Tracy, Nicholas. Nelson's Battles: The Art of Victory in the Age of Sail. Chatham, 1996.
