= The Thames and the Tower of London =

Painting by Samuel Scott

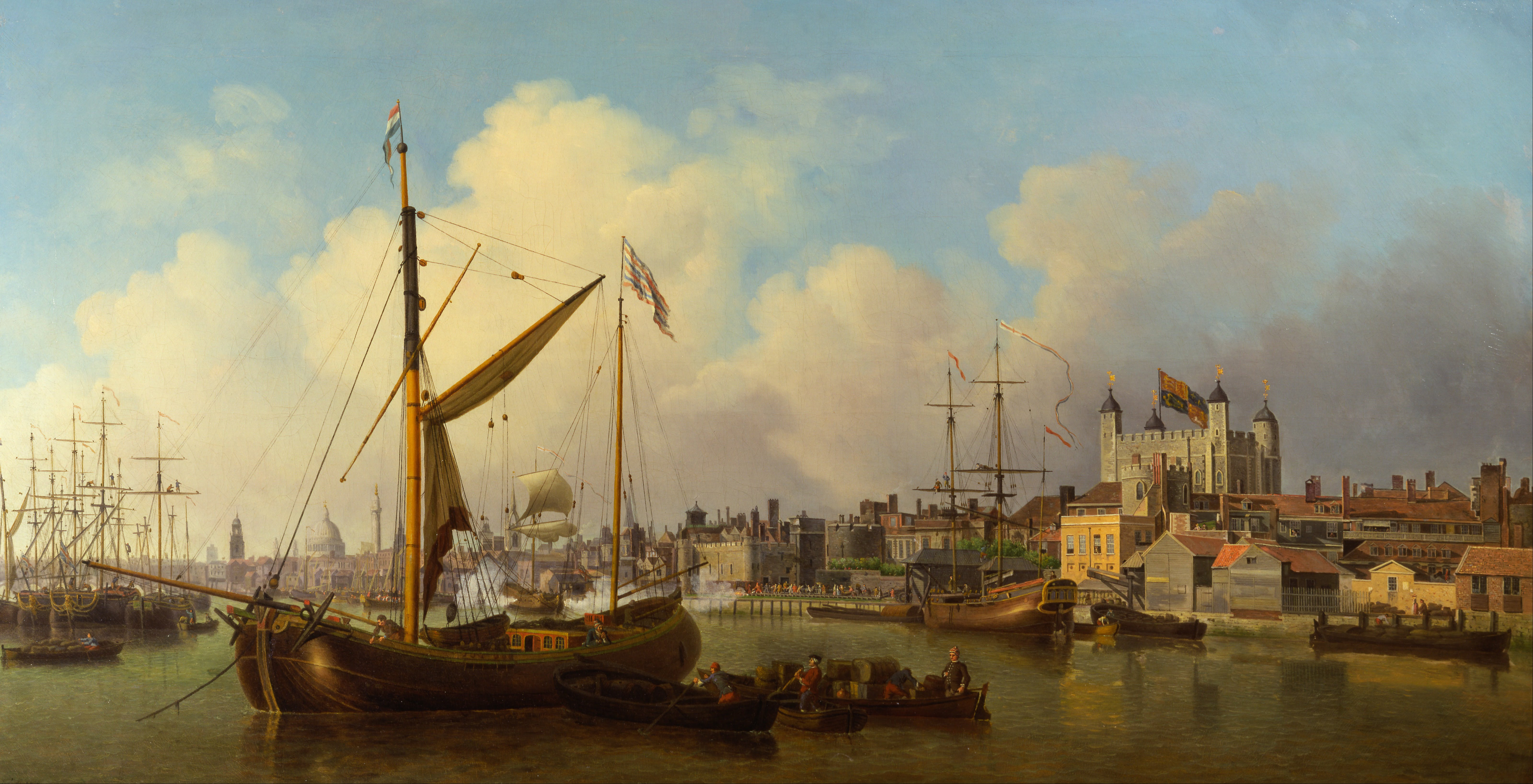
- Artist: Samuel Scott
- Year: 1771
- Type: Oil on canvas, landscape painting
- Dimensions: 101 cm × 193 cm (40 in × 76 in)
- Location: Yale Center for British Art; Connecticut

The Thames and the Tower of London is a 1771 landscape painting by the British artist Samuel Scott. A cityscape, it shows a view across looking northwards across the River Thames towards the Tower of London. In the City of London beyond it the Monument and St Paul's Cathedral can be seen.

It was displayed at the Royal Academy Exhibition of 1771 in Pall Mall, the only painting Scott ever exhibited at the Academy having displayed his works at the Society of Artists of Great Britain. Today it is in the possession of the Yale Center for British Art in Connecticut, having been acquired as part of the Paul Mellon Collection. An alternative version is at Felbrigg Hall in Norfolk

== Bibliography ==
- Hermann, Luke. British Landscape Painting of the Eighteenth Century. Oxford University Press, 1974.
- Porter, Stephen. London A History in Paintings & Illustrations. Amberley Publishing, 2014.
