= Portrait of Samuel Scott =

Painting by Thomas Hudson

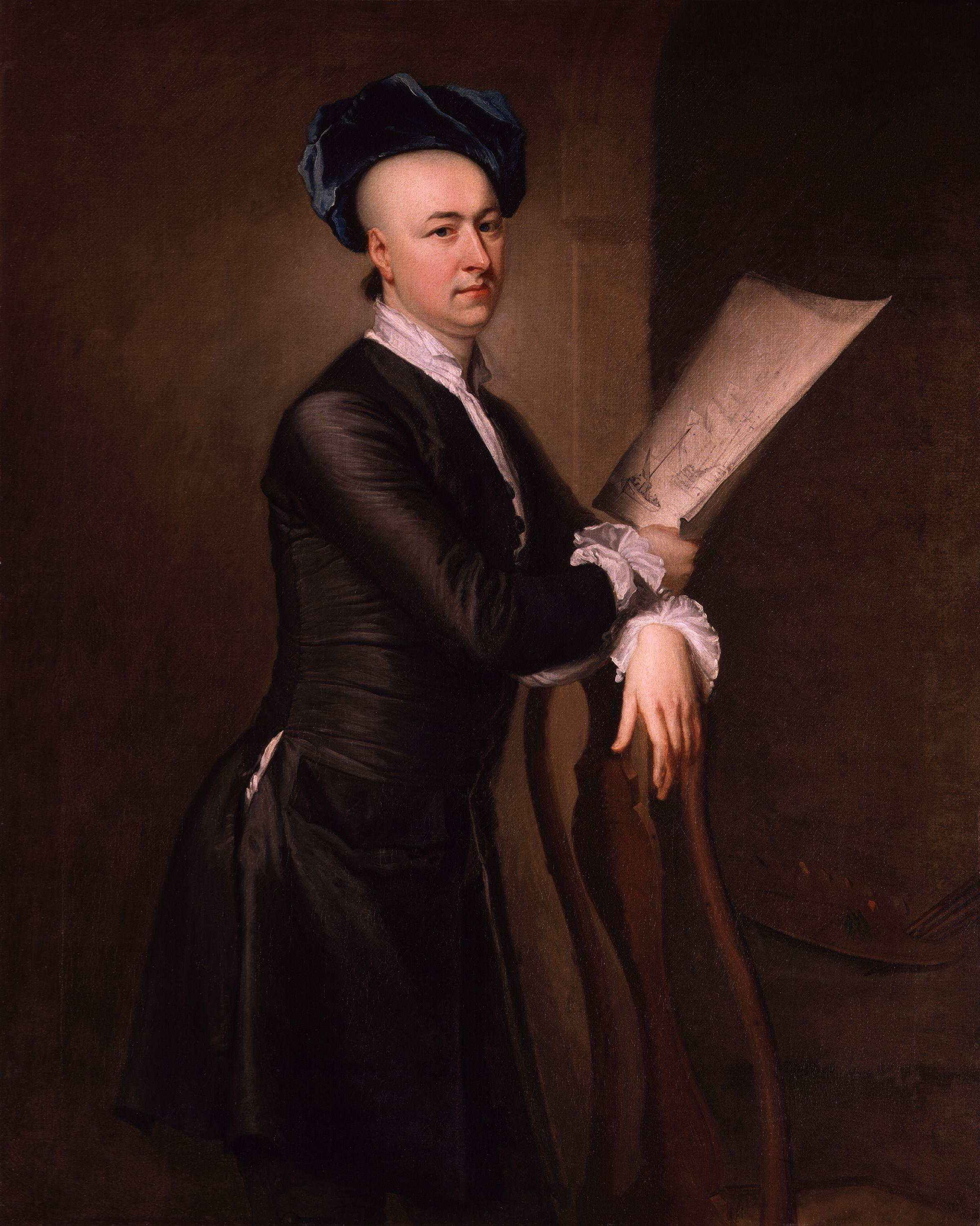
- Artist: Thomas Hudson
- Year: c. 1733
- Type: Oil on canvas, portrait painting
- Dimensions: 122 cm × 97.8 cm (48 in × 38.5 in)
- Location: Tate Britain; London

Portrait of Samuel Scott is an oil on canvas portrait painting by the English artist Thomas Hudson, from c. 1733. It is held in the Tate Britain, in London.

== History and description ==
It depicts his fellow painter Samuel Scott, shown informally leaning against the back of a chair and holding a drawing of a ship. Scott built his reputation as a marine painter, but later switched to producing cityscape views of the River Thames in London following the enormous success that Canaletto had enjoyed with similar scenes.

Hudson, a former pupil of Jonathan Richardson, emerged as a leading portraitist of the mid-eighteenth century, although this is one of his earliest known works. The painting may have been intended to promote the careers of both Hudson and Scott. Following their later success, they bouth bought riverside villas in Twickenham where they were near neighbours. Today the painting is in the collection of the Tate Britain, in London, having been purchased in 1886. The engraver John Faber produced a mezzotint based on it.

== Bibliography ==
- Einberg, Elizabeth and Egerton, Judy. The Age of Hogarth: British Painters Born 1675–1709. Tate Gallery, 1988.
