= A View of Alexander Pope's Villa, Twickenham =

Painting by Samuel Scott

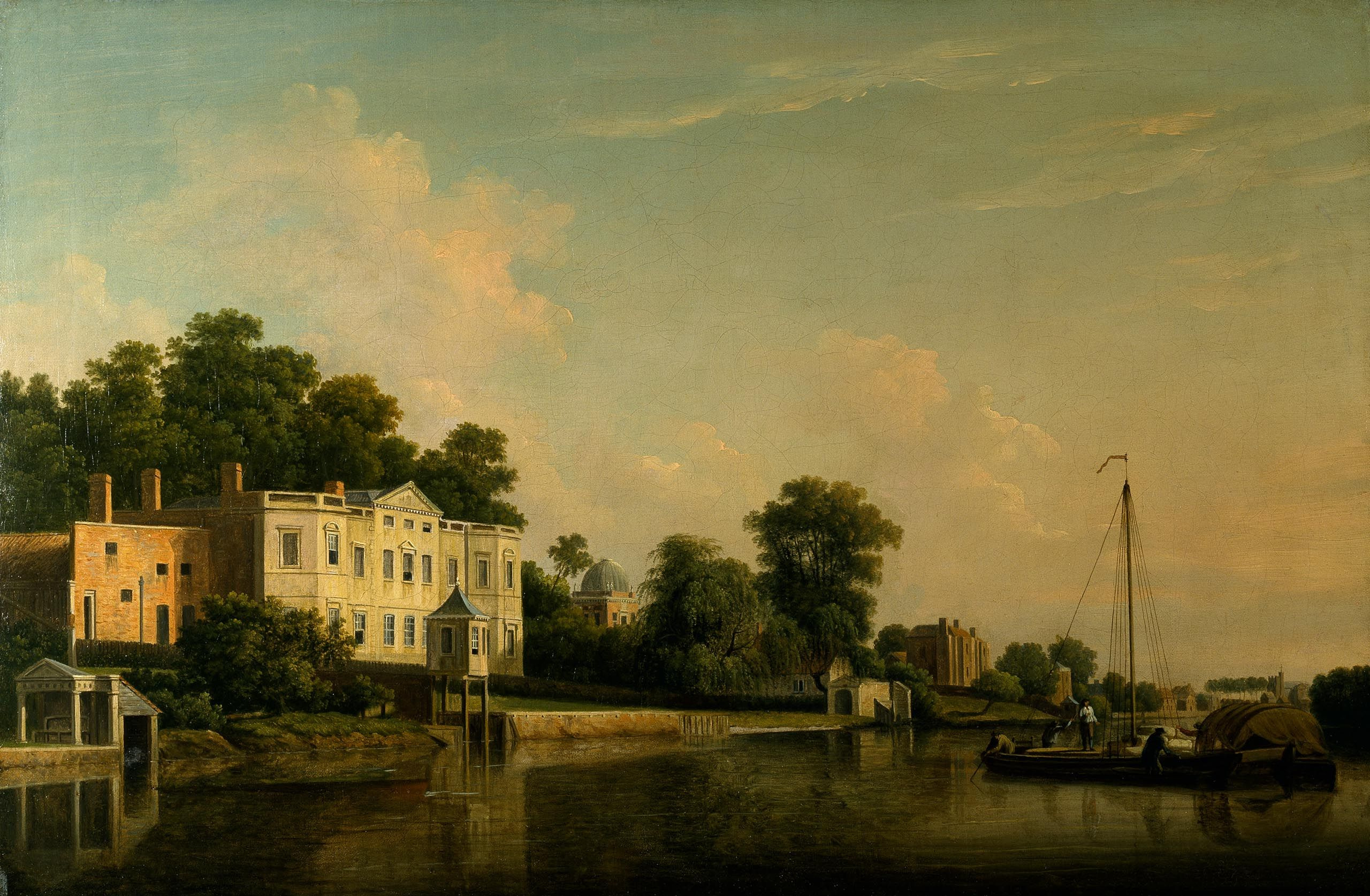
- Artist: Samuel Scott
- Year: 1759
- Type: Oil on canvas, landscape painting
- Dimensions: 50.8 cm × 78.5 cm (20.0 in × 30.9 in)
- Location: Denver Art Museum; Colorado

A View of Alexander Pope's Villa, Twickenham is a c.1759 landscape painting by the British artist Samuel Scott. It depicts a view of Pope's Villa on the River Thames at Twickenham, then some miles to the west of London. It had belonged to the poet Alexander Pope earlier in the century and was a popular landmark.

Scott also lived in Twickenham, which featured in a number of his paintings. The original is now in the collection of the Denver Art Museum in Colorado. Several other versions of the painting now exist, including a smaller version in the Yale Center for British Art and one in the Orleans House Gallery.

== See also ==
- Pope's Villa at Twickenham, an 1808 painting by J.M.W. Turner
