= French Firerafts Attacking the British Fleet off Quebec =

Painting by Samuel Scott

- Artist: Samuel Scott
- Year: 1767
- Type: Oil on canvas, history painting
- Dimensions: 116 cm × 215 cm (46 in × 85 in)
- Location: National Maritime Museum, Greenwich

French Firerafts Attacking the British Fleet off Quebec is an oil on canvas history painting by the English painter Samuel Scott, from 1767.

== History and description ==
It depicts a scene on 28 June 1759 during the Siege of Quebec in New France. In an attempt to drive off the Royal Navy fleet Charles Saunders in the Saint Lawrence River the French launched a bunch of fire rafts in the direction of the fleet. As with an earlier fireship attack, serious destruction was avoided when British crewmen were able to tow the flaming rafts to safety. The failure of the fireship was a major blow to French morale.

Scott depicted both fire attacks on the fleet. This view looks from the north across the Île d'Orléans, visible in the bottom right of the painting. Quebec City is on the right while the rafts, billowing flame and smoke, are being intercepted by the ship's boats of the British fleet. To the left are the warships of the British fleet with HMS Stirling Castle, the flagship of Saunders, closest to the centre.

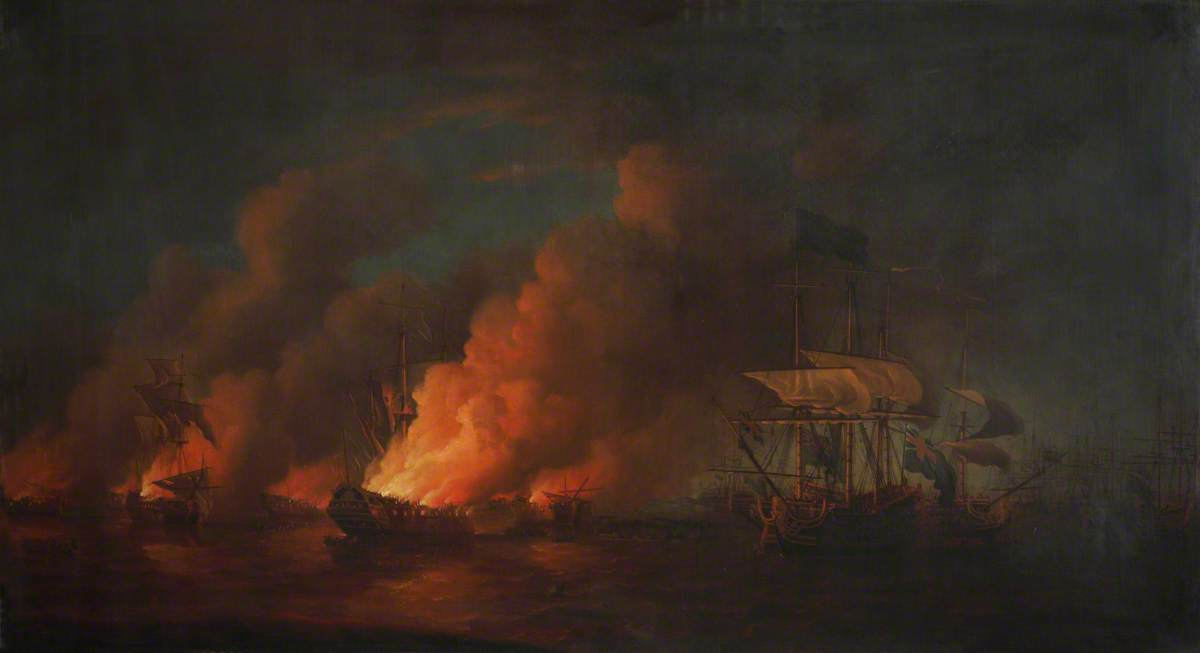
French Fireships Attacking the English Fleet off Quebec, 1767

The painting is today in the collection of the National Maritime Museum in Greenwich as is the artist's companion work, French Fireships Attacking the English Fleet off Quebec.

== Bibliography ==
- Bonehill, John. (ed.) Art for the Nation: The Oil Paintings Collections of the National Maritime Museum. National Maritime Museum, 2006.
- Colville, Quintin. Nelson, Navy & Nation: The Royal Navy and the British people, 1688-1815. Bloomsbury Publishing, 2013.
- Harrington, Peter. British Artists and War: The Face of Battle in Paintings and Prints, 1700-1914. Greenhill Books, 1993.
- McLynn, Frank. 1759: The Year Britain Became Master of the World. Random House, 2011.
