= A Danish Timber Bark Getting Under Way =

Painting by Samuel Scott

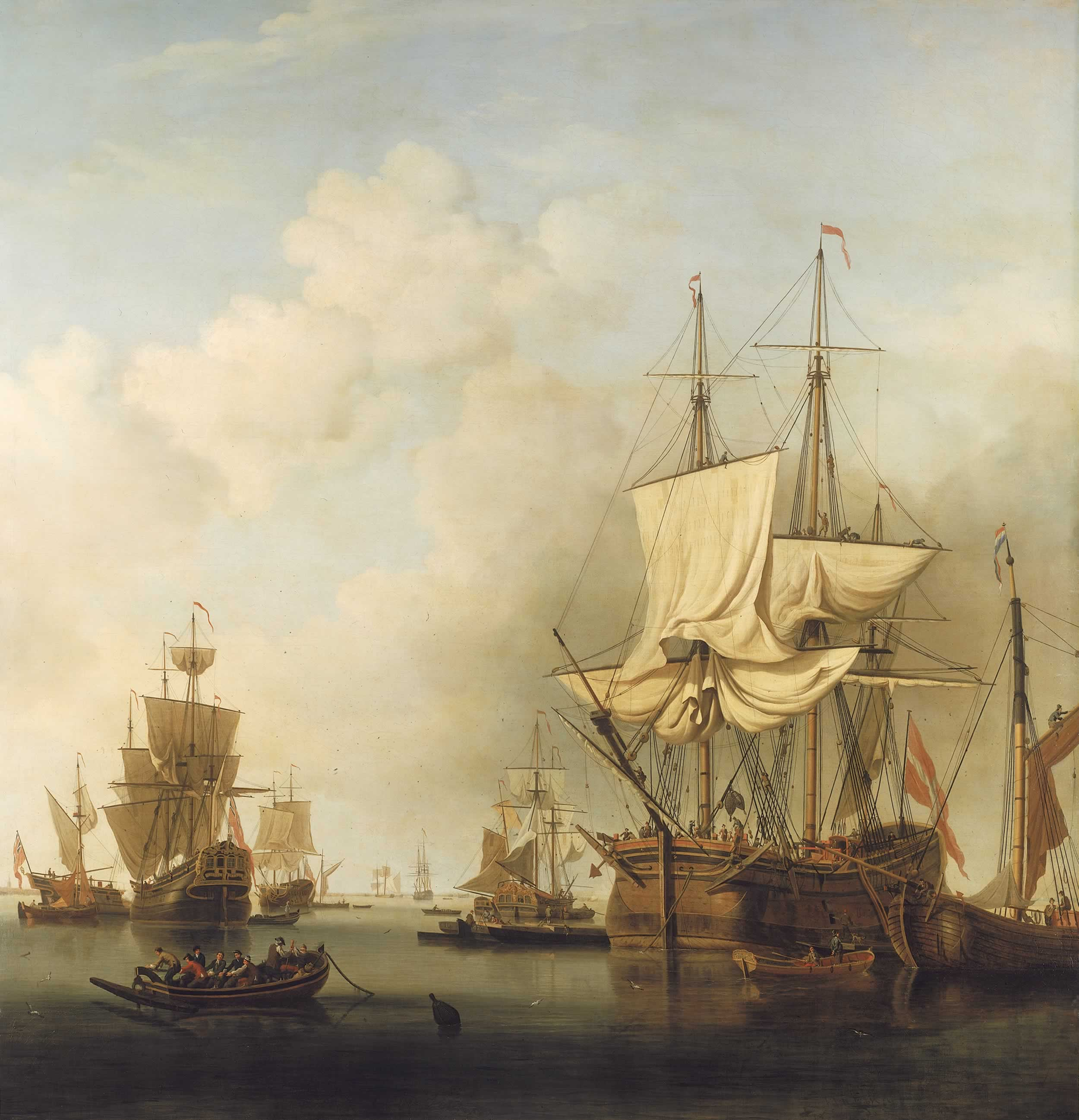
- Artist: Samuel Scott
- Year: 1736
- Type: Oil on canvas maritime painting
- Dimensions: 227.3 cm × 218.4 cm (89.5 in × 86.0 in)
- Location: National Maritime Museum, Greenwich

A Danish Timber Bark Getting Under Way is a 1736 maritime painting by the British artist Samuel Scott. It depicts a Danish merchant bark loaded with timber departing, likely near Gravesend. Scott was best known for his seascapes in his early career, but following the commercial success of Canaletto's views of the River Thames he increasingly switched to depictions of London on the river. Today the painting is in the collection of the National Maritime Museum in Greenwich.

== Bibliography ==
- Bonehill, John. (ed.) Art for the Nation: The Oil Paintings Collections of the National Maritime Museum. National Maritime Museum, 2006.
- Cordingly, David. Marine Painting in England, 1700-1900. 1974.
