= A Thames Wharf =

Painting by Samuel Scott

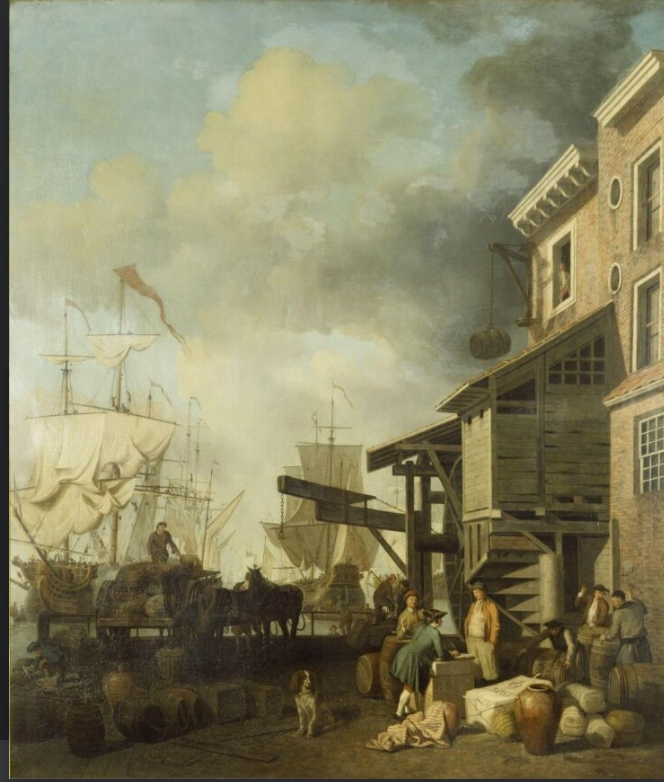
- Artist: Samuel Scott
- Year: c. 1757
- Type: Oil on canvas, landscape painting
- Dimensions: 160 cm × 137.1 cm (63 in × 54.0 in)
- Location: Victoria and Albert Museum; London

A Thames Wharf is an oil on canvas landscape painting by the British artist Samuel Scott, from c. 1757. It depicts a wharf on the River Thames in London, owned by the East India Company. It is sometimes identified as the Old East India Wharf. It features a treadwheel crane, a common feature on the London riverside of the time. Scott was originally a painted marine subjects, but he later focused on painting views of London.

Today it is in the collection of the Victoria and Albert Museum in London, having been acquired in 1865.

== Bibliography ==
- Harris, Lynn Brenda & Johnson, Valerie Ann (ed.) Excavating the Histories of Slave-Trade and Pirate Ships: Property, Plunder and Loss. Springer Nature, 2022.
- Ellis, Markman, Coulton, Richard & Mauger, Matthew. Empire of Tea: The Asian Leaf that Conquered the World. Reaktion Books, 2015.
- Roe, Sonia. Oil Paintings in Public Ownership in the Victoria and Albert Museum. Public Catalogue Foundation, 2008.
- Spence, Craig. Accidents and Violent Death in Early Modern London, 1650-1750. Boydell & Brewer, 2016.
