= Old London Bridge (painting) =

Painting by Samuel Scott

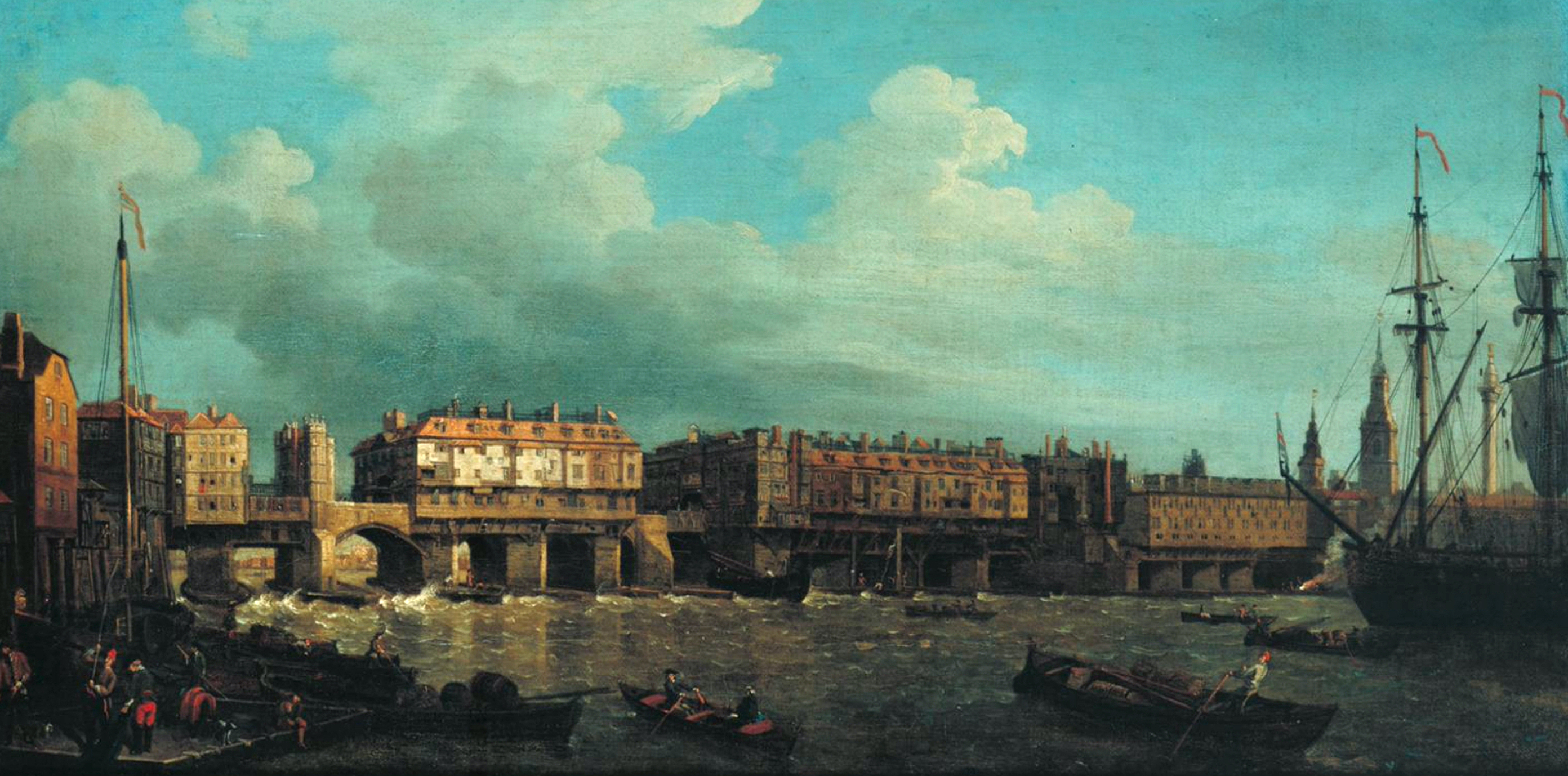
- Artist: Samuel Scott
- Year: c. 1758
- Type: Oil on canvas, landscape painting
- Dimensions: 28.6 cm × 54.6 cm (11.3 in × 21.5 in)
- Location: Tate Britain; London

Old London Bridge is an oil painting by the English artist Samuel Scott, from c.1758. It features a cityscape with a view of London Bridge shortly before the medieval era bridge with its buildings was demolished in 1760 and replaced.

== History and description ==
Scott was a leading maritime painter, but following the commercial success of Canaletto with his scenes of the River Thames, Scott switched to painting views of London. A number of different versions exist of the painting, some dating back to the 1740s. it was a popular depiction and was alao engraved. One version is in the Museum of the Bank of England. Another is in the collection of the Tate Britain in Pimlico, having been acquired through a donation to the National Gallery by Robert Vernon in 1847 as part of the Vernon Gift.

== Bibliography ==
- Baetjer, Katharine. British Paintings in the Metropolitan Museum of Art, 1575-1875. Metropolitan Museum of Art, 2009.
- Leapman, Michael. London's River:A History of the Thames. Pavillion, 2008.
