= Samuel Scott (painter) =

English painter (1702–1772)

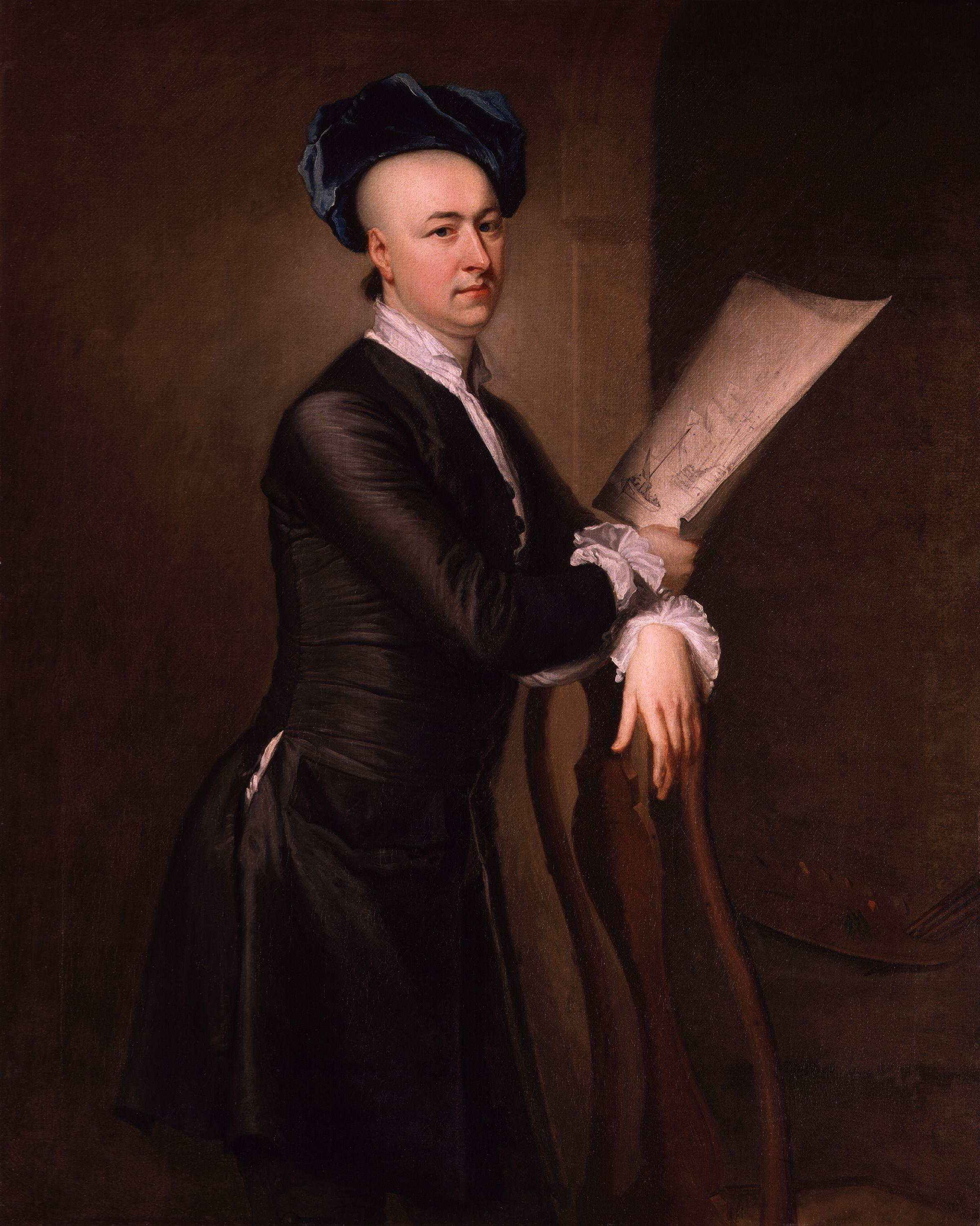
- Portrait of Samuel Scott by Thomas Hudson, c. 1733
- Born: c. 1702; London, England
- Died: 12 October 1772 (aged 69–70); Bath, Somerset
- Children: 1

Samuel Scott (c. 1702 – 12 October 1772) was an English painter who specialised in landscape painting and marine art.

== Early life ==
Scott was born in London, and began painting around 1720. Nothing is known of his artistic training. He started as a maritime artist, painting men-of-war and other ships on calm seas in the style of Willem van de Velde, many of whose drawings he owned. He also painted a set of six pictures of settlements owned by the East India Company in collaboration with George Lambert. Scott painted the ships, Lambert the buildings and landscape. Writing in 1733, George Vertue included Scott among London's "most elevated men in art". Around this time he posed for the Portrait of Samuel Scott by Thomas Hudson.

From 27 to 31 May 1732, he made a celebrated "Five days' Peregrination" to the Medway estuary and the Isle of Sheppey in company with William Hogarth and others. An account of their trip was written by Ebenezer Forrest and eventually published in 1782, with engravings taken from drawings by Hogarth and Scott.

In the early 1740s, Scott began making sketches of London, especially of the new Westminster Bridge, then under construction. When, following the arrival of Canaletto in London in 1746, paintings of views of the city became fashionable, he began working the sketches up into oil paintings. He painted at least eleven versions of a view of the Old London Bridge, the earliest dating from 1747. Scott continued to paint copies of it after 1757, when the houses lining the bridge, shown in the painting, had been demolished. The London Bridge pictures were often painted as one of a pair, with an image of the Tower of London or Westminster Bridge as a pendant.

== Later life ==
Between 1761 and 1771, he exhibited three works at the Society of Artists, one at the Free Society of artists, and one, The Thames and the Tower of London, at the Royal Academy's Exhibition of 1771. He was one of the early draughtsmen in watercolours, and was called the father of English watercolour, but his chief works were in oil. Some of Scott's most celebrated paintings were his depictions of scenes during the War of Jenkins' Ear. Scott earned a considerable reputation for his shore and river scenes, which were well-drawn and painted, and enlivened with figures. Horace Walpole, who had a large collection of his works, said that they "will charm in every age" and that "if he was second to Vandeveldt in sea pieces, he excelled him in variety." His views of London Bridge, the Custom-house Quay, and other pictures of the Thames earned him the name "the English Canaletto".

Scott lived at number 2 Henrietta Street, Covent Garden, overlooking the Piazza at Covent Garden, from 1747 to 1758. He moved to Twickenham in 1758, and then to Ludlow, where his daughter was living, before retiring to Bath, where he died in Walcot Street, of gout, on 12 October 1772, leaving one daughter. His collection was sold by Langford in January 1773.

William Marlow (1740–1813) and the animal painter Sawrey Gilpin (1733–1807) were his pupils. Marlow produced similar scenes of the Thames to Scott, and later acquired his former villa at Twickenham.

== Gallery ==
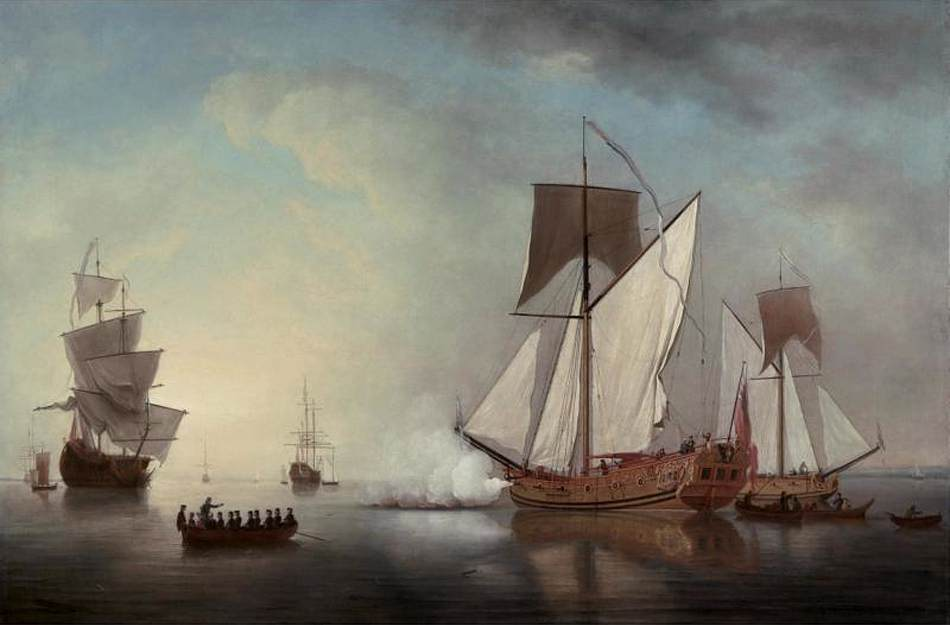
Departure from England of Francis, Duke of Lorraine, 1732

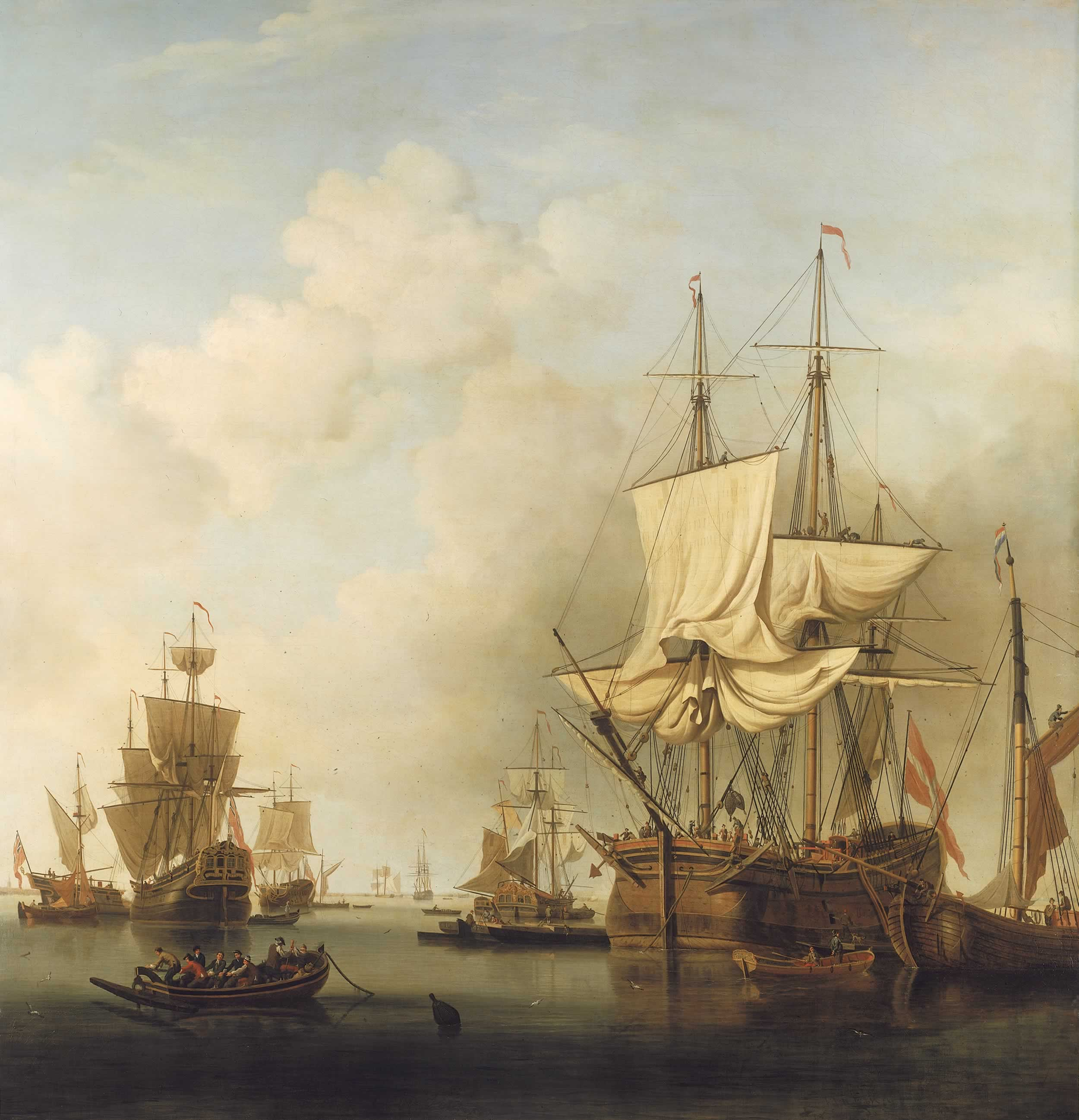
A Danish Timber Bark Getting Under Way, 1736

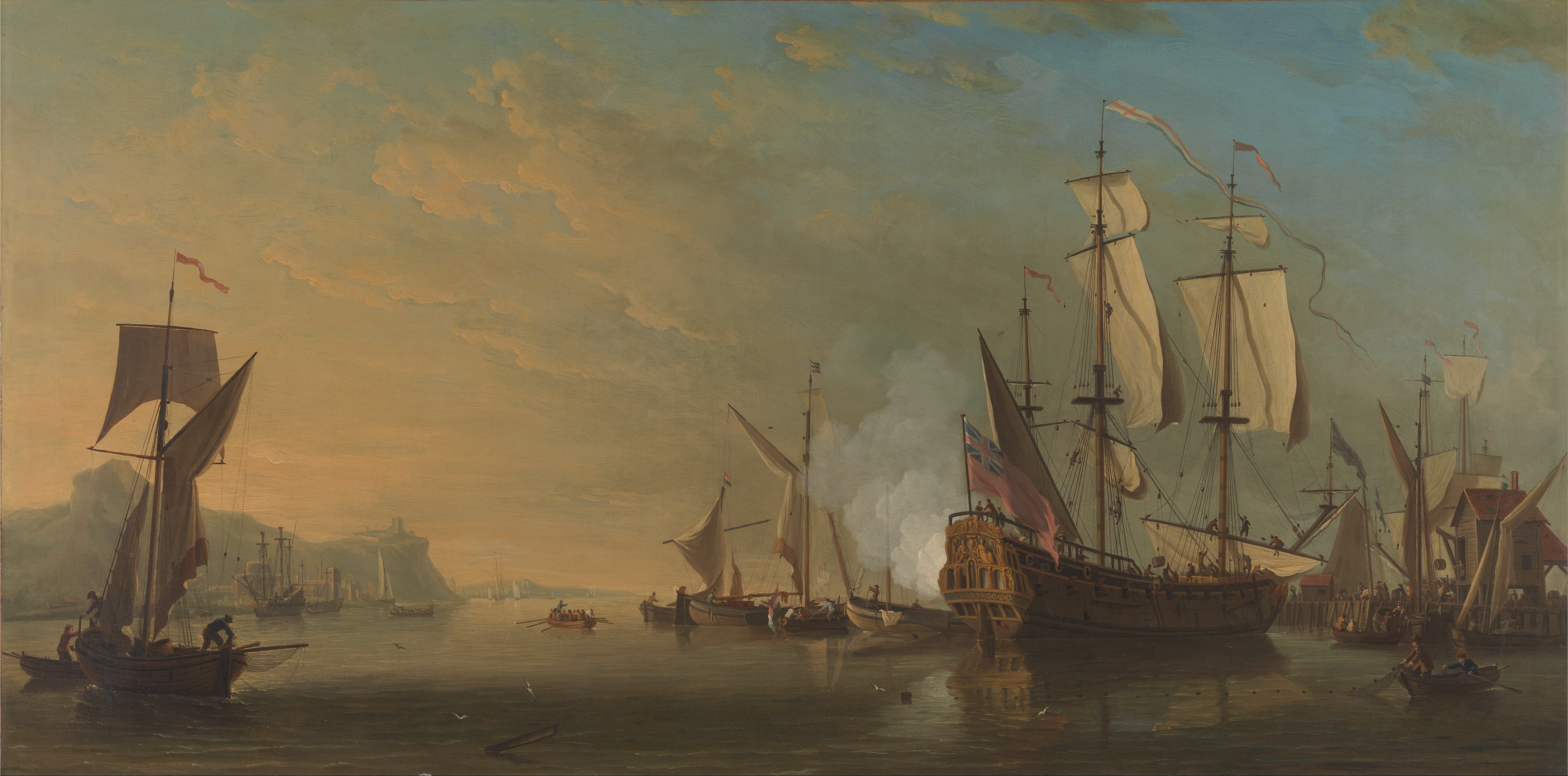
Shipping off Dover, 1738

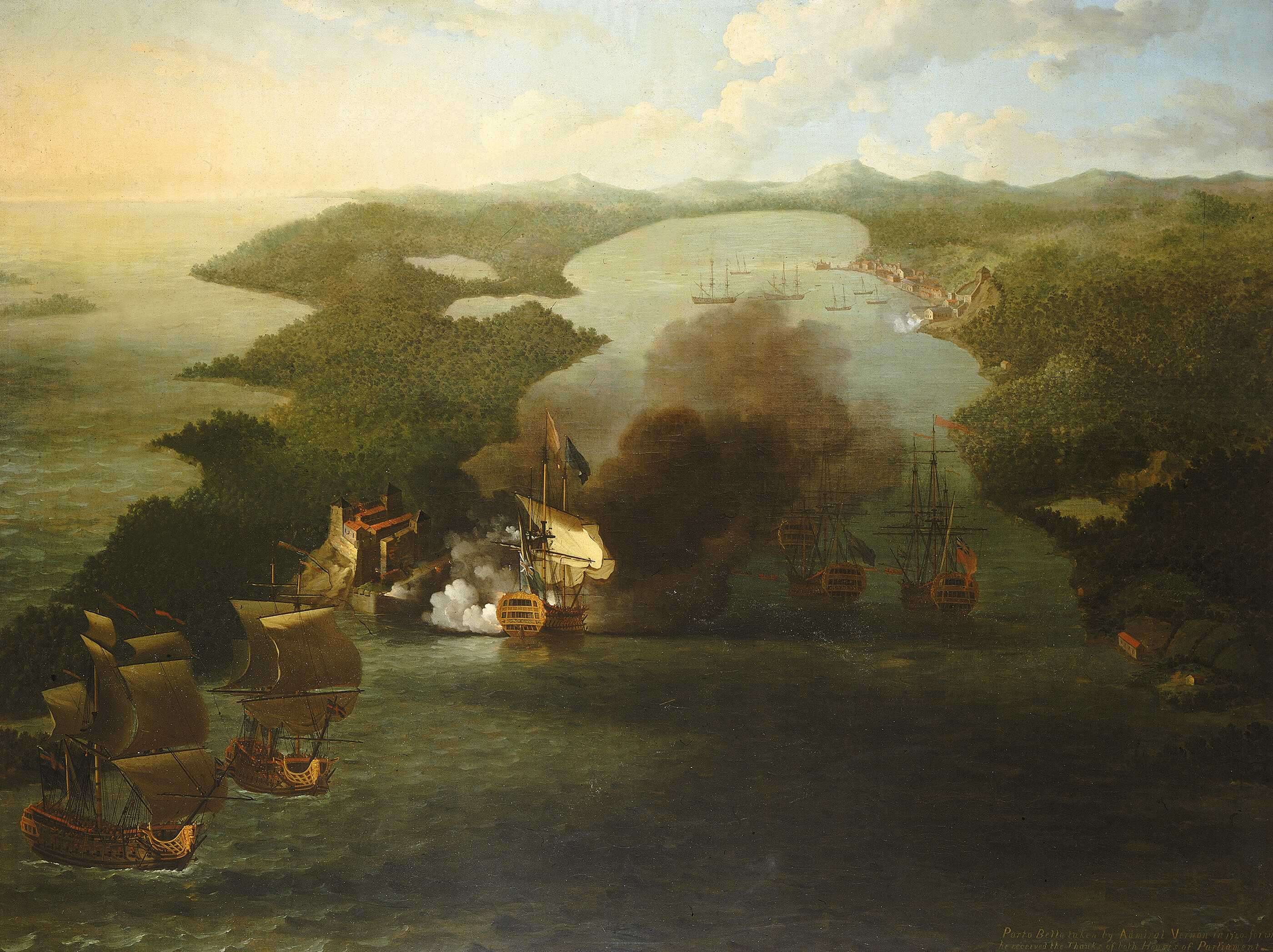
The Capture of Puerto Bello, 1740

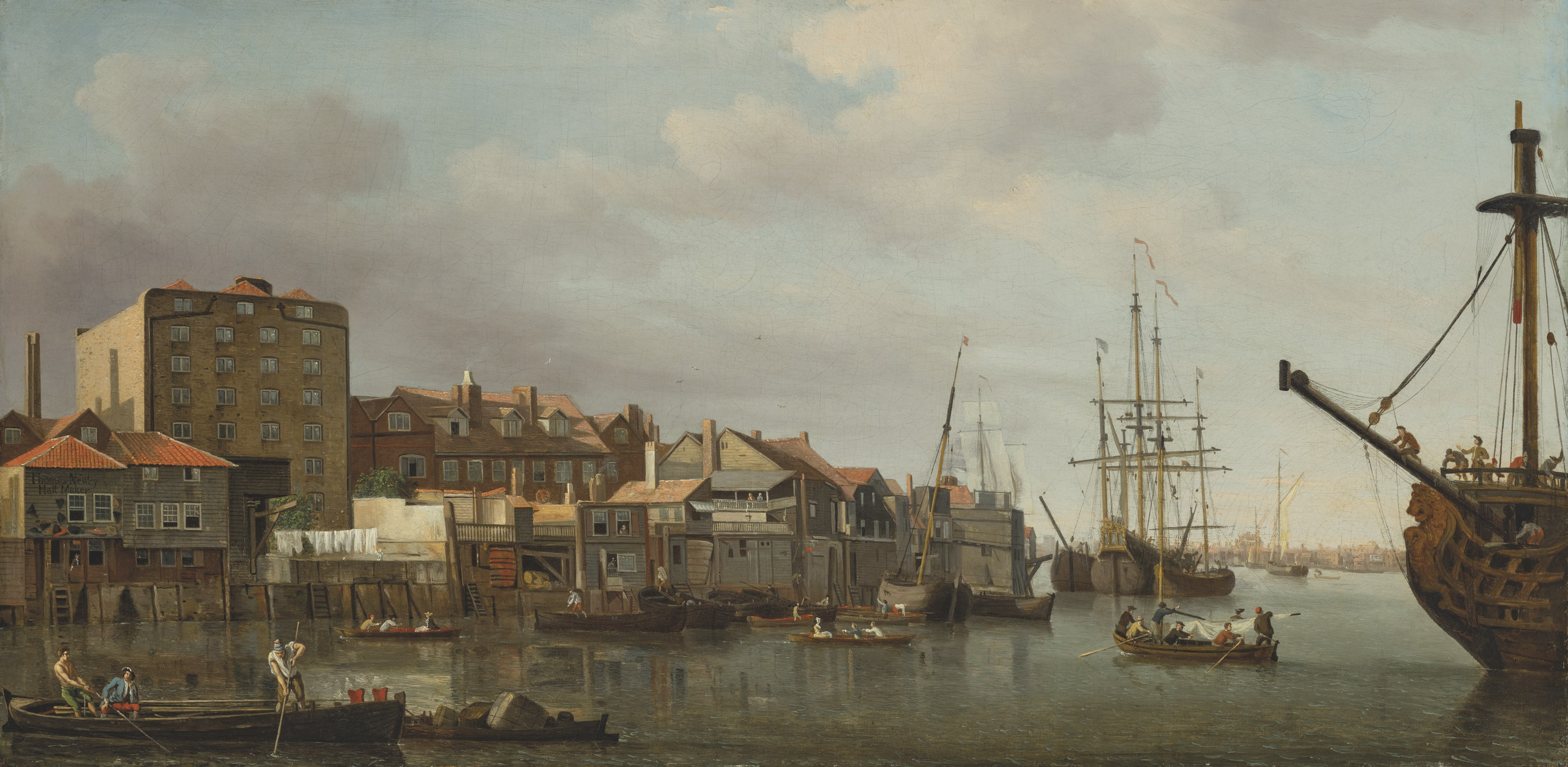
The Thames at Wapping, c.1740

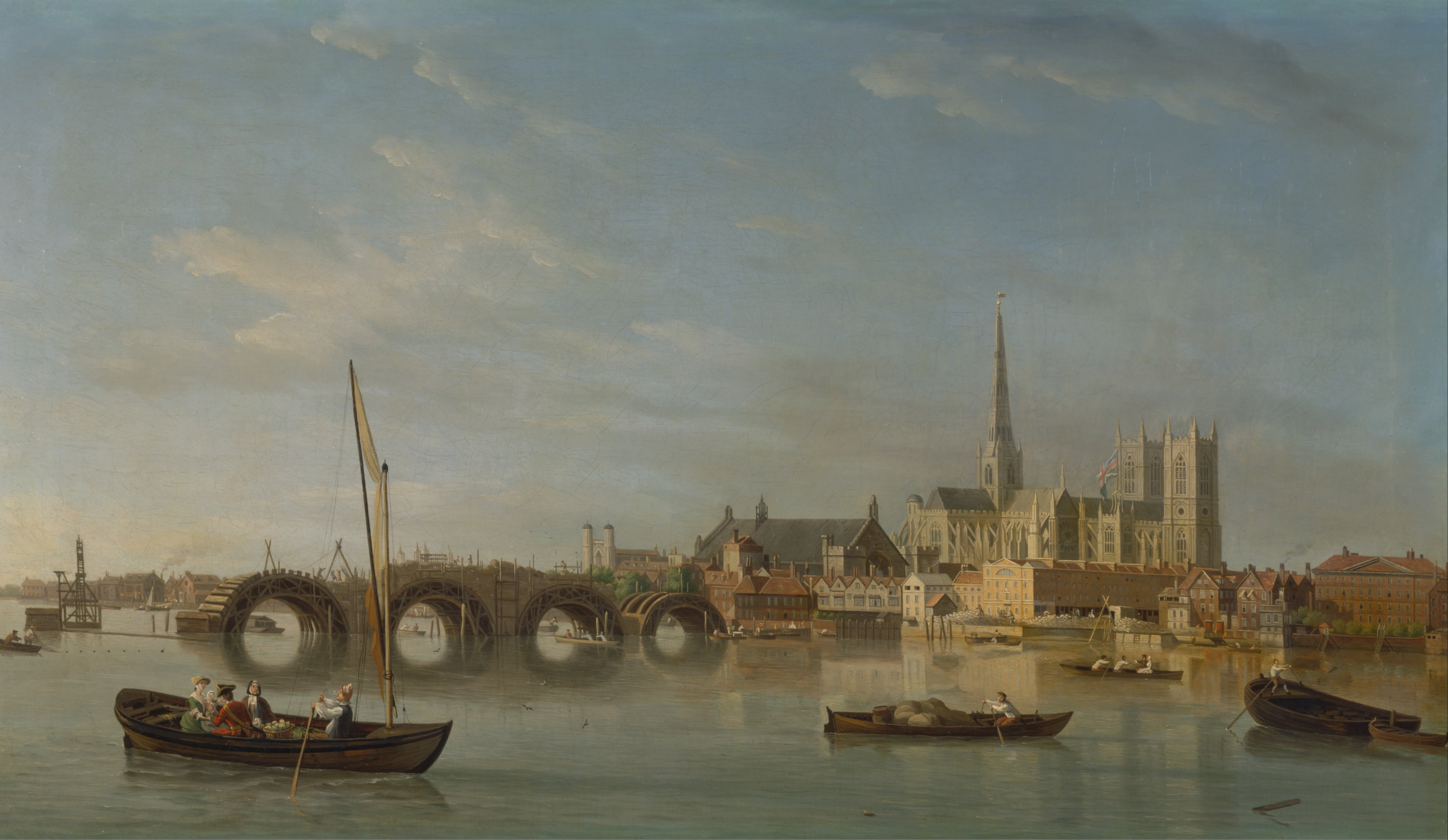
The Building of Westminster Bridge, 1742

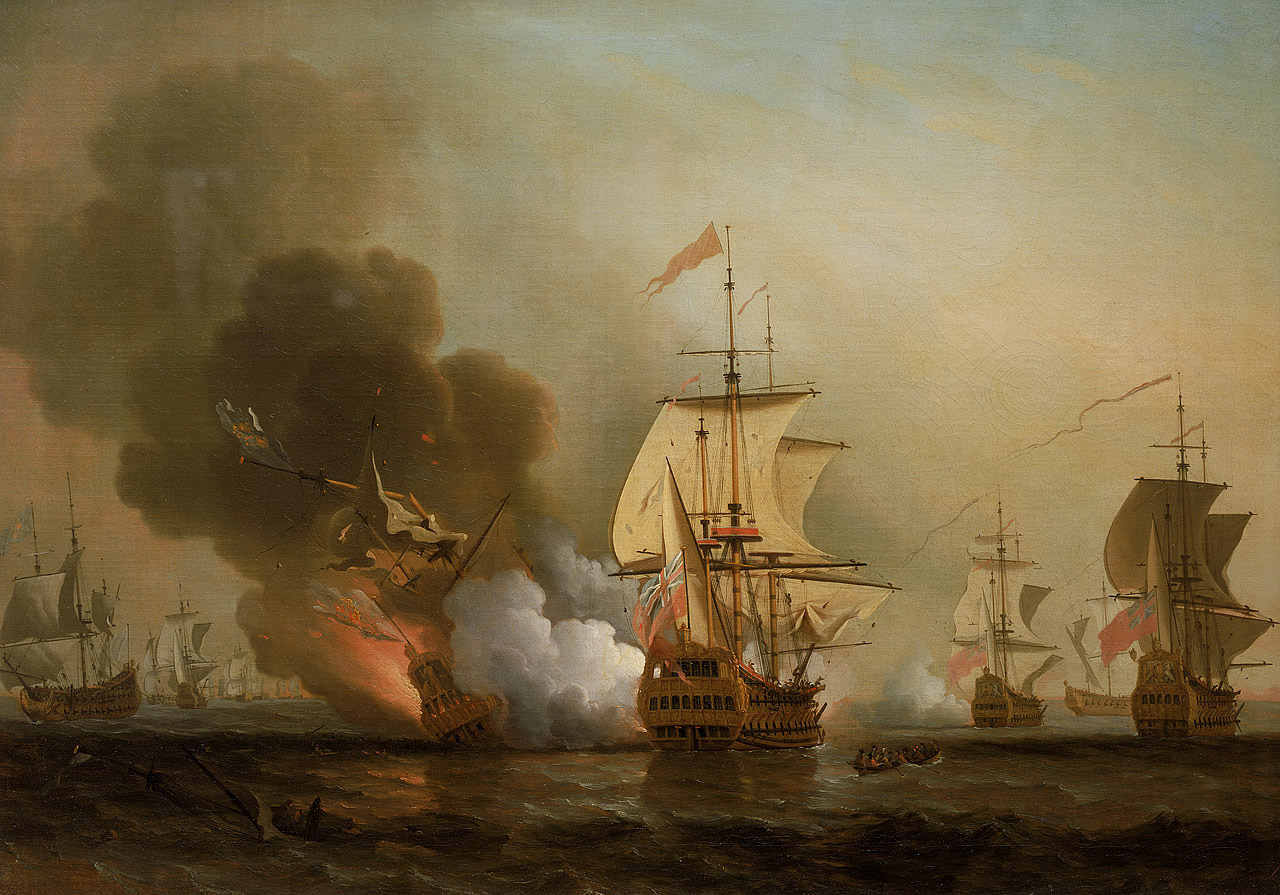
Wager's Action off Cartagena, c. 1747

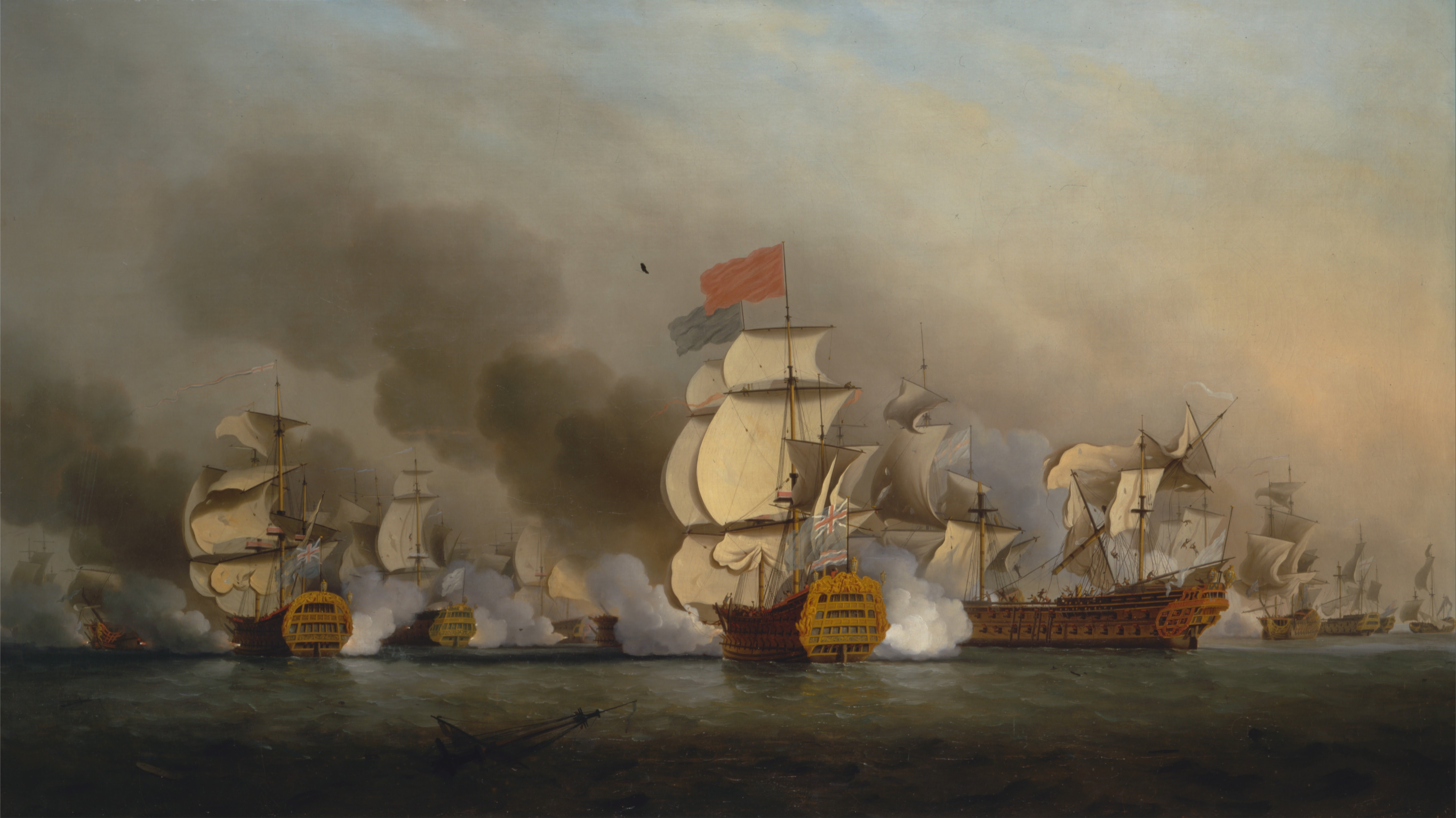
Lord Anson's Victory off Cape Finisterre, 1749

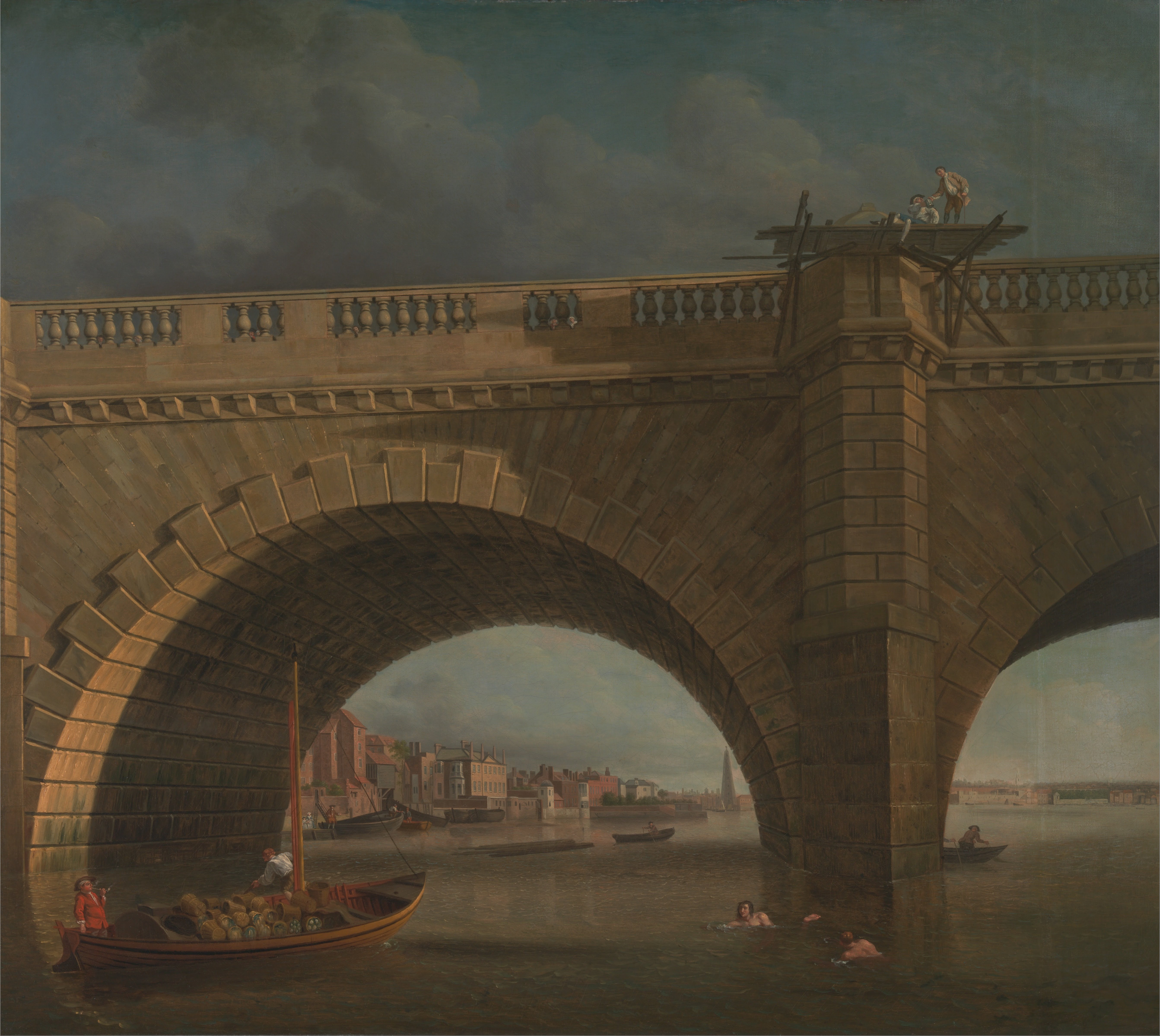
An Arch of Westminster Bridge, 1750

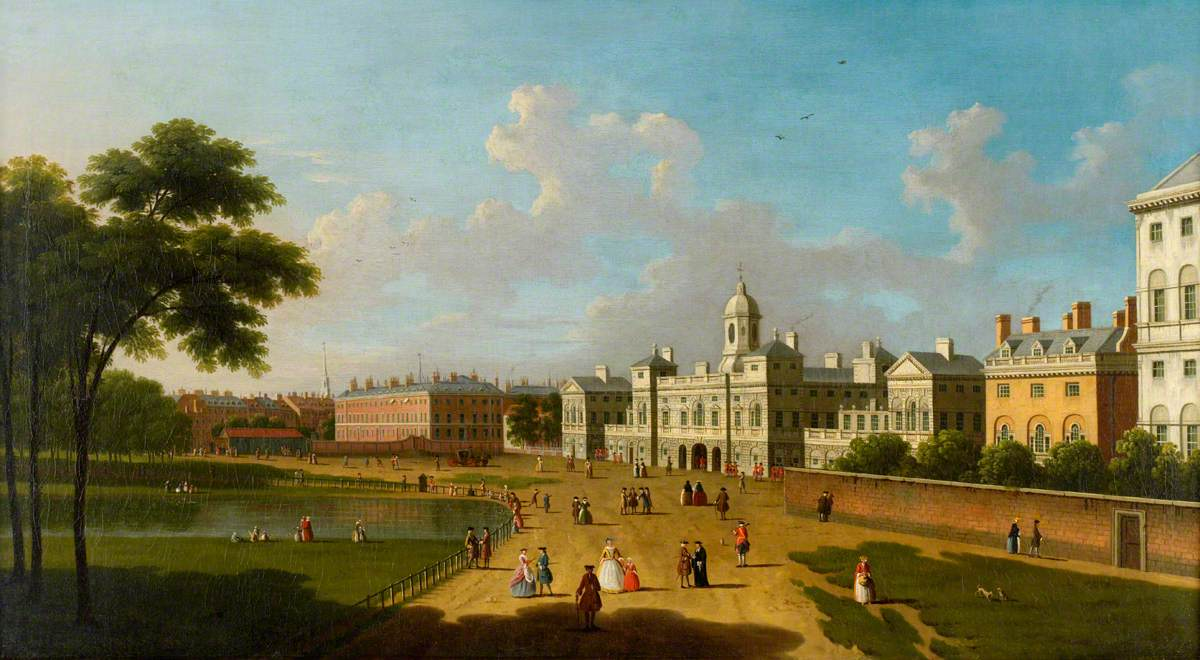
Horse Guards Parade, 1755

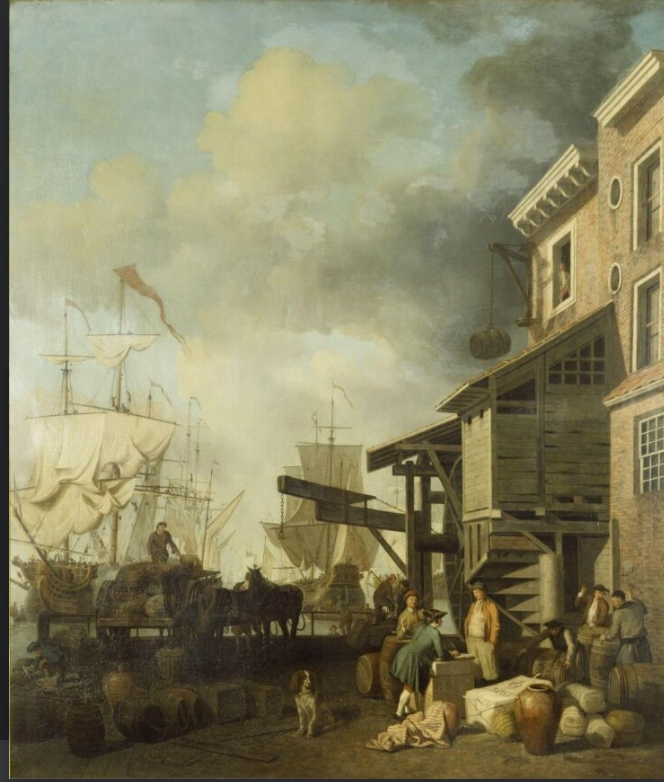
A Thames Wharf, 1757

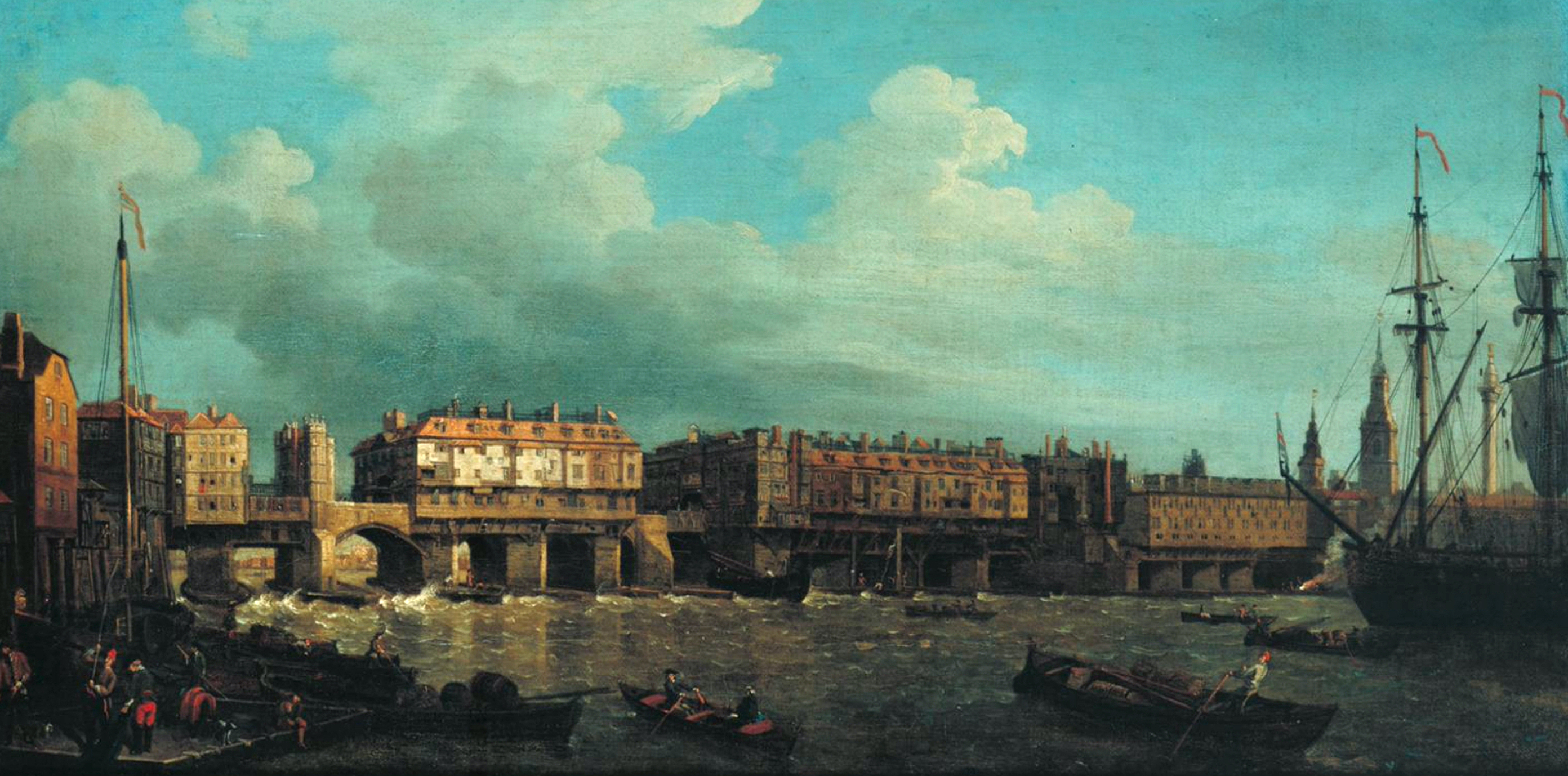
Old London Bridge, 1758

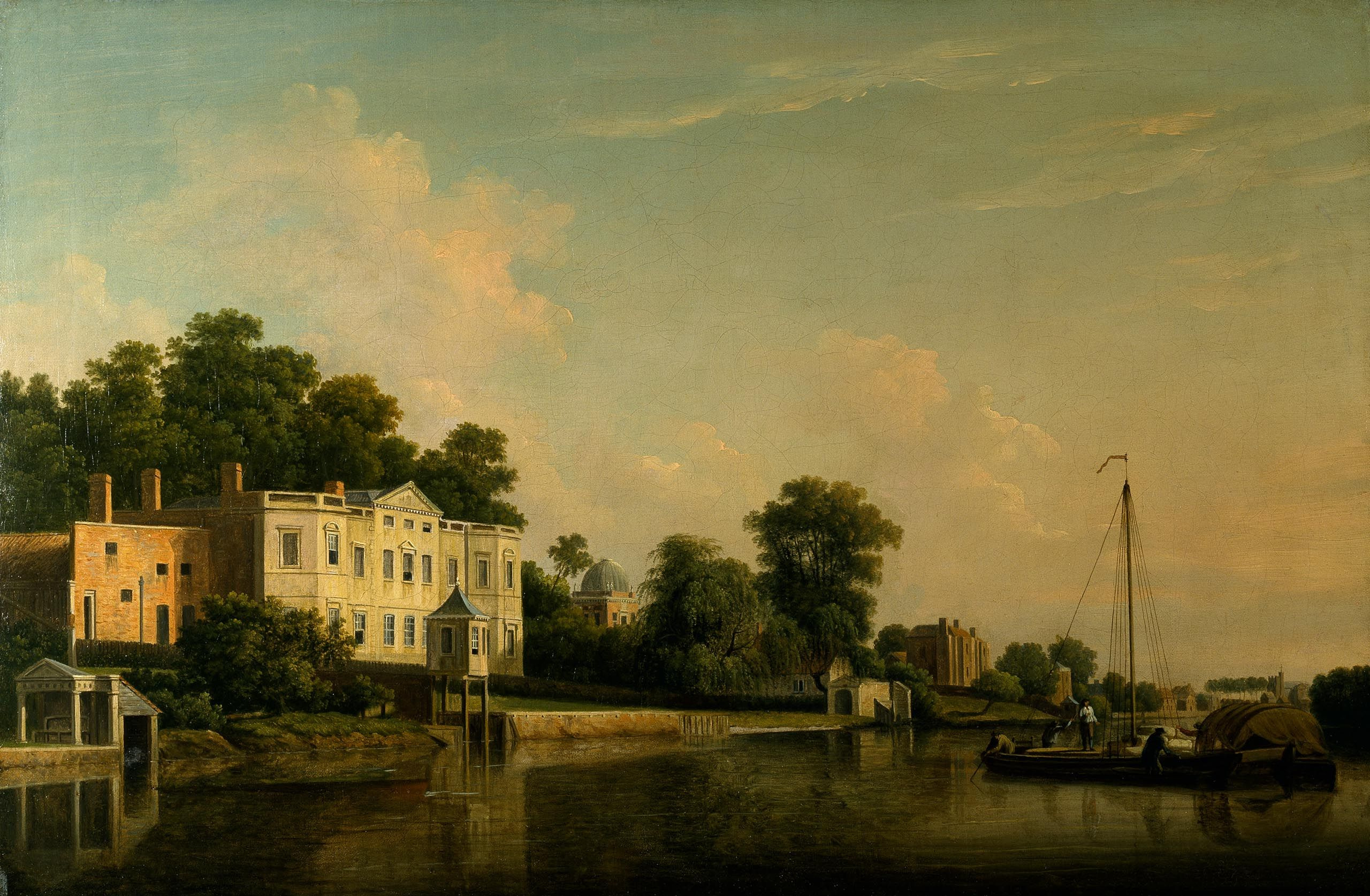
A View of Alexander Pope's Villa, Twickenham, 1759

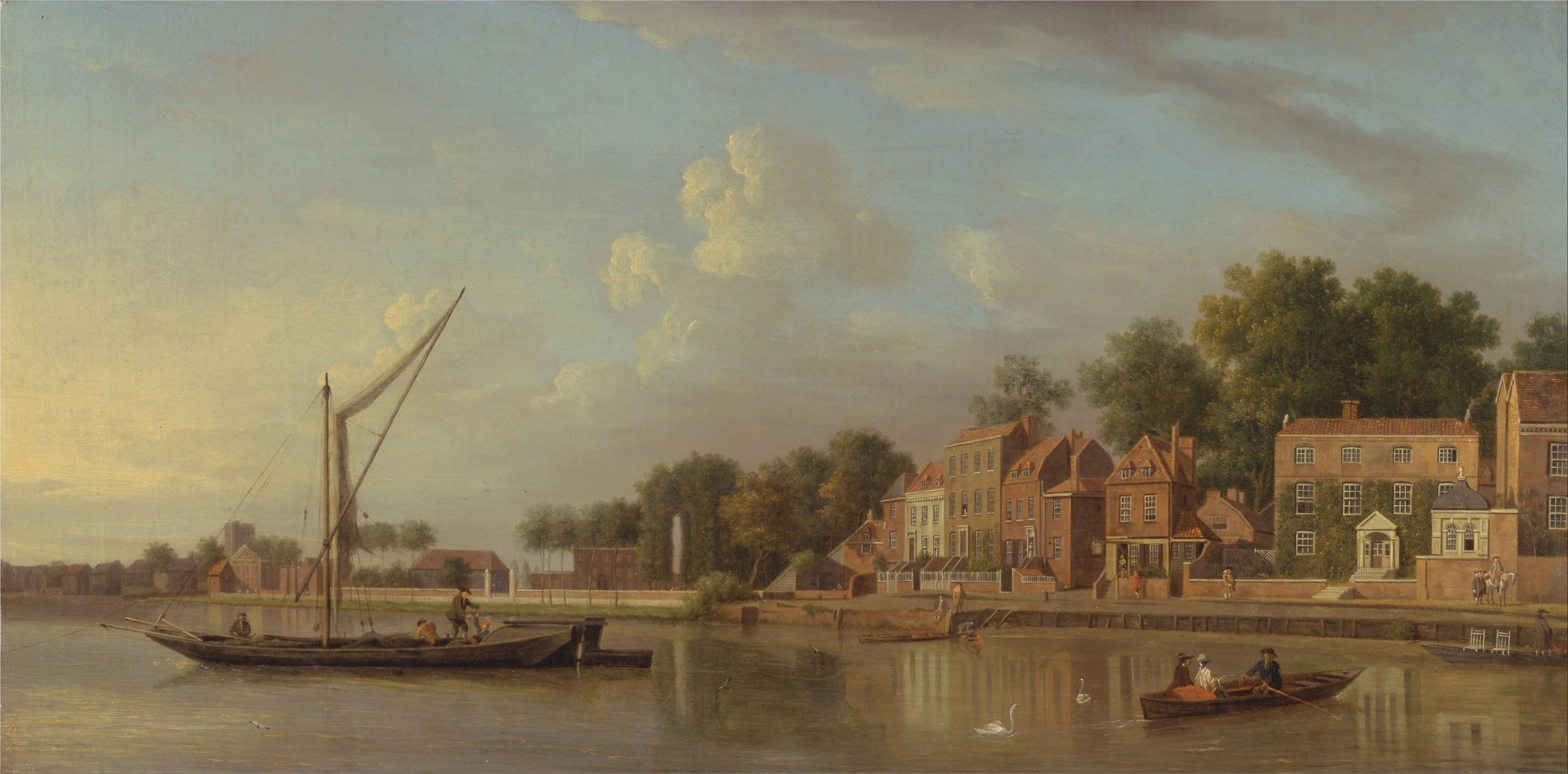
The Thames at Twickenham, c.1760

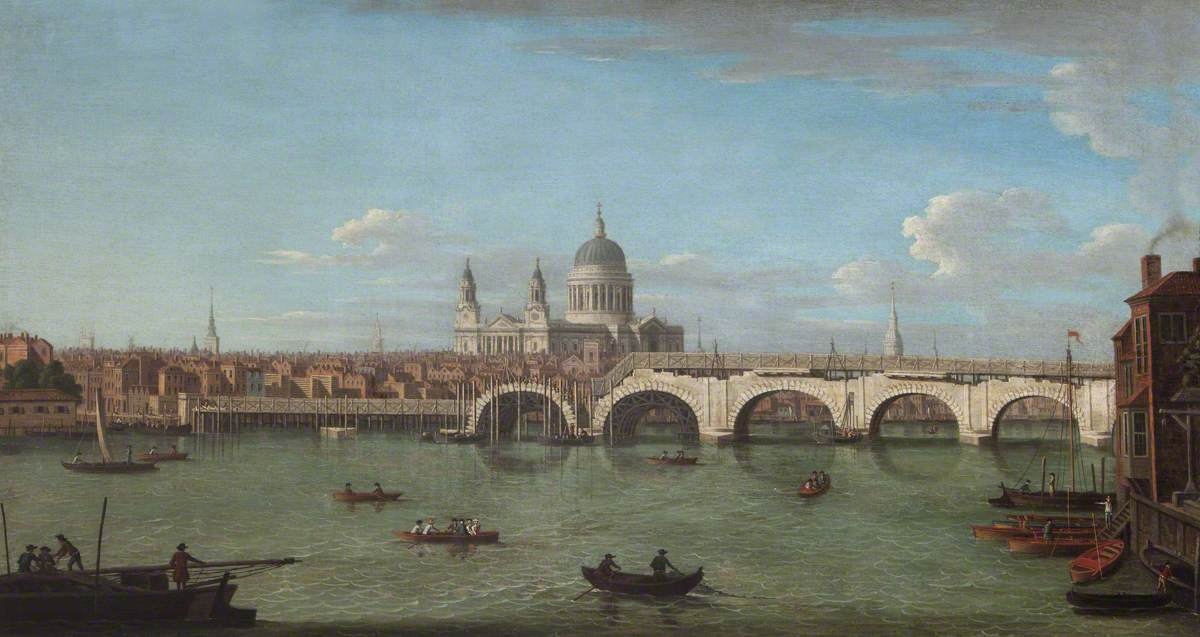
The Construction of Blackfriars Bridge, c.1763

French Firerafts Attacking the British Fleet off Quebec, 1767

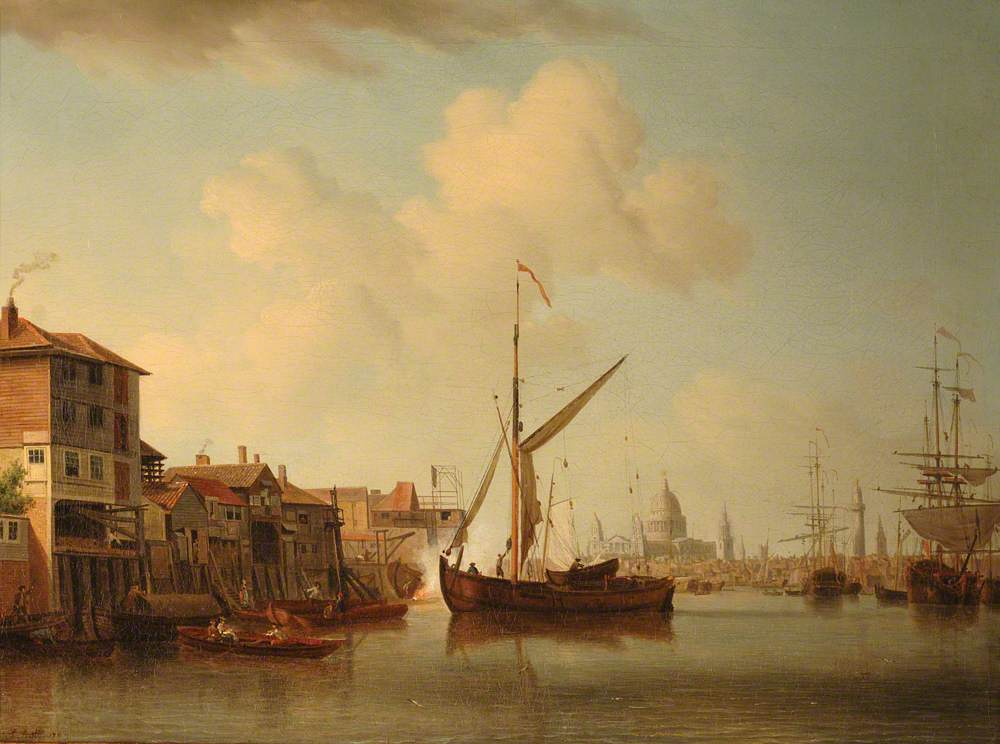
The Pool of London, 1769

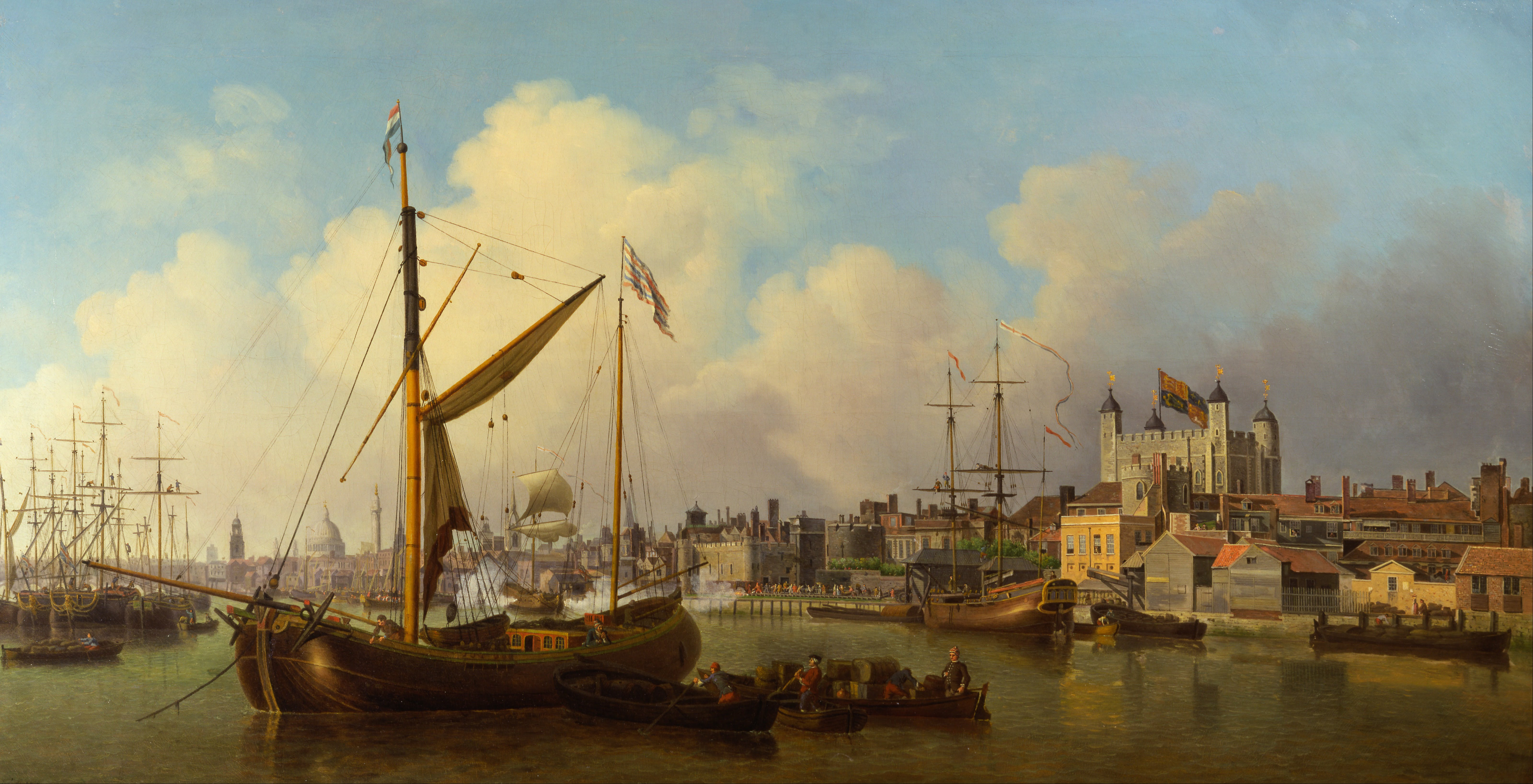
The Thames and the Tower of London, 1771

== References and sources ==
Sources

- Manners and Morals: Hogarth and British Painting1700–1760 (Exhibition catalogue). London: Tate Gallery. 1987.
