= George Nicol (bookseller) =

English bookseller and publisher

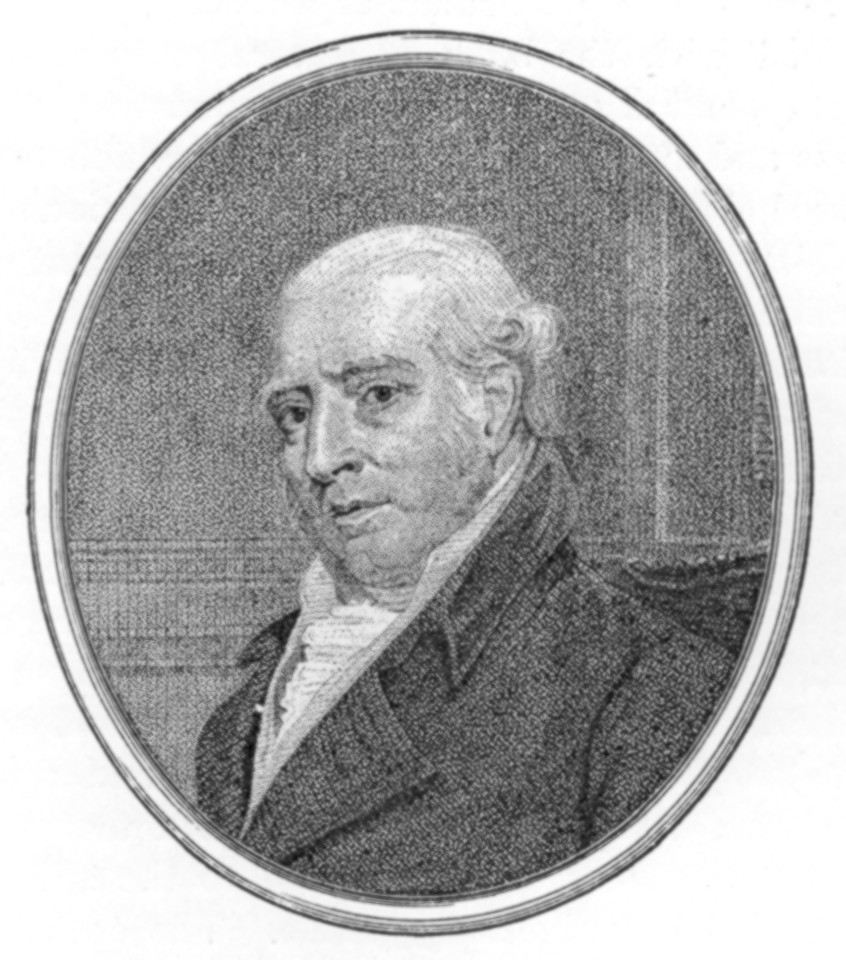
George Nicol, the king's bookseller, from William Roberts's The Book-Hunter in London (1895).

George Nicol (1740? – 25 June 1828) was a bookseller and publisher in 18th-century London. In 1781, he became bookseller to George III, a position he held until 1820. In 1785, he published an improved edition of James Cook's third voyage. In 1786, he became involved with John Boydell's Shakespeare Gallery and bore responsibility for the letterpress. He and the others in the project wanted to create a type that would be both utilitarian and beautiful.

== Early life and work ==
Nicol was born in Liberton, Midlothian, Scotland, in May 1741). Around 1769, he moved to London and began working for his uncle, David Wilson at his shop in the Strand. Later, the two men became partners. By spring 1773, Nicol had already become sufficiently successful to receive the king's informal commission to purchase books on his behalf. At the sale of the library of James West, president of the Royal Society, fellow booksellers such as John Almon were surprised when Nicol bought almost all available books printed by William Caxton. One remarked that "a Scotchman had lavished away the king's money in buying old black-letter books." In fact, Nicol had instructions from George III not to bid against any buyers who wanted "books of science and belles lettres for their own progressive or literary pursuits".

George Nicol

As Nicol's business prospered there were changes to his business partners and premises over time. Initially the business was styled Wilson and Nicol. Both names appeared on the catalogue issued in 1773 to sell the library of Henry Sacheverell. David Wilson died in 1777, and by 1781 Nicol was trading under his own name alone. His shop appears to have operated at 441 The Strand from 1778 to 1788. After Wilson's death, Nicol inherited his share in The Gazetteer and took a close interest in the operation of the newspaper, which published until 1797. In 1779, Nicol was appointed Bookseller to the Great Wardrobe, a royal title he held for three years until the abolition of the Great Wardrobe in 1782.

In 1787, Nicol moved his operations west to Pall Mall, purchasing 51 Pall Mall on 26 February 1787 and 58 Pall Mall the same year. He appears to have used No. 51 as his house, and No. 58 as his bookshop. (Later in 1787, John and Josiah Boydell took a lease on 52 Pall Mall for their Shakespeare Gallery.) In 1800, the business was renamed George and William Nicol, presumably to reflect the involvement of George's son. In about 1821, the business operations moved from 58 to 51 Pall Mall. After his father retired in 1825, William continued the business under both names until 1837, and under the name William Nicol alone from 1838 to 1855. From 1839 to 1855, William's business operated from premises at 60 Pall Mall.

Among Nicol's many publications were official accounts of government-funded expeditions. These included A Voyage to the Pacific Ocean (1784), James Cook's log of his explorations, published four years after Cook's death, and the official account in 1795 of George, Earl Macartney's ill-fated Embassy to China.

== Association with Boydell family ==
Nicol was married twice. His first marriage was to Elspeth Wilken, though little is known about her. The union produced six sons, including William. By the mid-1780s Nicol had developed a close friendship with the family of the engraver and publisher John Boydell. In November 1786, Nicol and John Boydell were among the dinner guests at the West Hampstead home of the engraver's nephew Josiah Boydell. This dinner was the genesis for the Boydells' Shakespeare Gallery project, in which Nicol became heavily involved. By Nicol's account (published many years later) the idea of an illustrated Shakespeare edition was at least partly his own, and something he had proposed unsuccessfully in his youth to David Garrick. Others, including the painter George Romney also later claimed to have proposed the idea.

The Bulmer typeface is a modern revival of William Martin's design, commissioned by George Nicol for the Boydell Shakespeare.

It is undisputed, however, that Nicol was an enthusiastic participant in the Shakespeare venture. It appears to have been Nicol who recruited William Martin, a typefounder from Birmingham, to cut the type for the new edition, and Martin worked at first from Nicol's home in Pall Mall. While Martin was working on the typeface, Nicol and Boydell met the printer William Bulmer by chance, resulting in the agreement to establish Bulmer and Nicol's Shakespeare Press at 3 Russell Court, off Cleveland Row at the western end of Pall Mall. With input from Nicol and Bulmer, Martin created a typeface that so successfully combined utility with beauty that experts took it to be the work of the continental master Giambattista Bodoni. Today, a revived version of this font is known as Bulmer.

The bibliographer Thomas Frognall Dibdin reports that despite Nicol and Bulmer's satisfaction with the typeface, they were irked by continuing unfavorable comparisons to Bodoni's output. To demonstrate the quality of their new typeface they concocted a "pretty cheat" that they called the "Bodoni Hum". Bulmer set and printed Cicero's De Officiis on four large octavo pages in a style mimicking Bodoni's output. Implying that the type was Bodoni's, Nicol showed the sample to various customers, who were so impressed by its beauty that they were anxious to buy copies. Nicol told them "that Mr. Bodoni had an agent in town; and if they would turn to the bottom of the last page of the specimen, they would find his address". The customers turned the page to find printed: "W. Bulmer and Co. Shakspeare Press." (Nicol denied Dibdin's initial assertion that the name "Bodoni Hum" derived from an exchange between Nicol and George III.) The new typeface helped build the reputation of Bulmer and Nicol's printing office, and the high quality of his output in turn helped build the reputation and popularity of British-produced books in the late-18th century. The association with William Bulmer was continued by Nicol's son William, who ran Bulmer's press from 1819 to 1835. George Nicol's partnership with Bulmer was formally dissolved on 31 December 1819.

As well as Nicol's substantial involvement with Boydell's developing Shakespeare Gallery, he also embarked on a romance with Mary Boydell, niece of John and sister of the painter Josiah Boydell. Mary had previously toured Europe with her uncle and written an illustrated memoir of the trip. She was described as a beauty at the time and was sought after by several suitors.

On 9 July 1787 as Nicol and Mary Boydell were walking up Prince's Street (now the southern section of Wardour Street) near Leicester Square, Mary Boydell was shot by Dr. John Elliot with a pair of pistols tied together. Although the shots had been close enough to burn half her cloak, Mary was only bruised by the attack. Elliot was a former suitor of Mary's who had become convinced that she had reneged on a promise to marry him, and that he had thereby lost a share in what he believed to be John Boydell's £30,000 fortune. Elliot was also the developer of the idea that different elements of the retina respond to different portions of the spectrum of light, a theory advanced in a posthumously published medical textbook.

At Elliot's subsequent Old Bailey trial, it was argued that he may have failed to load his pistols with shot, or have intentionally used unloaded weapons. Elliot's counsel unsuccessfully attempted also to argue a defense of insanity, based largely on the supposedly evident insanity of Elliot's theories of solar radiation. The jury nevertheless acquitted Elliott of attempted murder as they did not accept that the pistols had been loaded. Elliot remained charged with assault and was remanded to Newgate Gaol, where he refused food and water and died on 22 July 1787. George Nicol and Mary Boydell were married on 8 September 1787. Mary became a print collector and writer in her own right. She died on 21 December 1820 and her prints were bought by the Duke of Buckingham. Her 'valuable collection of prints and portraits, splendid books of prints, and illustrated works' were sold at auction by R. H. Evans on 1 July 1822 and seven following days; Evans sold her 'books and books of prints, natural history, &c.' on 9 July 1822. Copies of both catalogues are at Cambridge University Library (shelfmark Munby.c.125(2-3)). Nicol and his son accompanied Josiah and John North Boydell in the funeral procession for John Boydell on 19 December 1804.

== Librarian and auctioneer ==
George Nicol's signature from an 11 November 1812 letter to Thomas Frognall Dibdin in which he apologises for not sending an annotated catalogue to Dibdin, who had been a "good customer" at the Roxburghe sale.

In addition to publishing and selling books, Nicol also served as a librarian to several aristocrats. He was a friend of George III, John Ker, 3rd Duke of Roxburghe and Augustus FitzRoy, 3rd Duke of Grafton. In 1812, after the Duke of Roxburghe's death he worked with a fellow bookseller, Robert Harding Evans, on the sale of the duke's extensive library. Nicol wrote the catalogue and organised the auction. The sale went on for 42 days, garnered £23,341 (the books had been purchased for £5,000), and started a "bibliomania" and the Roxburghe Club. It was Evans's first experience as an auctioneer, and the huge success of the sale spurred him to become the leading book auctioneer in early 19th-century London. Nicol and Evans collaborated again in 1815, on the sale of the library of the Duke of Grafton.

== Later life ==
George Nicol retired in 1825 and Evans conducted a sale of Nicol's library the same year. Among the works sold was the copy of the Gutenberg Bible on vellum that is now in The Huntington Library. After a long illness, Nicol died at his home in Pall Mall on 25 June 1828. Both he and his wife are buried at St. Olave Old Jewry.

== Bibliography ==
- —. Narrative of the Life and Death of John Elliot, M.D. London, 1787.
- —. "John Elliot, M.D.". The Newgate Calendar, Vol. IV, 164–168. London: Navarre Society Ltd., 1926.
- Burke, Edmund. The Annual Register, or a View of the History, Politics, and Literature of the Year 1828. London: J. Dodsley, 1829.
- Dibdin, Rev. Thomas Frognall. The Bibliographical Decameron. 3 vols. (Vol I, Vol II, Vol III). London: W. Bulmer and Co. (Shakspeare Press), 1817.
- Dibdin, Rev. Thomas Frognall. Reminiscences of a Literary Life. 2 vols. (Vol I, Vol II). London: John Major, 1836.
- Elliot, John. Elements of Natural Philosophy. London, 1792.
- Maxted, Ian. "The London book trades 1775-1800: a preliminary checklist of members. Names N-O." Exeter Working Papers in British Book Trade History. Retrieved on 29 January 2008.
- Mollon, J.D. "The Origins of Modern Color Science". The Science of Color. London: Elsevier Ltd, 2003. ISBN 0-444-51251-9. Retrieved on 29 January 2008.
- Painting, Vivienne W. "George Nicol". Oxford Dictionary of National Biography. Oxford University Press. 2004. Retrieved on 29 January 2008.
- Roberts, William. The Book-Hunter in London. London: Elliot Stock, 1895.
- Wheatley, Henry B. Round About Piccadilly and Pall Mall. London: Smith, Elder & Co., 1870.
