= Boydell Shakespeare Gallery =

Former art gallery in London

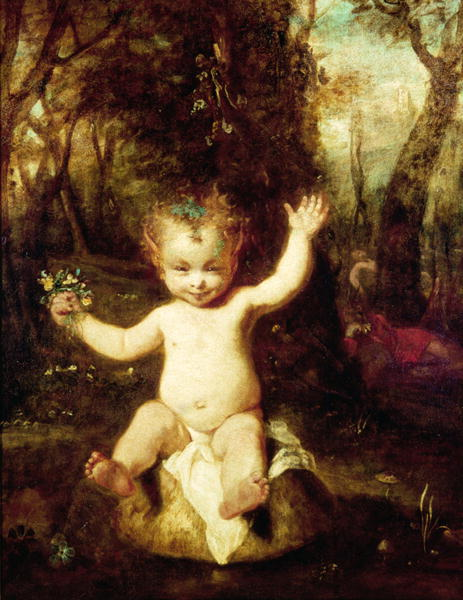
Joshua Reynolds' Puck (1789), painted for Boydell's Shakespeare Gallery, is modelled after Parmigianino's Madonna with St. Zachary, the Magdalen, and St. John

The Boydell Shakespeare Gallery in London, England, was the first stage of a three-part project initiated in November 1786 by engraver and publisher John Boydell in an effort to foster a school of British history painting. In addition to the establishment of the gallery, Boydell planned to produce an illustrated edition of William Shakespeare's plays and a folio of prints based upon a series of paintings by different contemporary painters. During the 1790s the London gallery that showed the original paintings emerged as the project's most popular element.

The works of William Shakespeare enjoyed a renewed popularity in 18th-century Britain. Several new editions of his works were published, his plays were revived in the theatre and numerous works of art were created illustrating the plays and specific productions of them. Capitalising on this interest, Boydell decided to publish a grand illustrated edition of Shakespeare's plays that would showcase the talents of British painters and engravers. He chose the noted scholar and Shakespeare editor George Steevens to oversee the edition, which was released between 1791 and 1803.

The press reported weekly on the building of Boydell's gallery, designed by George Dance the Younger, on a site in Pall Mall. Boydell commissioned works from famous painters of the day, such as Joshua Reynolds, and the folio of engravings proved the enterprise's most lasting legacy. However, the long delay in publishing the prints and the illustrated edition prompted criticism. Because they were hurried, and many illustrations had to be done by lesser artists, the final products of Boydell's venture were judged to be disappointing. The project caused the Boydell firm to become insolvent, and they were forced to sell the gallery and its contents at a lottery in 1805.

== Shakespeare in the 18th century ==
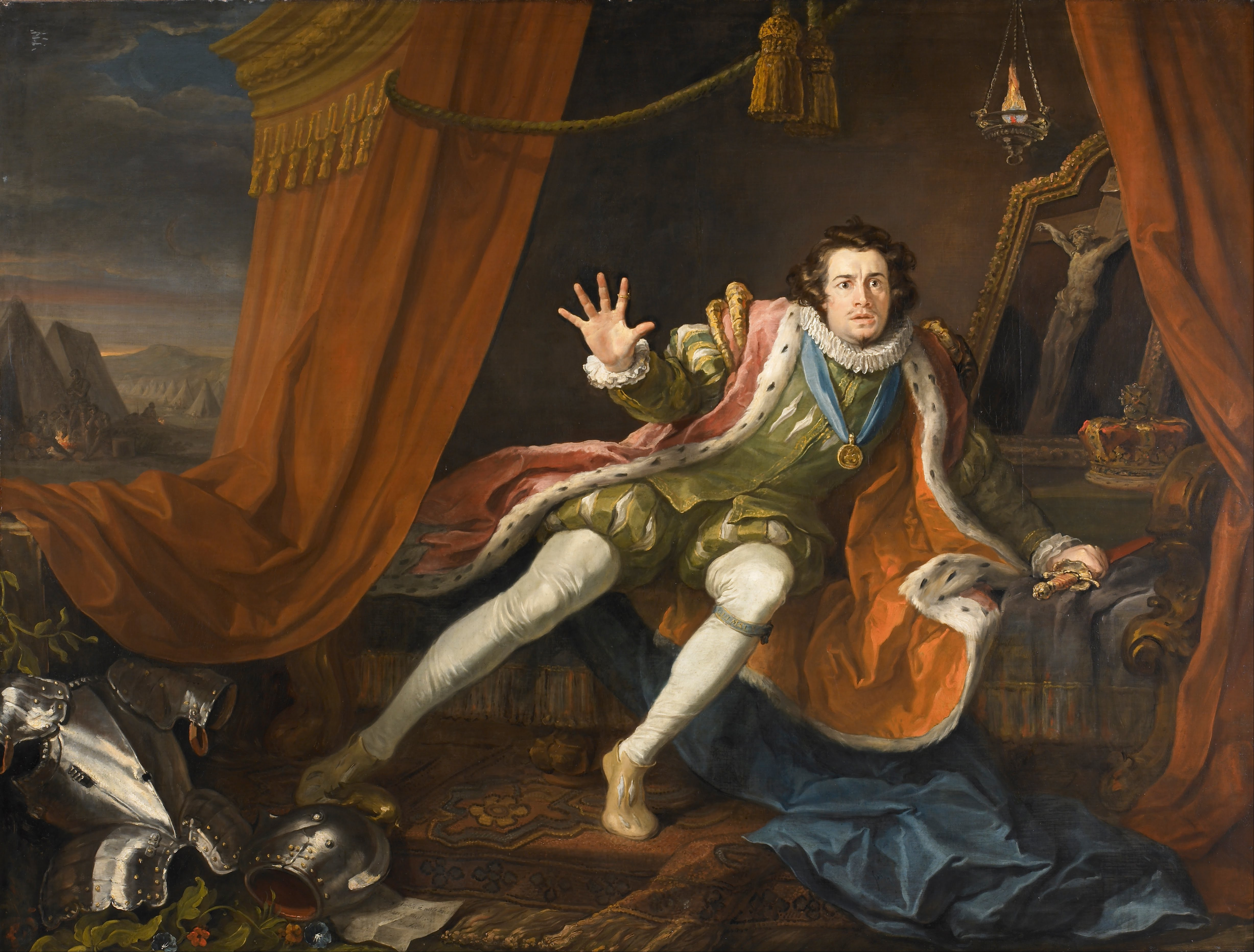
William Hogarth's portrait of David Garrick as Richard III (1745)

In the 18th century, Shakespeare became associated with rising British nationalism, and Boydell tapped into the same mood that many other entrepreneurs were exploiting. Shakespeare appealed not only to a social elite who prided themselves on their artistic taste, but also to the emerging middle class who saw in Shakespeare's works a vision of a diversified society. The mid-century Shakespearean theatrical revival was probably most responsible for reintroducing the British public to Shakespeare. Shakespeare's plays were integral to the theatre's resurgence at this time. Despite the upsurge in theatre-going, writing tragedies was not profitable, and thus few good tragedies were written. Shakespeare's works filled the gap in the repertoire, and his reputation grew as a result. By the end of the 18th century, one out of every six plays performed in London was by Shakespeare.

The actor, director, and producer David Garrick was a key figure in Shakespeare's theatrical renaissance. His reportedly superb acting, unrivalled productions, numerous and important Shakespearean portraits, and his spectacular 1769 Shakespeare Jubilee helped promote Shakespeare as a marketable product and the national playwright. Garrick's Drury Lane theatre was the centre of the Shakespeare mania which swept the nation.

The visual arts also played a significant role in expanding Shakespeare's popular appeal. In particular, the conversation pieces designed chiefly for homes generated a wide audience for literary art, especially Shakespearean art. This tradition began with William Hogarth (whose prints reached all levels of society) and attained its peak in the Royal Academy exhibitions, which displayed paintings, drawings, and sculptures. The exhibitions became important public events: thousands flocked to see them, and newspapers reported in detail on the works displayed. They became a fashionable place to be seen (as did Boydell's Shakespeare Gallery, later in the century). In the process, the public was refamiliarized with Shakespeare's works.

=== Shakespeare editions ===
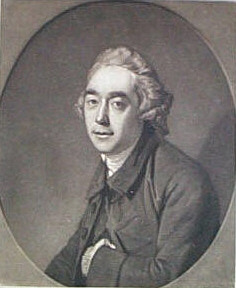
George Steevens, one of the greatest Shakespeare scholars of the 18th century and the editor of the Boydell Shakespeare edition

The rise in Shakespeare's popularity coincided with Britain's accelerating change from an oral to a print culture. Towards the end of the century, the basis of Shakespeare's high reputation changed. He had originally been respected as a playwright, but once the theatre became associated with the masses, Shakespeare's status as a "great writer" shifted. Two strands of Shakespearean print culture emerged: bourgeois popular editions and scholarly critical editions.

In order to turn a profit, booksellers chose well-known authors, such as Alexander Pope and Samuel Johnson, to edit Shakespeare editions. According to Shakespeare scholar Gary Taylor, Shakespearean criticism became so "associated with the dramatis personae of 18th-century English literature ... [that] he could not be extracted without uprooting a century and a half of the national canon". The 18th century's first Shakespeare edition, which was also the first illustrated edition of the plays, was published in 1709 by Jacob Tonson and edited by Nicholas Rowe. The plays appeared in "pleasant and readable books in small format" which "were supposed ... to have been taken for common or garden use, domestic rather than library sets". Shakespeare became "domesticated" in the 18th century, particularly with the publication of family editions such as Bell's in 1773 and 1785–86, which advertised themselves as "more instructive and intelligible; especially to the young ladies and to youth; glaring indecencies being removed".

Scholarly editions also proliferated. At first, these were edited by author-scholars such as Pope (1725) and Johnson (1765), but later in the century this changed. Editors such as George Steevens (1773, 1785) and Edmond Malone (1790) produced meticulous editions with extensive footnotes. The early editions appealed to both the middle class and to those interested in Shakespeare scholarship, but the later editions appealed almost exclusively to the latter. Boydell's edition, at the end of the century, tried to reunite these two strands. It included illustrations but was edited by George Steevens, one of the foremost Shakespeare scholars of the day.

== Boydell's Shakespeare venture ==
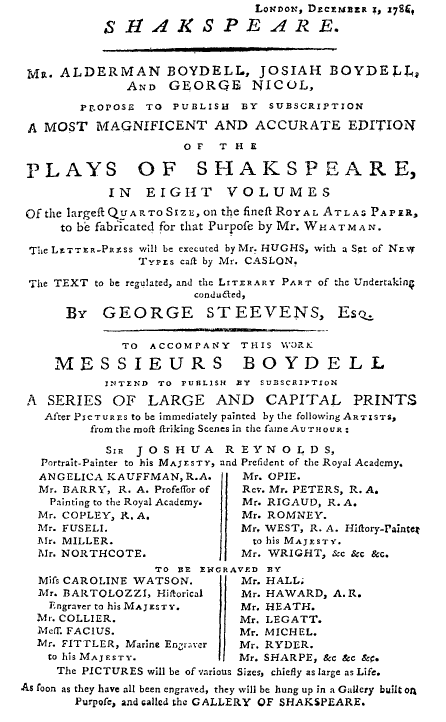
The prospectus for the Boydell venture states that "the foregoing work is undertaken in Honour of SHAKSPEARE,—with a view to encourage and improve the Arts of Painting and Engraving in this Kingdom".

Boydell's Shakespeare project contained three parts: an illustrated edition of Shakespeare's plays; a folio of prints from the gallery (originally intended to be a folio of prints from the edition of Shakespeare's plays); and a public gallery where the original paintings for the prints would hang.

The idea of a grand Shakespeare edition was conceived during a dinner at the home of Josiah Boydell (John's nephew) in late 1786. Five important accounts of the occasion survive. From these, a guest list and a reconstruction of the conversation have been assembled. The guest list reflects the range of Boydell's contacts in the artistic world: it included Benjamin West, painter to King George III; George Romney, a renowned portrait painter; George Nicol, bookseller to the king; William Hayley, a poet; John Hoole, a scholar and translator of Tasso and Aristotle; and Daniel Braithwaite, secretary to the postmaster general and a patron of artists such as Romney and Angelica Kauffman. Most accounts also place the painter Paul Sandby at the gathering.

Boydell wanted to use the edition to help stimulate a British school of history painting. He wrote in the "Preface" to the folio that he wanted "to advance that art towards maturity, and establish an English School of Historical Painting". A court document used by Josiah to collect debts from customers after Boydell's death relates the story of the dinner and Boydell's motivations:

[Boydell said] he should like to wipe away the stigma that all foreign critics threw on this nation—that they had no genius for historical painting. He said he was certain from his success in encouraging engraving that Englishmen wanted nothing but proper encouragement and a proper subject to excel in historical painting. The encouragement he would endeavor to find if a proper subject were pointed out. Mr. Nicol replied that there was one great National subject concerning which there could be no second opinion, and mentioned Shakespeare. The proposition was received with acclaim by the Alderman [John Boydell] and the whole company.

However, as Frederick Burwick argues in his introduction to a collection of essays on the Boydell Gallery, "[w]hatever claims Boydell might make about furthering the cause of history painting in England, the actual rallying force that brought the artists together to create the Shakespeare Gallery was the promise of engraved publication and distribution of their works."

After the initial success of the Shakespeare Gallery, many wanted to take credit. Henry Fuseli long claimed that his planned Shakespeare ceiling (in imitation of the Sistine Chapel ceiling) had given Boydell the idea for the gallery. James Northcote claimed that his Death of Wat Tyler and Murder of the Princes in the Tower had motivated Boydell to start the project. However, according to Winifred Friedman, who has researched the Boydell Gallery, it was probably Joshua Reynolds's Royal Academy lectures on the superiority of history painting that influenced Boydell the most.

The logistics of the enterprise were difficult to organise. Boydell and Nicol wanted to produce an illustrated edition of a multi-volume work and intended to bind and sell the 72 large prints separately in a folio. A gallery was required to exhibit the paintings from which the prints were drawn. The edition was to be financed through a subscription campaign, during which the buyers would pay part of the price up front and the remainder on delivery. This unusual practice was necessitated by the fact that over £350,000—an enormous sum at the time, worth about £46.2 million today—was eventually spent. The gallery opened in 1789 with 34 paintings and added 33 more in 1790 when the first engravings were published. The last volume of the edition and the Collection of Prints were published in 1803. In the middle of the project, Boydell decided that he could make more money if he published different prints in the folio than in the illustrated edition; as a result, the two sets of images are not identical.

Advertisements were issued and placed in newspapers. When a subscription was circulated for a medal to be struck, the copy read: "The encouragers of this great national undertaking will also have the satisfaction to know, that their names will be handed down to Posterity, as the Patrons of Native Genius, enrolled with their own hands, in the same book, with the best of Sovereigns." The language of both the advertisement and the medal emphasised the role each subscriber played in the patronage of the arts. The subscribers were primarily middle-class Londoners, not aristocrats. Edmond Malone, himself an editor of a rival Shakespeare edition, wrote that "before the scheme was well-formed, or the proposals entirely printed off, near six hundred persons eagerly set down their names, and paid their subscriptions to a set of books and prints that will cost each person, I think, about ninety guineas; and on looking over the list, there were not above twenty names among them that anybody knew".

== Illustrated Shakespeare edition and folio ==
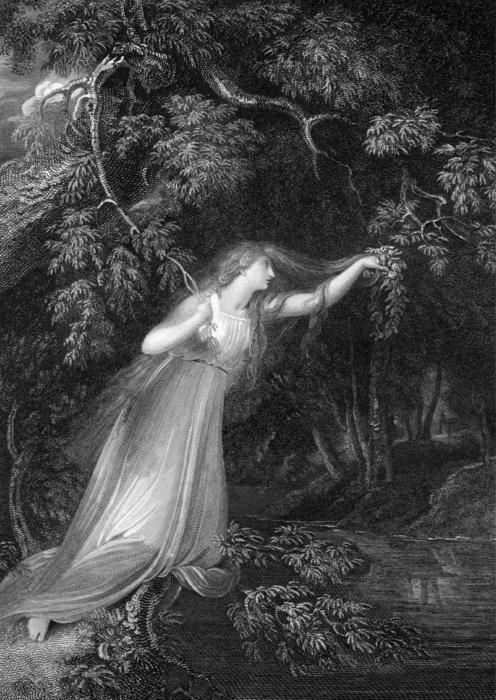
Richard Westall's Ophelia, engraved by J. Parker for Boydell's illustrated edition of Shakespeare's Dramatic Works

The "magnificent and accurate" Shakespeare edition which Boydell began in 1786 was to be the focus of his enterprise—he viewed the print folio and the gallery as offshoots of the main project. In an advertisement prefacing the first volume of the edition, Nicol wrote that "splendor and magnificence, united with correctness of text were the great objects of this Edition". The volumes themselves were handsome, with gilded pages that, unlike those in previous scholarly editions, were unencumbered by footnotes. Each play had its own title page followed by a list of "Persons in the Drama". Boydell spared no expense. He hired the typography experts William Bulmer and William Martin to develop and cut a new typeface specifically for the edition. Nicol explains in the preface that they "established a printing-house ... [and] a foundry to cast the types; and even a manufactory to make the ink". Boydell also chose to use high-quality wove Whatman paper. The illustrations were printed independently and could be inserted and removed as the purchaser desired. The first volumes of the Dramatic Works were published in 1791 and the last in 1805.

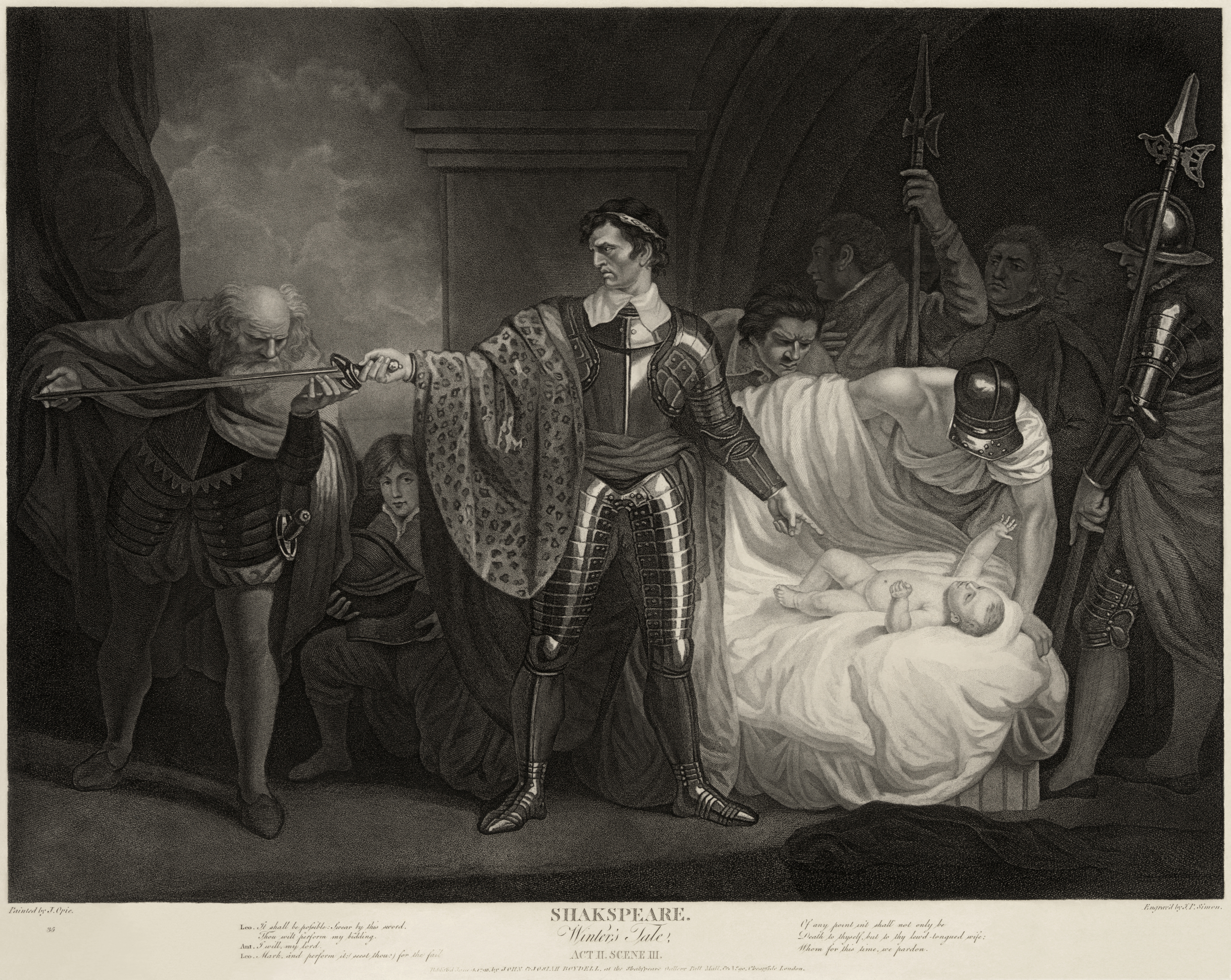
The Winter's Tale, Act II, scene 3, engraved by Jean Pierre Simon from a painting by John Opie commissioned and prepared for engraving by the Shakespeare Gallery.

Boydell was responsible for the "splendor", and George Steevens, the general editor, was responsible for the "correctness of text". Steevens, according to Evelyn Wenner, who has studied the history of the Boydell edition, was "at first an ardent advocate of the plan" but "soon realized that the editor of this text must in the very scheme of things give way to painters, publishers and engravers". He was also ultimately disappointed in the quality of the prints, but he said nothing to jeopardize the edition's sales. Steevens, who had already edited two complete Shakespeare editions, was not asked to edit the text anew; instead, he picked which version of the text to reprint. Wenner describes the resulting hybrid edition:

The thirty-six plays, printed from the texts of Reed and Malone, divide into the following three groups: (1) five plays of the first three numbers printed from Reed's edition of 1785 with many changes adopted from the Malone text of 1790 (2) King Lear and the six plays of the next three numbers printed from Malone's edition of 1790 but exhibiting conspicuous deviations from his basic text (3) twenty-four plays of the last twelve numbers also printed from Malone's text but made to conform to Steevens's own edition of 1793.

Throughout the edition, modern (i.e. 18th-century) spelling was preferred as were First Folio readings.

Boydell sought out the most eminent painters and engravers of the day to contribute paintings for the gallery, engravings for the folio, and illustrations for the edition. Artists included Richard Westall, Thomas Stothard, George Romney, Henry Fuseli, Benjamin West, Angelica Kauffman, Robert Smirke, James Durno, John Opie, Francesco Bartolozzi, Thomas Kirk, Henry Thomson, and Boydell's nephew and business partner, Josiah Boydell.

The folio and the illustrated Shakespeare edition were "by far the largest single engraving enterprise ever undertaken in England". As print collector and dealer Christopher Lennox-Boyd explains, "had there not been a market for such engravings, not one of the paintings would have been commissioned, and few, if any, of the artists would have risked painting such elaborate compositions". Scholars believe that a variety of engraving methods were employed and that line engraving was the "preferred medium" because it was "clear and hardwearing" and because it had a high reputation. Stipple engraving, which was quicker and often used to produce shading effects, wore out quicker and was valued less. Many plates were a mixture of both. Several scholars have suggested that mezzotint and aquatint were also used. Lennox-Boyd, however, claims that "close examination of the plates confirms" that these two methods were not used and argues that they were "totally unsuitable": mezzotint wore quickly and aquatint was too new (there would not have been enough artists capable of executing it). Most of Boydell's engravers were also trained artists; for example, Bartolozzi was renowned for his stippling technique.

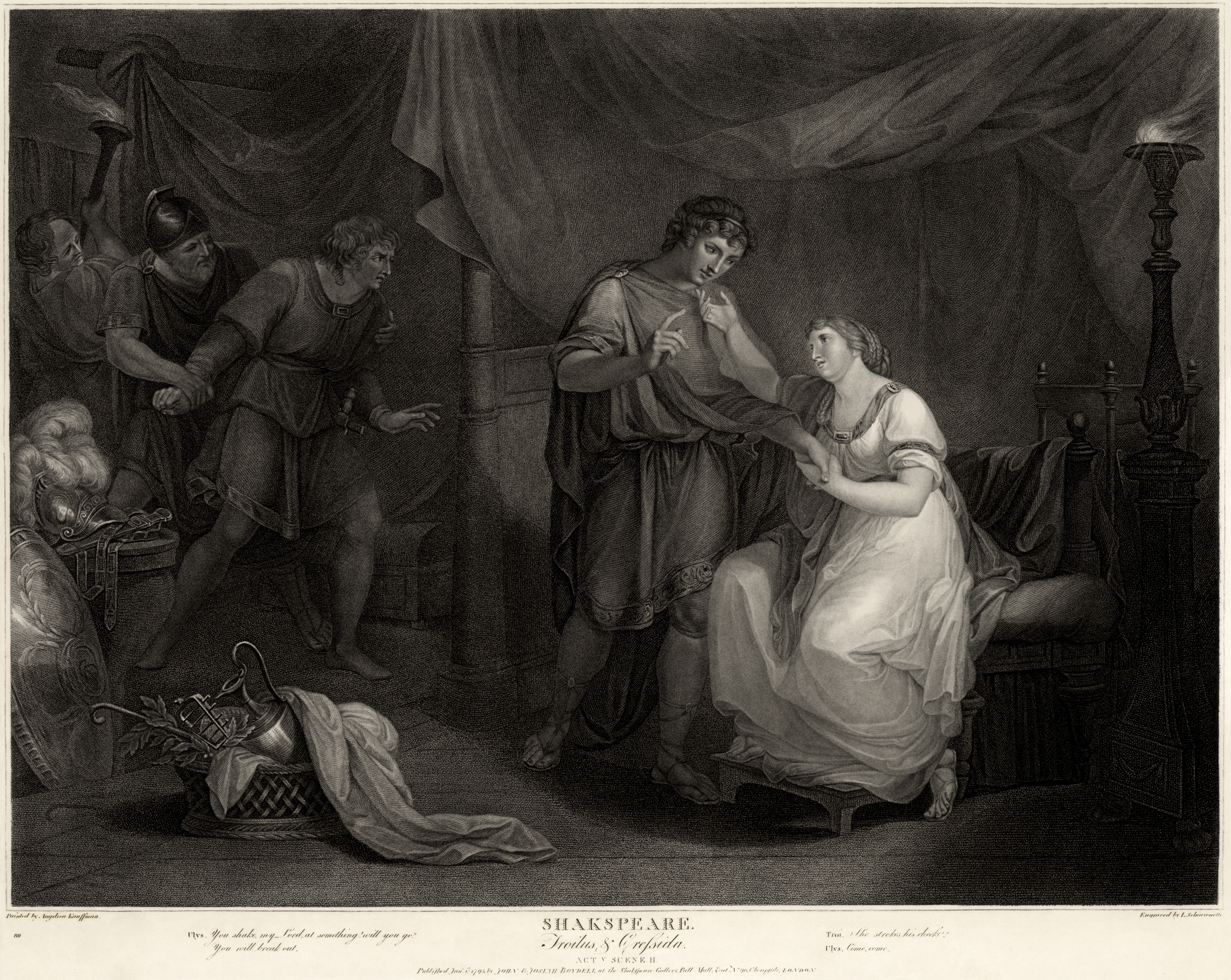
Angelica Kauffman described her scene from Troilus and Cressida, engraved by Luigi Schiavonetti for the folio: Troilus "sees his wife in loving discourse with Diomedes and he wants to rush into the tent to catch them by surprise, but Ulysses and the other keep him back by force".

Boydell's relationships with his illustrators were generally congenial. One of them, James Northcote, praised Boydell's liberal payments. He wrote in an 1821 letter that Boydell "did more for the advancement of the arts in England than the whole mass of the nobility put together! He paid me more nobly than any other person has done; and his memory I shall ever hold in reverence". Boydell typically paid the painters between £105 and £210, and the engravers between £262 and £315. Joshua Reynolds at first declined Boydell's offer to work on the project, but he agreed when pressed. Boydell offered Reynolds carte blanche for his paintings, giving him a down payment of £500, an extraordinary amount for an artist who had not even agreed to do a specific work. Boydell eventually paid him a total of £1,500.

There are 96 illustrations in the nine volumes of the illustrated edition and each play has at least one. Approximately two-thirds of the plays, 23 out of 36, are each illustrated by a single artist. Approximately two-thirds of the total number of illustrations, or 65, were completed by three artists: William Hamilton, Richard Westall, and Robert Smirke. The primary illustrators of the edition were known as book illustrators, whereas a majority of the artists included in the folio were known for their paintings. Lennox-Boyd argues that the illustrations in the edition have a "uniformity and cohesiveness" that the folio lacks because the artists and engravers working on them understood book illustration while those working on the folio were working in an unfamiliar medium.

The print folio, A Collection of Prints, From Pictures Painted for the Purpose of Illustrating the Dramatic Works of Shakspeare, by the Artists of Great-Britain (1805), was originally intended to be a collection of the illustrations from the edition, but a few years into the project, Boydell altered his plan. He guessed that he could sell more folios and editions if the pictures were different. Of the 97 prints made from paintings, two-thirds of them were made by ten of the artists. Three artists account for one-third of the paintings. In all, 31 artists contributed works.

== Gallery building ==
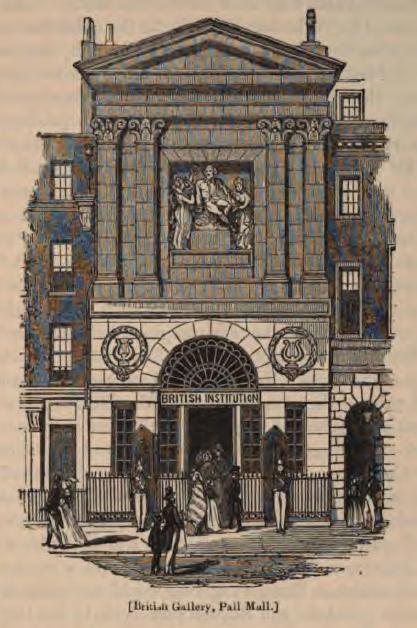
George Dance's Shakespeare Gallery building, shown in 1851 after its purchase by the British Institution, wood-engraving by Mason Jackson after from a drawing by Henry Anelay.

In June 1788, Boydell and his nephew secured the lease on a site at 52 Pall Mall (51°30′20.5″N 0°8′12″W) to build the gallery and engaged George Dance, then the Clerk of the City Works, as the architect for the project. Pall Mall at that time had a mix of expensive residences and commercial operations, such as bookshops and gentleman's clubs, popular with fashionable London society. The area also contained some less genteel establishments: King's Place (now Pall Mall Place), an alley running to the east and behind Boydell's gallery, was the site of Charlotte Hayes's high-class brothel. Across King's Place, immediately to the east of Boydell's building, 51 Pall Mall had been purchased on 26 February 1787 by George Nicol, bookseller and future husband of Josiah's elder sister, Mary Boydell. As an indication of the changing character of the area, this property had been the home of Goostree's gentleman's club from 1773 to 1787. Begun as a gambling establishment for wealthy young men, it had later become a reformist political club that counted William Pitt and William Wilberforce as members.

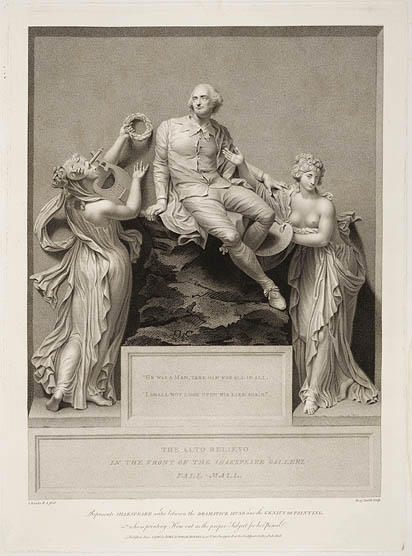
Engraving by Benjamin Smith after Thomas Banks's sculpture of Shakespeare attended by Painting and Poetry

Dance's Shakespeare Gallery building had a monumental, neoclassical stone front, and a full-length exhibition hall on the ground floor. Three interconnecting exhibition rooms occupied the upper floor, with a total of more than 4,000 square feet (370 m^{2}) of wall space for displaying pictures. The two-storey façade was not especially large for the street, but its solid classicism had an imposing effect. Some reports describe the exterior as "sheathed in copper".

The lower storey of the façade was dominated by a large, rounded-arched doorway in the centre. The unmoulded arch rested on wide piers, each broken by a narrow window, above which ran a simple cornice. Dance placed a transom across the doorway at the level of the cornice bearing the inscription "Shakespeare Gallery". Below the transom were the main entry doors, with glazed panels and side lights matching the flanking windows. A radial fanlight filled the lunette above the transom. In each of the spandrels to the left and right of the arch, Dance set a carving of a lyre inside a ribboned wreath. Above all this ran a panelled band course dividing the lower storey from the upper.

The upper façade contained paired pilasters on either side, and a thick entablature and triangular pediment. The architect Sir John Soane criticised Dance's combination of slender pilasters and a heavy entablature as a "strange and extravagant absurdity". The capitals topping the pilasters sported volutes in the shape of ammonite fossils. Dance invented this neo-classical feature, which became known as the Ammonite Order, specifically for the gallery. In a recess between the pilasters, Dance placed Thomas Banks's sculpture Shakespeare attended by Painting and Poetry, for which the artist was paid 500 guineas. The sculpture depicted Shakespeare, reclining against a rock, between the Dramatic Muse and the Genius of Painting. Beneath it was a panelled pedestal inscribed with a quotation from Hamlet: "He was a Man, take him for all in all, I shall not look upon his like again".

== Reaction ==
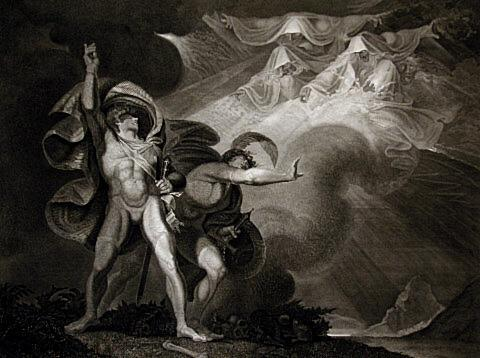
Fuseli "reveled in the monumental and grotesque" in his scenes from Macbeth, engraving by James Caldwell

The Shakespeare Gallery, when it opened on 4 May 1789, contained 34 paintings, and by the end of its run it had between 167 and 170. (The exact inventory is uncertain and most of the paintings have disappeared; only around 40 paintings can be identified with any certainty.) According to Frederick Burwick, during its sixteen-year operation, the Gallery reflected the transition from Neoclassicism to Romanticism. Works by artists such as James Northcote represent the conservative, neoclassical elements of the gallery, while those of Henry Fuseli represent the newly emerging Romantic movement. William Hazlitt praised Northcote in an essay entitled "On the Old Age of Artists", writing "I conceive any person would be more struck with Mr. Fuseli at first sight, but would wish to visit Mr. Northcote oftener."

The gallery itself was a fashionable hit with the public. Newspapers carried updates of the construction of the gallery, down to drawings for the proposed façade. The Daily Advertiser featured a weekly column on the gallery from May through August (exhibition season). Artists who had influence with the press, and Boydell himself, published anonymous articles to heighten interest in the gallery, which they hoped would increase sales of the edition.

At the beginning of the enterprise, reactions were generally positive. The Public Advertiser wrote on 6 May 1789: "the pictures in general give a mirror of the poet ... [The Shakespeare Gallery] bids fair to form such an epoch in the History of the Fine Arts, as will establish and confirm the superiority of the English School". The Times wrote a day later:

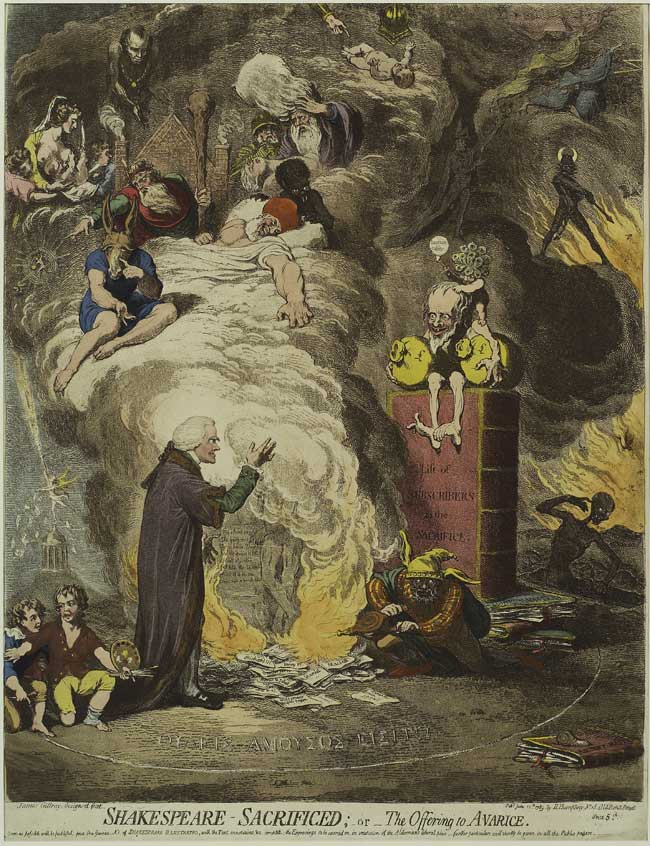
James Gillray's cartoon satirising the Boydell venture; caption reads: "Shakespeare Sacrificed; or, The Offering to Avarice"

This establishment may be considered with great truth, as the first stone of an English School of Painting; and it is peculiarly honourable to a great commercial country, that it is indebted for such a distinguished circumstance to a commercial character—such an institution—will place, in the Calendar of Arts, the name of Boydell in the same rank with the Medici of Italy.

Fuseli himself may have written the review in the Analytical Review, which praised the general plan of the gallery while at the same time hesitating: "such a variety of subjects, it may be supposed, must exhibit a variety of powers; all cannot be the first; while some must soar, others must skim the meadow, and others content themselves to walk with dignity". However, according to Frederick Burwick, critics in Germany "responded to the Shakespeare Gallery with far more thorough and meticulous attention than did the critics in England".

Criticism increased as the project dragged on: the first volume did not appear until 1791. James Gillray published a cartoon labelled "Boydell sacrificing the Works of Shakespeare to the Devil of Money-Bags". The essayist and soon-to-be co-author of the children's book Tales from Shakespeare (1807) Charles Lamb criticised the venture from the outset:

What injury did not Boydell's Shakespeare Gallery do me with Shakespeare. To have Opie's Shakespeare, Northcote's Shakespeare, light headed Fuseli's Shakespeare, wooden-headed West's Shakespeare, deaf-headed Reynolds' Shakespeare, instead of my and everybody's Shakespeare. To be tied down to an authentic face of Juliet! To have Imogen's portrait! To confine the illimitable!

Northcote, while appreciating Boydell's largesse, also criticised the results of the project: "With the exception of a few pictures by Joshua [Reynolds] and [John] Opie, and—I hope I may add—myself, it was such a collection of slip-slop imbecility as was dreadful to look at, and turned out, as I had expected it would, in the ruin of poor Boydell's affairs".

== Collapse ==
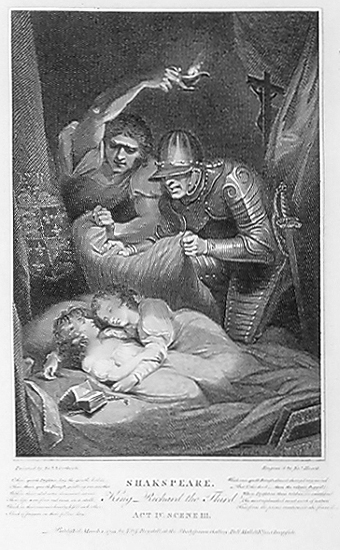
Richard III: Act IV, Scene 3: Murder of the princes (1791), engraved by James Heath after a painting by James Northcote

By 1796, subscriptions to the edition had dropped by two-thirds. The painter and diarist Joseph Farington recorded that this was a result of the poor engravings:

West said He looked over the Shakespeare prints and was sorry to see them of such inferior quality. He said that excepting that from His Lear by Sharpe, that from Northcote's children in the Tower, and some small ones, there were few that could be approved. Such a mixture of dotting and engraving, and such a general deficiency in respect of drawing which He observed the Engravers seemed to know little of, that the volumes presented a mass of works which He did not wonder many subscribers had declined to continue their subscription.

The mix of engraving styles was criticised; line engraving was considered the superior form and artists and subscribers disliked the mixture of lesser forms with it. Moreover, Boydell's engravers fell behind schedule, delaying the entire project. He was forced to engage lesser artists, such as Hamilton and Smirke, at a lower price to finish the volumes as his business started to fail. Modern art historians have generally concurred that the quality of the engravings, particularly in the folio, was poor. Moreover, the use of so many different artists and engravers led to a lack of stylistic cohesion.

Although the Boydells ended with 1,384 subscriptions, the rate of subscriptions dropped, and remaining subscriptions were also increasingly in doubt. Like many businesses at the time, the Boydell firm kept few records. Only the customers knew what they had purchased. This caused numerous difficulties with debtors who claimed they had never subscribed or had subscribed for less. Many subscribers also defaulted, and Josiah Boydell spent years after John's death attempting to force them to pay.

The Boydells focused all their attention on the Shakespeare edition and other large projects, such as The History of the River Thames and The Complete Works of John Milton, rather than on lesser, more profitable ventures. When both the Shakespeare enterprise and the Thames book failed, the firm had no capital to fall back upon. Beginning in 1789, with the onset of the French Revolution, John Boydell's export business to Europe was cut off. By the late 1790s and early 19th century, the two-thirds of his business that depended upon the export trade was in serious financial difficulty.

In 1804, John Boydell decided to appeal to Parliament for a private bill to authorise a lottery to dispose of everything in his business. Boydell's Lottery Act 1804 (44 Geo. 3. c. vi) received royal assent on 23 March, and by November the Boydells were ready to sell tickets. John Boydell died before the lottery was drawn on 28 January 1805, but lived long enough to see each of the 22,000 tickets purchased at three guineas apiece (£270 each in modern terms). To encourage ticket sales and reduce unsold inventory, every purchaser was guaranteed to receive a print worth one guinea from the Boydell company's stock. There were 64 winning tickets for major prizes, the highest being the gallery itself and its collection of paintings. This went to William Tassie, a gem engraver and cameo modeller, of Leicester Fields (now Leicester Square). Josiah offered to buy the gallery and its paintings back from Tassie for £10,000 (worth about £750,000 now), but Tassie refused and auctioned the paintings at Christie's. The painting collection and two reliefs by Anne Damer fetched a total of £6,181 18s. 6d. The Banks sculpture group from the façade was initially intended to be kept as a monument for Boydell's tomb. Instead, it remained part of the façade of the building in its new guise as the British Institution until the building was torn down in 1868–69. The Banks sculpture was then moved to Stratford-upon-Avon and re-erected in New Place Garden between June and November 1870. The lottery saved Josiah from bankruptcy and earned him £45,000, enabling him to begin business again as a printer.

== Legacy ==
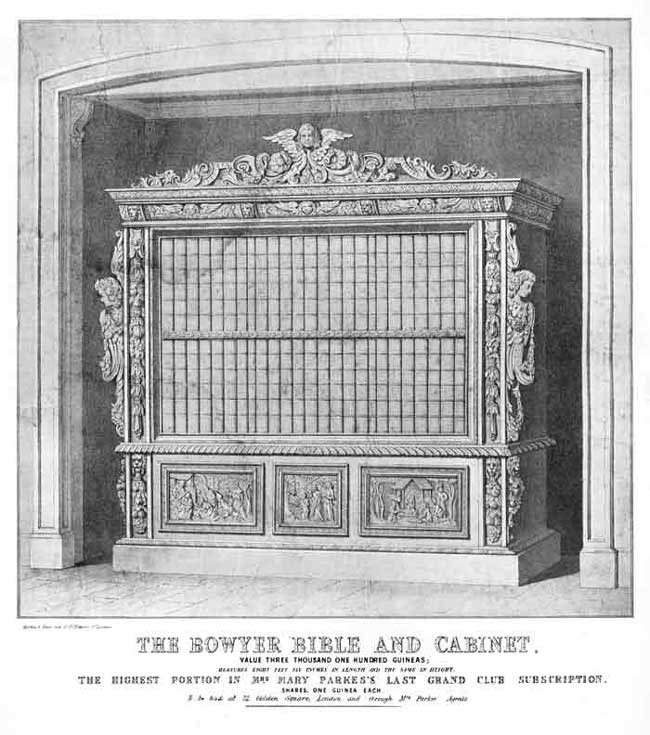
Both Robert Bowyer and Thomas Macklin embarked on illustrated editions of the Bible which were eventually joined together into "Bowyer's Bible".

From the outset, Boydell's project inspired imitators. In April 1788, after the announcement of the Shakespeare Gallery, but a year before its opening, Thomas Macklin opened a Gallery of the Poets in the former Royal Academy building on the south side of Pall Mall. The first exhibition featured one work from each of 19 artists, including Fuseli, Reynolds, and Thomas Gainsborough. The gallery added new paintings of subjects from poetry each year, and from 1790 supplemented these with scenes from the Bible. The Gallery of the Poets closed in 1797, and its contents were offered by lottery. This did not deter Henry Fuseli from opening a Milton Gallery in the same building in 1799. Another such venture was the Historic Gallery opened by Robert Bowyer in Schomberg House at 87 Pall Mall in about 1793. The gallery accumulated 60 paintings (many by the same artists who worked for Boydell) commissioned to illustrate a new edition of David Hume's The History of Great Britain. Ultimately, Bowyer had to seek parliamentary approval for a sale by lottery in 1805, and the other ventures, like Boydell's, also ended in financial failure.

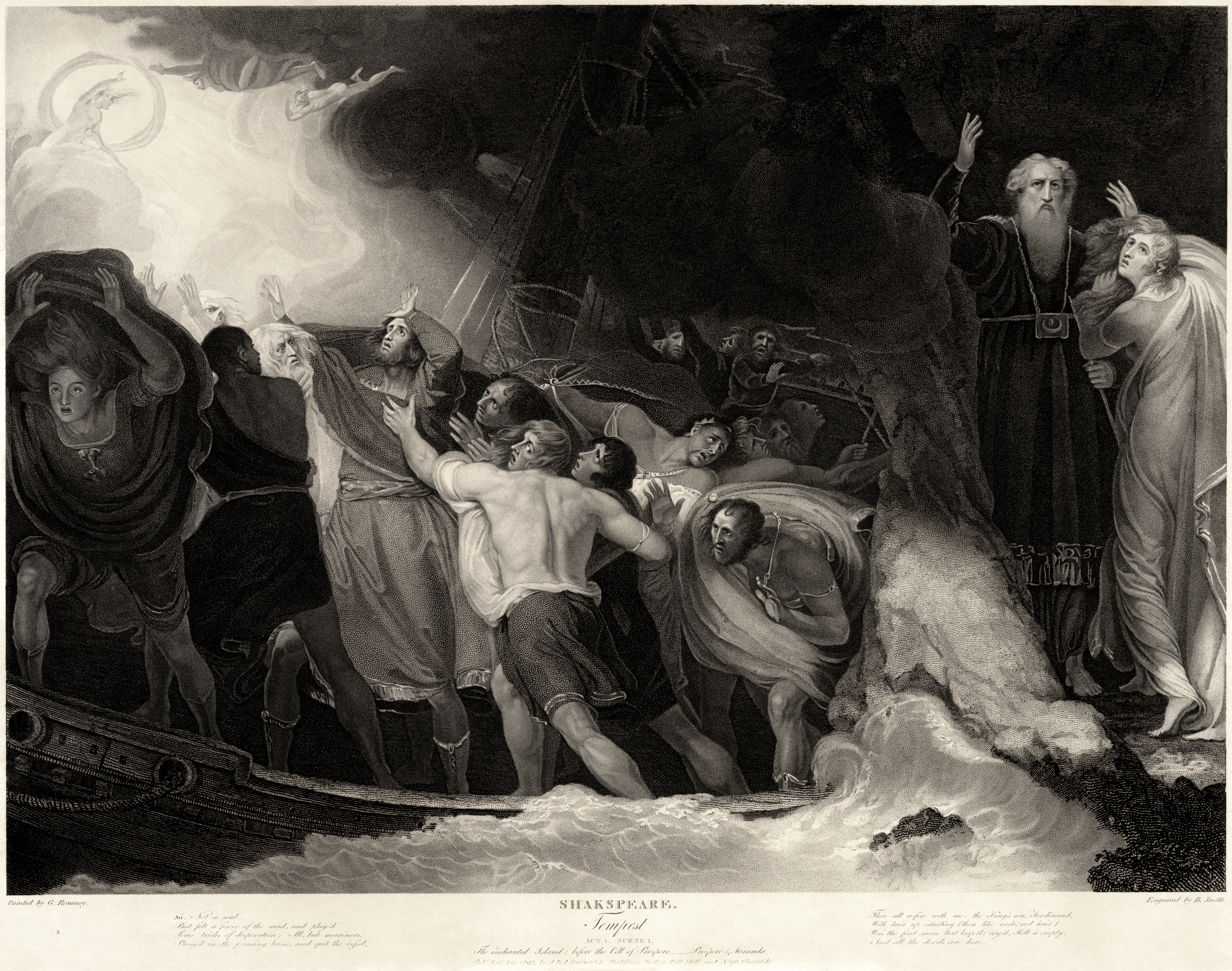
The Tempest, Act I, Scene I, engraved by Benjamin Smith after a painting by George Romney.

The building in Pall Mall was purchased in 1805 by the British Institution, a private club of connoisseurs founded that year to hold exhibitions. It remained an important part of the London art scene until disbanded in 1867, typically holding a Spring exhibition of new works for sale from the start of February to the first week of May, and a loan exhibition of old masters, generally not for sale, from the first week of June to the end of August.

The paintings and engravings that were part of the Boydell Gallery affected the way Shakespeare's plays were staged, acted, and illustrated in the 19th century. They also became the subject of criticism in important works such as Romantic poet and essayist Samuel Taylor Coleridge's "Lectures on Shakespeare" and William Hazlitt's dramatic criticism. Despite Charles Lamb's criticism of the Gallery's productions, Charles and Mary Lamb's children's book, Tales from Shakespeare (1807), was illustrated using plates from the project.

The Boydell enterprise's most enduring legacy was the folio. It was reissued throughout the 19th century, and in 1867, "by the aid of photography the whole series, excepting the portraits of their Majesties George III. and Queen Charlotte, is now presented in a handy form, suitable for ordinary libraries or the drawing-room table, and offered as an appropriate memorial of the tercentenary celebration of the poet's birth". Scholars have described Boydell's folio as a precursor to the modern coffee table book.

== List of art works ==
The Folio and Illustrated Edition lists were taken from Friedman's Boydell's Shakespeare Gallery.

=== Sculptures ===
- Shakespeare attended by Painting and Poetry by Thomas Banks (on façade of gallery building)
  - Present location: New Place Gardens, Stratford-upon-Avon
- Coriolanus by Anne Seymour Damer (bas relief)
- Antony and Cleopatra by Anne Seymour Damer (bas relief)

=== Paintings ===
The Paintings list is derived from the numbered catalogue The exhibition of the Shakspeare gallery, Pall-Mall: being the last time the pictures can ever be seen as an entire collection (London: W. Bulmer & Co., 1805), The Boydell Shakespeare Gallery edited by Walter Pape and Frederick Burwick (Bottrop: Peter Pomp, 1996), and "What Jane Saw".

Boydell Shakespeare Gallery list of paintings
Boydell number	Artist	Play title	Act, scene (#.#)	Location	Image
1	James Northcote	Richard II	5.2	Royal Albert Memorial Museum	
2	James Northcote	Richard III	4.3	Collection of Richard Herner, National Trust	
3	John Opie	The Winter's Tale	2.3	Northbrook Sale, Straton Park, 27 November 1929	
4	Robert Smirke	The Taming of the Shrew	Induction		
5	Thomas Kirk	Titus Andronicus	4.1		
6	William Hamilton	Twelfth Night	5.1		
7	William Hamilton	Love's Labour's Lost	4.1		
8	John Opie	Henry VI, Part 1	2.3		
9	William Hamilton	The Winter's Tale	5.3	Christie's, 24 July 1953, no. 40	
10	James Northcote	King John	4.1	Royal Shakespeare Company	
11	Joshua Reynolds	Macbeth	4.1	Petworth House	
12	John Hoppner	Cymbeline	3.4	Christie's, C.K.M. Neeld Sale, 16 November 1962, no. 86	
13	Joshua Reynolds	Henry VI, Part 2	3.3	Petworth House	
14	Henry Fuseli	King Lear	1.1	Art Gallery of Ontario	
15	William Hamilton	As You Like It	5.4	Brighton and Hove Museums and Art Galleries	
16	Robert Smirke	Henry VI, Part 1	2.2		
17	James Northcote	Henry VI, Part 3	5.7		
18	Robert Smirke	The Merry Wives of Windsor	5.5		
19	Thomas Stothard	Henry VIII	1.4		
20	William Hamilton	Much Ado About Nothing	4.1	Christie's, 24 July 1953, no. 41	
21	Henry Fuseli	Henry VI, Part 2	5.4		
22	Henry Howard	Timon of Athens	4.1		
23	Thomas Kirk	Titus Andronicus	4.2	Stratford-upon-Avon	
24	Robert Smirke	As You Like It	4.3		
25	Robert Smirke	The Merry Wives of Windsor	4.1	R. Hall McCormick sale New York, 15 April 1920, no. 28, as The New Page	
26	Francis Wheatley	All's Well That Ends Well	1.3		
27	William Hamilton	Twelfth Night	1.5		
28	Richard Westall	Cymbeline	3.6	Folger Shakespeare Library	
29	Richard Westall	Cymbeline	2.2		
30	William Hamilton	Twelfth Night	4.3	Folger Shakespeare Library	
31	William Hamilton	Henry VI, Part 1	5.4		
32	William Hamilton	Henry VI, Part 3	5.5		
33	William Hamilton	Henry VI, Part 3	3.2	Christie's, 31 March 1967	
34	William Hamilton	Twelfth Night	2.3	Folger Shakespeare Library	
35	Francis Wheatley	Love's Labour's Lost	5.2		
36	Francis Wheatley	All's Well That Ends Well	2.3	Folger Shakespeare Library	
37	Richard Westall	Henry VIII	5.1		
38	Richard Westall	Macbeth	3.4		
39	Richard Westall	Macbeth	5.1		
40	Richard Westall	Richard III	3.4		
41	Josiah Boydell	Othello	5.2		
42	Robert Smirke	King Lear	4.7	Folger Shakespeare Library	
43	Henry Howard	Timon of Athens	1.2		
44	Robert Ker Porter	Coriolanus	4.5		
45	Richard Westall	Henry V	3.3		
46	Richard Westall	Macbeth	1.3		
47	Robert Ker Porter	Coriolanus	1.3		
48	Richard Westall	Julius Caesar	3.1		
49	Samuel Woodforde	Titus Andronicus	2.3	Stratford-upon-Avon	
50	Richard Westall	King John	3.4		
51	Richard Westall	Henry VIII	4.2		
52	Richard Westall	Hamlet	3.4		
53	Robert Smirke	As You Like It	2.6		
54	Robert Smirke	Romeo and Juliet	2.5	R. Hall McCormick sale New York, 15 April 1920, no. 29, as The Obdurate Mother	
55	Robert Smirke	Henry IV, Part 1	5.4		
56	Robert Smirke	Measure for Measure	2.4		
57	William Hamilton	Othello	4.2		
58	Richard Westall	Hamlet	4.7	Hood Museum of Art	
59	William Hamilton	Richard II	3.2	Sir John Soane's Museum	
60	William Hamilton	Henry VI, Part 2	3.2		
61	Robert Ker Porter	King John	4.3		
62	Richard Westall	Julius Caesar	5.5		
63	William Hamilton	The Tempest	3.1	Christie's, 4 August 1944, no. 58	
64	William Hamilton	Henry VI, Part 2	2.2		
65	William Hamilton	Richard II	5.2	Folger Shakespeare Library	
66	William Hamilton	Henry VI, Part 1	2.5		
67	William Hamilton	The Winter's Tale	2.1		
68	Richard Westall	The Merchant of Venice	3.2		
69	William Hamilton	The Winter's Tale	2.3		
70	Richard Westall	Cymbeline	2.4		
71	Henry Fuseli	Hamlet	1.4		
72	Richard Westall	Macbeth	1.5		
73	Henry Tresham	Antony and Cleopatra	3.9		
74	Robert Smirke	Henry IV, Part 1	2.4	Bob Jones University	
75	Robert Smirke	Much Ado About Nothing	4.2	Royal Shakespeare Company	
76	James Northcote	Henry VI, Part 1	2.5	Northbrook Sale, Straton Park, 27 November 1929, no. 493	
77	Francis Wheatley	The Winter's Tale	4.3	Royal Shakespeare Company	
78	James Northcote	Romeo and Juliet	5.3	Folger Shakespeare Library	
79	Angelica Kauffman	Troilus and Cressida	5.2	Petworth House	
80	Robert Smirke	The Merry Wives of Windsor	1.1	Royal Shakespeare Company; Anne Page only, Folger Shakespeare Library	
81	John Opie	Romeo and Juliet	4.5	Christie's, 1892	
82	Robert Smirke	The Merchant of Venice	2.5	Stratford-upon-Avon	
83	William Miller	Henry VI, Part 3	4.5		
84	Benjamin West	King Lear	3.4	Museum of Fine Arts, Boston; Rhode Island School of Design	
85	Raphael Lamar West	As You Like It	4.3		
86	Angelica Kauffman	The Two Gentlemen of Verona	5.3	Davis Museum and Cultural Center at Wellesley College	
87	Henry Fuseli	The Tempest	1.2	York Museums Trust, Head of Prospero only	
88	Benjamin West	Hamlet	4.5	Cincinnati Art Museum	
89	George Romney	Troilus and Cressida	2.2	Mrs. Tankerville Chamberlayne	
90	Richard Westall	Julius Caesar	4.3		
91	John Graham	Othello	5.2		
92	Thomas Kirk	Troilus and Cressida	1.2		
93	Henry Tresham	Antony and Cleopatra	5.2		
94	Robert Smirke	Henry IV, Part 1	2.3		
95	Thomas Stothard	The Two Gentlemen of Verona	5.3	Stratford, Connecticut	
96	Francis Wheatley	The Comedy of Errors	1.1	Stratford-upon-Avon	
97	Robert Smirke	The Tempest	2.2	Folger Shakespeare Library	
98	Robert Smirke	King Lear	3.4		
99	Robert Smirke	Measure for Measure	4.2		
100	Francis Wheatley	The Comedy of Errors	4.3		
101	John Francis Rigaud	Romeo and Juliet	2.4	Agnew, 1972	
102	Francis Wheatley	Love's Labour's Lost	4.2		
103	Robert Smirke	Henry IV, Part 1	2.1		
104	Robert Smirke	The Merry Wives of Windsor	1.4		
105	Robert Smirke	Henry IV, Part 2	5.5	Folger Shakespeare Library	
106	Robert Smirke	The Merry Wives of Windsor	5.5		
107	Robert Smirke	Henry IV, Part 2	4.4		
108	Robert Smirke	King Lear	1.1		
109	Robert Smirke	As You Like It	2.7	Yale Center for British Art; A set of seven scenes showing the Ages of Man. The Soldier illustrated.	
110	William Hamilton	The Winter's Tale	4.3		
111	William Hamilton	The Tempest	1.2		
112	Richard Westall	Henry VIII	1.2		
113	Richard Westall	The Merchant of Venice	3.3	Folger Shakespeare Library	
114	George Romney	The Tempest	1.1	Bolton Museum, Head of Prospero only	
115	Josiah Boydell	Henry IV, Part 2	4.4		
116	Joseph Wright of Derby	The Winter's Tale	3.3	Art Gallery of Ontario	
117	Josiah Boydell	Henry IV, Part 2	4.4		
118	Joseph Wright of Derby	The Tempest	4.1		
119	Josiah Boydell	Henry VI, Part 1	2.4		
120	Thomas Kirk	Measure for Measure	5.1	Christie's, 11 December 1964	
121	Francis Wheatley	The Tempest	5.1		
122	James Barry	King Lear	5.3	Tate	
123	Henry Fuseli	A Midsummer Night's Dream	4.1	Tate	
124	Henry Fuseli	A Midsummer Night's Dream	2.1	Kloster Allerheiligen, Schaffhausen	
125	Joshua Reynolds	A Midsummer Night's Dream	2.3	Private collection	
126	Matthew Peters	Much Ado About Nothing	3.1	Carnegie Museum of Art	
127	James Northcote	Richard III	3.1		
128	Matthew Peters	The Merry Wives of Windsor	3.3	Christie's, 3 July 1964	
129	James Northcote	Richard III	4.3	Petworth House	
130	Henry Fuseli	Henry V	2.2	Royal Shakespeare Company	
131	Richard Westall	Henry IV, Part 1	3.1	Christie's, C.K.M. Neeld Sale, 16 November 1962, no. 91	
132	Francis Wheatley	The Taming of the Shrew	3.2		
133	John Opie	Timon of Athens	4.3		
134	Henry Fuseli	A Midsummer Night's Dream	4.1	Kunstmuseum Winterthur	
135	John Francis Rigaud	Henry IV, Part 1	5.4		
136	Richard Westall	Henry VIII	4.2	Folger Shakespeare Library	
137	William Hodges	As You Like It	2.1	Yale Center for British Art	
138	George Romney	Infant Shakespeare		Folger Shakespeare Library	
139	William Hodges	The Merchant of Venice	5.1		
140	James Durno	Henry IV, Part 2	3.2	Sotheby's 14 October 1953, small version.	
141	James Durno	The Merry Wives of Windsor	4.2	Sir John Soane's Museum	
142	Mather Brown	Richard II	4.1		
143	Thomas Stothard	Othello	2.1	Royal Shakespeare Company	
144	William Miller	Romeo and Juliet	1.5		
145	Johann Heinrich Ramberg	Twelfth Night	3.4	Yale Center for British Art	
146	Josiah Boydell	Henry VI, Part 3	2.5		
147	William Hamilton	Cymbeline	1.1		
148	Julius Caesar Ibbetson	The Taming of the Shrew	4.1	Folger Shakespeare Library	
149	Julius Caesar Ibbetson	The Taming of the Shrew	4.5	Folger Shakespeare Library	
150	Josiah Boydell	Othello	5.2		
151	Francis Wheatley	Much Ado About Nothing	3.3		
152	Matthew Peters	Henry VIII	5.4	Beaverbrook Art Gallery	
153	John Francis Rigaud	The Comedy of Errors	5.1		
154	Matthew Peters	The Merry Wives of Windsor	2.1	Christie's, 16 March 1956, no. 110	
155	John Downman	As You Like It	1.2		
156	Francis Wheatley	All's Well That Ends Well	5.3		
157	Henry Fuseli	Macbeth	1.3		
158	Robert Smirke	Measure for Measure	2.1	Royal Shakespeare Company	
159	James Northcote	Henry VI, Part 3	1.3		
160	Matthew Peters	Henry VIII	3.1		
161	Gavin Hamilton	Coriolanus	5.3		
162	John Opie	Henry VI, Part 2	1.4		
163	Francis Wheatley	Much Ado About Nothing	5.4		
164	Henry Tresham	Antony and Cleopatra	4.4		
165	Josiah Boydell	Othello	1.3		
166	Francis Wheatley	A Midsummer Night's Dream	4.1		
167	Mr E Edwards	The Two Gentlemen of Verona	2.1		

=== Folio engravings ===
Volume I

- Titlepage vignette: Coriolanus by William Satchwell Leney after Anne Seymour Damer
- Frontispiece: Portrait of George III by Benjamin Smith after William Beechey
- Shakespeare attended by Painting and Poetry by Benjamin Smith after Thomas Banks
- Infant Shakespeare by Benjamin Smith after George Romney
- Tempest, Act I, scene 1 by Benjamin Smith after George Romney
- Tempest, Act I, scene 2 by Jean-Pierre Simon after Henry Fuseli
- Tempest, Act IV, scene 1 by Robert Thew after Joseph Wright of Derby
- Tempest, Act V, scene 1 by Caroline Watson after Francis Wheatley
- Two Gentlemen of Verona, Act V, scene 3 by Luigi Schiavonetti after Angelica Kauffman
- Merry Wives of Windsor, Act I, scene 1 by Jean-Pierre Simon after Robert Smirke
- Merry Wives of Windsor, Act II, scene 1 by Robert Thew after William Peters
- Merry Wives of Windsor, Act III, scene 3 by Jean-Pierre Simon after Matthew Peters
- Merry Wives of Windsor, Act IV, scene 2 by Thomas Ryder after James Durno
- Merry Wives of Windsor, Act V, scene 5 by Isaac Taylor, Jr. after Robert Smirke
- Measure for Measure, Act I, scene 1 by Thomas Ryder after Robert Smirke
- Measure for Measure, Act V, scene 1 by Jean-Pierre Simon after Thomas Kirk
- Comedy of Errors, Act V, scene 1 by Charles Gauthier Playter after John Francis Rigaud
- Much Ado About Nothing, Act III, scene 1 by Jean-Pierre Simon after Matthew Peters
- Much Ado About Nothing, Act IV, scene 1 by Jean-Pierre Simon after William Hamilton
- Much Ado About Nothing, Act IV, scene 2 by John Ogborne after Robert Smirke
- Love's Labour Lost, Act IV, scene 1 by Thomas Ryder after William Hamilton
- Midsummer-Night's Dream, Act II, scene 1 by Jean-Pierre Simon after Henry Fuseli
- Midsummer-Night's Dream, Act IV, scene 1 by Jean-Pierre Simon, after Henry Fuseli
- Merchant of Venice, Act II, scene 5 by Jean-Pierre Simon after Robert Smirke
- Merchant of Venice, Act V, scene 1 by John Browne after William Hodges
- As You Like It, Act I, scene 2 by William Satchwell Leney after John Downman
- As You Like It, Act II, scene 1 by Samuel Middiman after William Hodges
- As You Like It, Act IV, scene 3 by William Charles Wilson after Raphael Lamar West
- As You Like It, Act V, scene 4 by Jean-Pierre Simon after William Hamilton
- Taming of the Shrew, Introduction, scene 2 by Robert Thew after Robert Smirke
- Taming of the Shrew, Act III, scene 2 by Jean-Pierre Simon after Francis Wheatley
- All's Well That Ends Well, Act V, scene 3 by Georg Siegmund and Johann Gottlieb Facius after Francis Wheatley
- Twelfth Night, Act III, scene 4 by Thomas Ryder after Johann Heinrich Ramberg
- Twelfth Night, Act V, scene 1 by Francesco Bartolozzi after William Hamilton
- Winter's Tale, Act II, scene 3 by Jean-Pierre Simon after John Opie
- Winter's Tale, Act III, scene 3 by Samuel Middiman after Joseph Wright of Derby
- Winter's Tale, Act IV, scene 3 by James Fittler after Francis Wheatley
- Winter's Tale, Act V, scene 3 by Robert Thew after William Hamilton
- Macbeth, Act I, scene 3 by James Caldwell after Henry Fuseli
- Macbeth, Act I, scene 5 by James Parker after Richard Westall
- Macbeth, Act IV, scene 1 by Robert Thew after Joshua Reynolds
- As You Like It, The Seven Ages, Act II, scene 7 by Petro William Tomkins after Robert Smirke
- As You Like It, The Seven Ages, Second Age, Act II, scene 7 by John Ogborne after Robert Smirke
- As You Like It, The Seven Ages, Third Age, Act II, scene 7 by Robert Thew after Robert Smirke
- As You Like It, The Seven Ages, Fourth Age, Act II, scene 7 by John Ogborne after Robert Smirke
- As You Like It, The Seven Ages, Fifth Age, Act II, scene 7 by Jean-Pierre Simon after Robert Smirke
- As You Like It, The Seven Ages, Sixth Age, Act II, scene 7 by William Satchwell Leney after Robert Smirke
- As You Like It, The Seven Ages, Seventh Age, Act II, scene 7 by Jean-Pierre Simon after Robert Smirke

Volume II

- Antony and Cleopatra Terracotta bas relief title page vignette by Thomas Hellyer after Anne S. Damer
- Portrait of Queen Charlotte by Thomas Ryder and Thomas Ryder, Jr. after William Beechey
- King John, Act IV, scene 1 by Robert Thew after James Northcote
- King Richard II, Act IV, scene 1 by Benjamin Smith after Mather Browne
- King Richard II, Act V, scene 2 by Robert Thew after James Northcote
- Henry IV, part 1, Act II, scene 2 by Samuel Middiman Robert Smirke and Joseph Farington
- Henry IV, part 1, Act II, scene 4 by Robert Thew after Robert Smirke
- Henry IV, part 1, Act III, scene 1 by Jean-Pierre Simon after Richard Westall
- Henry IV, part 1, Act V, scene 4 by Thomas Ryder after John Francis Rigaud
- Henry IV, part 2, Act II, scene 4 by William Satchwell Leney after Henry Fuseli
- Henry IV, part 2, Act III, scene 2 by Thomas Ryder after James Durno
- Henry IV, part 2, Act IV, scene 4 by Robert Thew after Josiah Boydell – Prince Henry Taking the Crown
- Henry IV, part 2, Act IV, scene 4 by Robert Thew after Josiah Boydell – Prince Henry's Apology
- Henry V, Act II, scene 2 by Robert Thew after Henry Fuseli
- Henry VI, part 1, Act II, scene 3 by Robert Thew after John Opie
- Henry VI, part 1, Act II, scene 4 by John Ogborne after Josiah Boydell
- Henry VI, part 1, Act II, scene 5 by Robert Thew after James Northcote
- Henry VI, part 2, Act I, scene 4 by Charles Gauthier Playter and Robert Thew after John Opie
- Henry VI, part 2, Act III, scene 3 by Caroline Watson after Joshua Reynolds
- Henry VI, part 3, Act I, scene 3 by Charles Gauthier Playter and Thomas Ryder after James Northcote
- Henry VI, part 3, Act II, scene 5 by John Ogborne after Josiah Boydell
- Henry VI, part 3, Act IV, scene 5 by Jean Baptiste Michel and William Satchwell Leney after William Miller
- Henry VI, part 3, Act V, scene 7 by Jean Baptiste Michel after James Northcote
- Richard III, Act III, scene 1 by Robert Thew after James Northcote
- Richard III, Act IV, scene 3 by Francis Legat after James Northcote – The Young Princes Murdered in the Tower
- Richard III, Act IV, scene 3 by William Skelton after James Northcote – Burying of the Royal Children
- Henry VIII, Act I, scene 4 by Isaac Taylor, Jr. after Thomas Stothard
- Henry VIII, Act III, scene 1 by Robert Thew after Matthew Peters
- Henry VIII, Act IV, scene 2 by Robert Thew after Richard Westall
- Henry VIII, Act V, scene 4 by Joseph Collyer after Matthew Peters
- Coriolanus, Act V, scene 3 by James Caldwell after Gavin Hamilton
- Julius Cæsar, Act IV, scene 3 by Edward Scriven after Richard Westall
- Antony and Cleopatra, Act III, scene 9 by Georg Siegmund and Johann Gottlieb Facius after Henry Tresham
- Timon of Athens, Act IV, scene 3 by Robert Thew after John Opie
- Titus Andronicus, Act IV, scene 1 painted and engraved by Thomas Kirk
- Troilus and Cressida, Act II, scene 2 by Francis Legat after George Romney
- Troilus and Cressida, Act V, scene 2 by Luigi Schiavonetti after Angelica Kauffman
- Cymbeline, Act I, scene 2 by Thomas Burke after William Hamilton
- Cymbeline, Act III, scene 4 by Robert Thew after John Hoppner
- King Lear, Act I, scene 1 by Richard Earlom after Henry Fuseli
- King Lear in the Storm from King Lear, Act III, scene 4 by William Sharp after Benjamin West
- King Lear, Act V, scene 3 by Francis Legat after James Barry
- Romeo and Juliet, Act I, scene 5 by Georg Siegmund and Johann Gottlieb Facius after William Miller
- Romeo and Juliet, Act IV, scene 5 by Georg Siegmund and Johann Gottlieb Facius after John Opie
- Romeo and Juliet, Act V, scene 3 by Jean-Pierre Simon after James Northcote
- Hamlet, Act I, scene 4 by Robert Thew after Henry Fuseli
- Hamlet, Act IV, scene 5 by Francis Legat after Benjamin West
- Othello, Act II, scene 1 by Thomas Ryder after Thomas Stothard
- A Bedchamber, Desdemona in Bed Asleep from Othello, Act V, scene 2, by William Satchwell Leney after John Graham
- Cymbeline. Act III, scene 6 by Thomas Gaugain after Richard Westall
- Shakespeare Nursed by Tragedy and Comedy by Benjamin Smith after George Romney
- Desdemona in Bed Asleep from Othello, Act V, scene 2, by William Satchwell Leney after Josiah Boydell

=== Illustrated edition ===
Volume I
The Tempest

- Act I, scene 2 by James Parker after William Hamilton
- Act II, scene 2 by William Charles Wilson after Robert Smirke
- Ferdinand and Miranda (Act III, scene 1) by Anker Smith after William Hamilton

Two Gentlemen of Verona

- Act V, scene 3 by John Ogborne after Thomas Stothard

Merry Wives of Windsor

- Mrs. Page with a Letter (Act II, scene 1) by Joseph Saunders after Matthew Peters
- Act I, scene 1 by Moses Haughton after Robert Smirke
- Act I, scene 4 by Anker Smith after Robert Smirke
- Act IV, scene 1 by Thomas Holloway after Robert Smirke
- Act V, scene 5 by William Sharpe after Robert Smirke

Measure for Measure

- Act II, scene 4 by William Charles Wilson after Robert Smirke
- Act IV, scene 3 by William Charles Wilson after Robert Smirke

Volume II
The Comedy of Errors

- Act I, scene 1 by James Neagle after Francis Wheatley
- Act IV, scene 4 by James Stow after Francis Wheatley

Much Ado About Nothing

- Hero, Ursula, and Beatrice (Act III, scene 1) by James Heath after Matthew Peters
- Borachio, Conrade and Watchmen (Act III, scene 3) by George Noble after Francis Wheatley
- Act IV, scene 1 by Thomas Milton and Testaloni after William Hamilton
- Examination (Act IV, scene 2) by James Heath after Robert Smirke
- Act V, scene 4 by James Fittler after Francis Wheatley

Love's Labour's Lost

- Act IV, scene 2 by James Neagle after Francis Wheatley
- Act V, scene 2 by William Skelton after Francis Wheatley

A Midsummer Night's Dream

- Puck (Act II, scene 1) by James Parker after Henry Fuseli
- Puck (Act II, scene 2) by Luigi Schiavonetti after Joshua Reynolds

Volume III
Merchant of Venice

- Act III, scene 2 by George Noble after Richard Westall
- Act III, scene 3 by James Parker after Richard Westall

As You Like It

- Jacques and the Wounded Stag (Act II, scene 1) by Samuel Middiman after William Hodges
- Act II, scene 6 by George Noble after Robert Smirke
- Act IV, scene 3 by William Charles Wilson after Robert Smirke
- Act V, scene 4 by Luigi Schiavonetti after William Hamilton

The Taming of the Shrew

- Act IV, scene 1 by Anker Smith after Julius Caesar Ibbetson
- Act IV, scene 5 by Isaac Taylor, Jr. after Julius Caesar Ibbetson

All's Well That Ends Well

- Act I, scene 3 by Francis Legat after Francis Wheatley
- Act II, scene 3 by Luigi Schiavonetti after Francis Wheatley

Volume IV
Twelfth-Night

- Olivia, Viola and Maria (Act I, scene 5) by James Caldwell after William Hamilton
- Sir Toby, Sir Andrew and Maria (Act II, scene 3) by James Fittler after William Hamilton
- Act IV, scene 3 by William Angus after William Hamilton

The Winter's Tale

- Leontes and Hermione (Act II, scene 1) by James Fittler after William Hamilton
- Paulina, Child, Leontes, and Antigonus (Act II, scene 3) by Francesco Bartolozzi after William Hamilton
- The Shepherd's Cot (Act IV, scene 3) by Joseph Collyer after William Hamilton

Macbeth

- Act I, scene 3 by James Stow after Richard Westall
- Act III, scene 4 by James Parker after Richard Westall
- Act V, scene 1 by William Charles Wilson after Richard Westall

King John

- Act IV, scene 3 by Isaac Taylor after Robert Ker Porter
- Act III, scene 4 by Anker Smith after Richard Westall

Volume V
King Richard II

- Act III, scene 2 by James Parker after William Hamilton
- Act V, scene 2 by James Stow after William Hamilton

First Part of King Henry IV

- Act II, scene 1 by James Fittler after Robert Smirke
- Act II, scene 3 by James Neagle after Robert Smirke
- Act V, scene 4 by James Neagle after Robert Smirke

Second Part of King Henry IV

- Act IV, scene 4 by William Charles Wilson after Robert Smirke
- Act V, scene 5 by Joseph Collyer after Robert Smirke

King Henry V

- Act III, scene 3 by James Stow after Richard Westall

Volume VI
First Part of King Henry VI

- Act II, scene 4 by John Ogborne after Josiah Boydell
- Act II, scene 5 by Isaac Taylor after William Hamilton
- Death of Mortimer (Act II, scene 5) by Andrew Gray after James Northcote
- Joan of Arc and the Furies (Act V, scene 4) by Anker Smith after William Hamilton

Second Part of King Henry VI

- Act II, scene 2 by Anker Smith after William Hamilton
- Act III, scene 2 by Isaac Taylor after William Hamilton
- Death of Cardinal Beaufort (Act III, scene 3) by Andrew Gray after Joshua Reynolds

Third Part of King Henry VI

- Act III, scene 2 by Thomas Holloway after William Hamilton
- Act V, scene 5 by Thomas Holloway after William Hamilton

Richard III

- Meeting of the Young Princes (Act III, scene 1) by J. Barlow after James Northcote
- Act III, scene 4 by Anker Smith after Richard Westall
- The Young Princes Murdered in the Tower (Act IV, scene 3) by James Heath after James Northcote

Volume VII
King Henry VIII

- Act I, scene 4 by Isaac Taylor after Thomas Stothard
- Wolsey Disgraced (Act III, scene 2) by William Charles Wilson after Richard Westall
- Act IV, scene 2 by James Parker after Richard Westall
- Act V, scene 1 by William Satchwell Leney after Richard Westall

Coriolanus

- Act I, scene 3 by James Stow after Robert Ker Porter
- Act IV, scene 5 by James Parker after Robert Ker Porter

Julius Cæsar

- Act III, scene 1 by James Parker after Richard Westall
- Act V, scene 5 by George Noble after Richard Westall

Antony and Cleopatra

- Act IV, scene 4 by Charles Turner Warren and George Noble after Henry Tresham
- Death of Cleopatra (Act V, scene 2) by George Noble after Henry Tresham

Volume VIII
Timon of Athens

- Act I, scene 2 by Richard Rhodes after Henry Howard
- Act IV, scene 1 by Isaac Taylor after Henry Howard

Titus Andronicus

- Act II, scene 3 by Anker Smith after Samuel Woodforde
- Act IV, scene 1 by Burnet Reading after Thomas Kirk
- Act IV, scene 2 by Jacob Hogg after Thomas Kirk

Troilus and Cressida

- Act I, scene 2 by Charles Turner Warren after Thomas Kirk
- Act V, scene 3 by James Fittler after Thomas Kirk

Cymbeline

- Act II, scene 2 by James Stow after Richard Westall
- Act II, scene 4 by William Charles Wilson after Richard Westall
- Act III, scene 6 by James Parker after Richard Westall

Volume IX
King Lear

- Act I, scene 1 by William Sharpe after Robert Smirke
- Act III, scene 4 by Luigi Schiavonetti after Robert Smirke
- Act IV, scene 7 by Anker Smith after Robert Smirke

Romeo and Juliet

- Act I, scene 5 by Anker Smith after William Miller
- Act II, scene 5 by James Parker after Robert Smirke
- Act III, scene 5 by James Stow after John Francis Rigaud
- Capulet Finds Juliet Dead (Act IV, scene 5) by Jean Pierre Simon and William Blake after John Opie
- Act V, scene 3 by James Heath after James Northcote

Hamlet

- Act III, scene 4 by William Charles Wilson after Richard Westall
- Act IV, scene 7 by James Parker after Richard Westall

Othello

- Act IV, scene 2 by Andrew Michel after Robert Ker Porter
- Desdemona Asleep (Act V, scene 2) by Andrew Michel after Josiah Boydell

As You Like It

- Act II, scene 7 by Robert Thew (no. 99), Peltro William Tomkins (no. 97), Jean Pierre Simon (no. 101, 103), John Ogborne (no. 98, 100), and William Satchwell Leney (no. 102) after Robert Smirke
