= James Durno =

British painter

James Durno (c.1745–1795) was a British historical painter who spent most of his career in Rome.

== Life ==
Durno was born in around 1745, the son of a brewery proprietor who lived the later part of his life in an area of West London then known as the "Kensington Gravel Pits" (approximately the current Notting Hill Gate).

In February 1769 Durno was admitted to the Royal Academy Schools, where he studied under Andrea Casali, and Benjamin West. He also worked as a copyist for West, and in around 1771 assisted John Hamilton Mortimer on his ceiling paintings at Brocket Hall in Hertfordshire. He received a premium of 30 guineas from the Society of Arts in 1771, and the next year was awarded 100 guineas for the best historical painting.

He went to Italy in 1774, arriving in Rome by June of that year. During 1777–78 he lived with the sculptor Thomas Banks and his wife in the Casa Sopra Stalla di Mignanelli. As well as attempting to forge a career as a history painter, Durno worked as a copyist in Rome, his productions including a large copy of Raphael's Transfiguration. This was completed by 1779. Henry Herbert, 10th Earl of Pembroke, who saw it that year, wrote in a letter : "It is most likely the last copy that will ever be done, as the Monks of Montorio swear they will give no more permissions for fear some hurt may come to so valuable an original." Durno wanted £1000 for the painting, and it remained unsold until 1783, when it was bought by the Earl of Bristol, who also purchased at least two history paintings by Durno: The Mouming over the Dead Body of Hector and The Return of Priam with the body of Hector. The copy of the Transfiguration probably the one now in the collection of the National Gallery of Ireland, where it was long attributed to Anton Raphael Mengs.

In Rome Durno painted two pictures for Boydell's Shakespeare Gallery. Both feature the character of Falstaff. In one, an illustration to Henry IV, he is shown raising recruits in the company of Justice Shallow and Silence, while the other illustrates the scene in the Merry Wives of Windsor in which he is disguised as the "Old Woman of Brentford". The latter work was bought by Sir John Soane at the sale of the gallery in 1805, and is now in the collection of Sir John Soane's Museum in London. According to Edward Edwards in his Anecdotes of Painting (1808) "these works did not answer the expectations of those for whom they were painted."

Durno died of fever in Rome on 13 September 1795. The Gentleman's Magazine reported that

He was buried according to the usual custom of interring Protestants in that country. All his brother artists (we mean British artists) attended; and Prince Augustus honoured his funeral by carrying a torch, as did his two gentlemen, and Lord Wycombe, Mr. Amherst, and Mr. Disney Fitch.

His painting Achilles after the Death of Patroclus is in the collection of the Musée des beaux-arts d'Arras:

== Sources ==
- (page 442)
