= William Smith (scholar) =

Dean of Chester and a Greek and Latin scholar (1711–1787)

The Very Revd. Dr William Smith (1711–1787) was Dean of Chester and a Greek and Latin scholar.

Smith was born in Worcester in 1711, the son of the rector of St Nicholas' Church. He was sent to RGS Worcester after which he proceeded to New College, Oxford in 1728. He was made Rector of Holy Trinity, Chester in 1735. He became headmaster of Brentwood School, Essex, in 1748, before leaving in 1753 to become vicar of St George's, Liverpool.

He became Dean of Chester Cathedral in 1758. He remained in this post until his death in 1787. He resigned St George's in 1767, and Holy Trinity in 1780, but he was rector of Handley from 1766 to 1787, and of West Kirby from 1780 to 1787.

Amongst his greatest achievements was the translation of Thucydides' History of the Peloponnesian War and some of his other works as well as the works of Xenophon including A History of Greece.

He is buried in Chester Cathedral with a monument by Thomas Banks.
