= Francis Legat =

Scottish engraver (1755–1809)

Francis Legat (1755 – 7 April 1809) was a Scottish engraver, known particularly for his engravings for the Boydell Shakespeare Gallery.

== Life ==
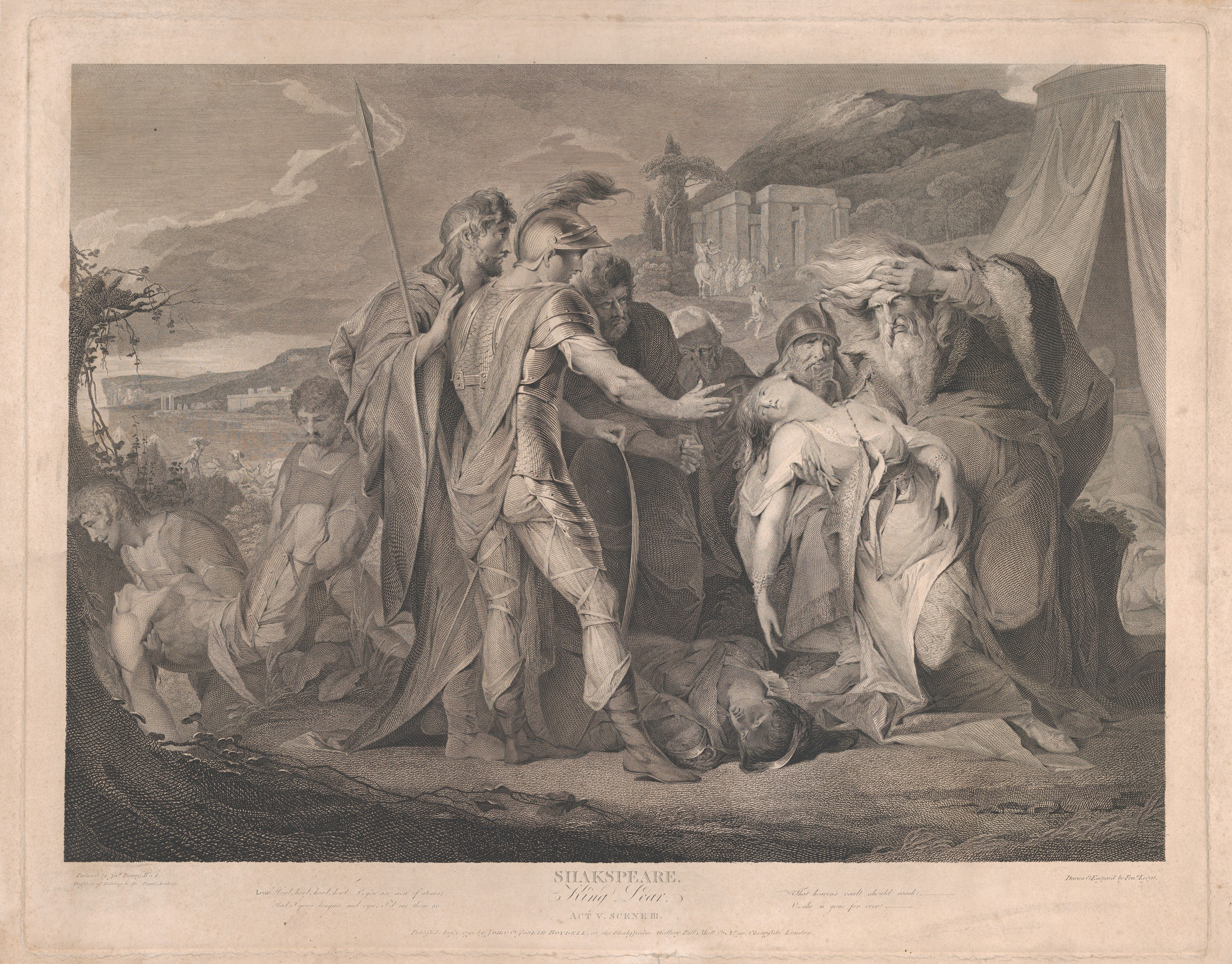
King Lear weeping over the body of Cordelia

Legat was born in 1755 in Edinburgh. He is sometimes stated to have been of French origin, and he may possibly have been a descendant of François Leguat. Legat studied at the Trustees' Academy under Alexander Runciman, and he was a student of the engraver Andrew Bell. According to some accounts he learnt engraving from Sir Robert Strange.

Legat came to London about 1780, and took lodgings at 22 Charles Street, Mayfair, where he engraved for John Boydell Mary Queen of Scots resigning the Crown, from a picture by Gavin Hamilton, and The Continence of Scipio, after Nicolas Poussin. He produced several engravings for Boydell's project the Shakespeare Gallery, including King Lear weeping over the body of Cordelia, after the picture by James Barry. He was among the best paid of the engravers on the project.

About 1790 he left Charles Street for Sloane Square, and in 1797 he moved again to 21 Pleasant Row, Camden Town, where he completed a plate of Cassandra (a portrait of Lady Hamilton) from Troilus and Cressida, after the picture by George Romney.

Legat finally moved in 1799 to 2 Charles Street, where he lived until his death. He engraved there Ophelia and King, Queen, and Laertes in Hamlet, after pictures by Benjamin West. He was appointed historical engraver to the Prince of Wales. Encouraged by his success and the money brought to Boydell by his engravings, Legat determined to publish an engraving on his own account, and secured a picture of The Death of Sir Ralph Abercrombie by Thomas Stothard for that purpose. The subscription list did not fill, and Legat fell into debt.

He suffered from mental depression, and died in Charles Street on 7 April 1809, in his fifty-fifth year. He was buried in the churchyard of St Pancras Old Church. His debts were paid by a friend, Mr Kemp, and the unfinished plate was sold to Mr Bowyer of the Historic Gallery, Pall Mall, who had it completed. Legat was described as quiet and intelligent, with some literary ability.
