= Benjamin Smith (engraver) =

British engraver, printseller and publisher

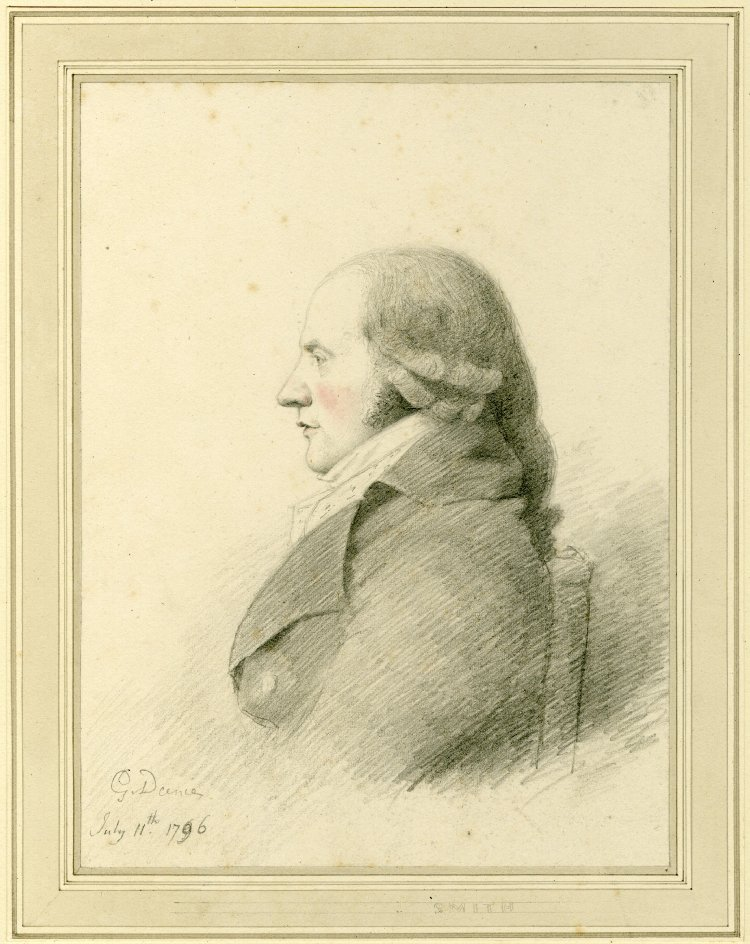
- Benjamin Smith, by George Dance the Younger, 1796
- Born: 1754; London, England
- Died: 1833; Somers Town, London, England
- Education: Francesco Bartolozzi
- Known for: Engraver
- Movement: Stipple
- Spouse: Mary

Benjamin Smith (1754–1833) was a British engraver, printseller and publisher, active from 1786 to 1833. He was born c. 1754 in London. He worked mainly in dot or stipple engraving, producing portraits, illustrations, and allegorical and biblical subjects after prominent artists of the day.

== Biography ==
Smith studied stippling techniques under Francesco Bartolozzi, one of the most famous and sought after engravers of the 18th Century. During his career Smith engraved many fine plates after the designs of contemporary masters such as William Hogarth, William Beechey and George Romney. He also created portrait engravings of such noteworthy individuals as Marquis Cornwallis and George III.

Benjamin Smith, one of the foremost engravers of London, was for some years largely employed by John Boydell, who commissioned him to engrave many of the most important plates for his Shakespeare Gallery and for his Poetical Works of John Milton set, which were published between 1794 and 1797. These were some of Smith's best works. Five were after George Romney, Thomas Banks and Mather Brown for the Shakespeare series. Others included Sigismunda, after William Hogarth; a portrait of Hogarth with his dog Trump; portraits of Lord Cornwallis after John Singleton Copley, George III after Sir William Beechey and Napoleon after Andrea Appiani; The Lord Mayor Newnham taking the Oaths after William Miller; and several allegorical and biblical subjects after John Francis Rigaud and Benjamin West. Among his smaller pieces, some self-published, were portraits of Lord Charlemont, and the actors William Barrymore, William Smith, and Anne and Charles Dibdin.

Smith's pupils included William Holl the Elder, Henry Bryan Hall, Henry Hoppner Meyer, Albin R. Burt, Thomas Uwins and Robert Cabbell Roffe.

Smith died in 1833 at 21 Judd Street, Somers Town.

=== His son ===
In the period 1801 to 1804, Benjamin Smith the Younger born in 1774, worked on Charles Smith's New English Atlas, specifically on the maps for Devon, Sussex and Berkshire.

In 1810 whilst sailing to Portugal for business, Smith and partner engraver Joseph Bye were captured by a French privateer and imprisoned in France for 4 years until peace was declared in 1814. They returned to Edinburgh, where they worked as journeyman engravers for book sellers and map engravers W.H. Lizars.

In 1817 Smith and Bye were convicted at Dover of uttering forged Margate Bank notes and initially sentenced to death. Petitions for clemency included individual petitions from Smith's wife Mary and from William Bengo' Collyer; 7 collective petitions (65 people); and 8 letters, including from Sir Robert Gardiner on behalf of Prince Leopold of Saxe-Coburg (uncle of Queen Victoria, later to be King Leopold I of Belgium); from ex-employer William Home Lizars and his son Daniel Lizars; from publisher John Murray; and from the mayor and justices of the peace for the town and port of Dover. Murray's letter stated that “Bye and Smith shewed great ingenuity in engraving maps but did not excel in engraving written characters” [necessary for forging banknotes]. Smith and Bye were hanged on 27 November 1817. Smith's wife, Mary, had four children and lived in the Battle Bridge (Kings Cross) and Somers Town areas of London.

== Works ==
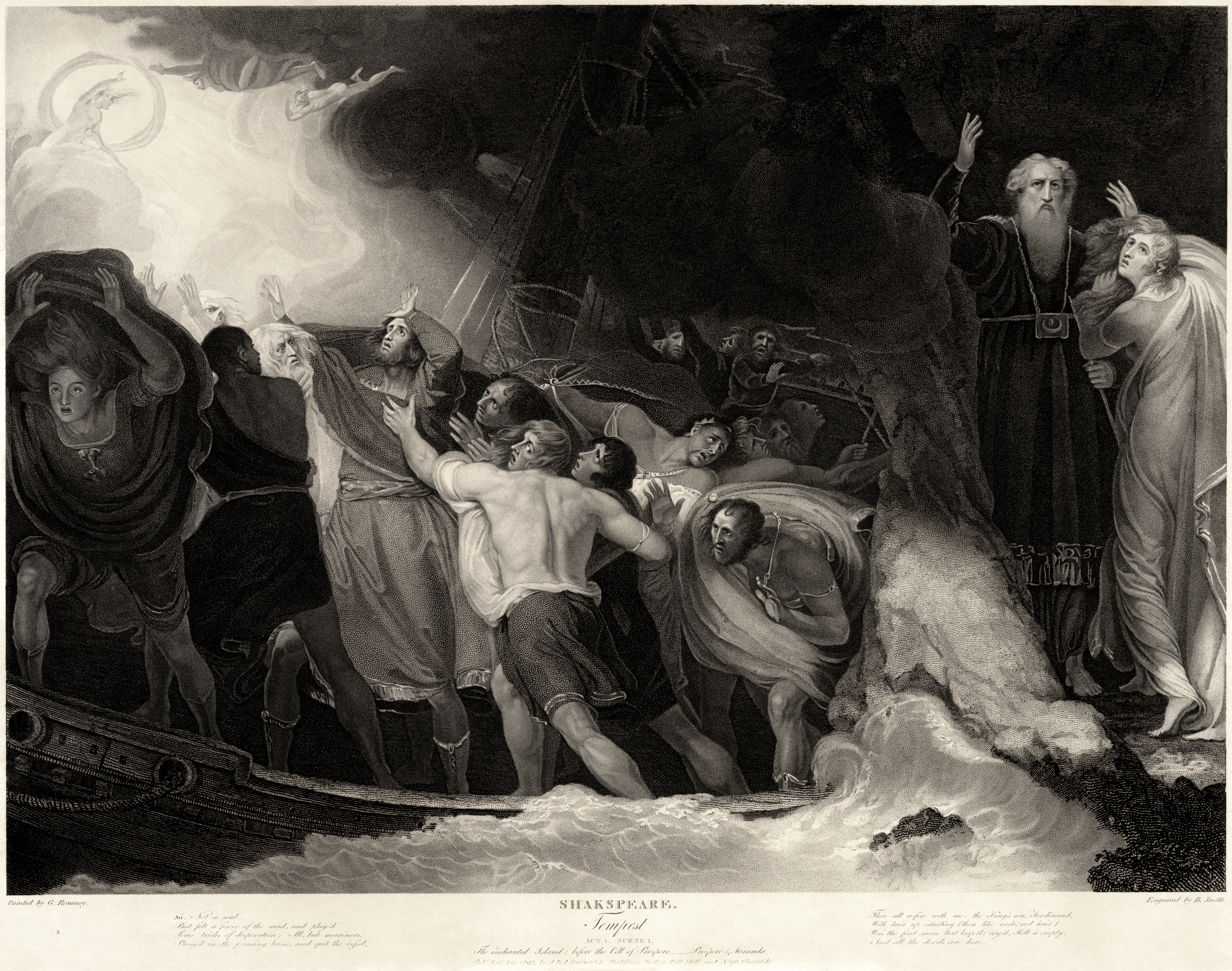
Act I, Scene 1 of The Tempest by William Shakespeare, by Benjamin Smith after George Romney, 1797. British Museum Collection

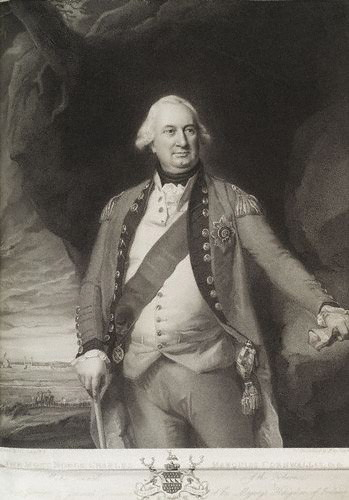
Charles Cornwallis, 1st Marquess Cornwallis, by Benjamin Smith after John Singleton Copley, 1798. National Portrait Gallery.

- Love & Learning or The Oxford Scholar, after Thomas Rowlandson, 1786. British Museum.
- Wm Smith Esqr, Late of the Theatre Royal Drury Lane, after Henry Spicer, 1789. British Museum.
- Marchioness of Salisbury, after Richard Crosse, 1790. Royal Collection.
- William Hogarth and his dog, after William Hogarth, 1794. Metropolitan Museum of Art, National Portrait Gallery, British Museum.
- Sigismunda, after William Hogarth, 1795. Metropolitan Museum of Art, British Museum.
- John Milton and his two daughters (Deborah Milton; Mary Milton; John Milton), after George Romney, 1795. British Museum, National Portrait Gallery.
- Richard II, Act IV, Scene I, after Mather Brown, c.1795. British Museum.
- Paradise Lost: Adam and Eve Banished from Paradise, after design by Richard Westall, 1795.
- The Alto Relievo in the Front of the Shakespeare Gallery, Pall-Mall, after sculptor Thomas Banks, 1796. British Museum.
- The Infant Shakespeare Attended by Nature and the Passions, after design by George Romney 1797. British Museum.
- Act I, Scene 1 of The Tempest by William Shakespeare, after George Romney, 1797. Metropolitan Museum of Art, British Museum.
- Mrs. Chambers, after Henry Spicer, 1788–1799. British Museum.
- The Enchanted Island. The King's Ship, 1797
- Death of a Fair Infant, after design by Richard Westall, 1797.
- Paradise Regained: The Fall of Satan, after design by Richard Westall, 1797.
- Lycidas, after design by Richard Westall, 1797.
- John Pond, after Thomas Parkinson, 1797. National Portrait Gallery.
- Charles Cornwallis, 1st Marquess Cornwallis, after John Singleton Copley, 1798. National Portrait Gallery.
- An Allegory of Providence, after John Francis Rigaud, 1799. British Museum.
- An Allegory of Innocence, after John Francis Rigaud, 1799. Metropolitan Museum of Art, British Museum.
- The resurrection of a pious family from their tomb at the last day, after William Peters, 1786–1804. British Museum.
- The Spirit of A Child Arrived In The Presence Of The Almighty, after William Peters, c1800.
- Lord Mayor Newnham taking the Oaths, 1782 (includes Nathaniel Newnham; John Boydell and numerous other sitters), after William Miller, 1801. British Museum, National Portrait Gallery.
- Mr Barrymore, after Thomas Hardy, 1801. British Museum.
- Portrait of the actress Anne Dibdin, after Thomas Kearsley, 1801. British Museum.
- Charles Dibdin, after Thomas Kearsley, 1801. British Museum, Royal Collection, National Portrait Gallery.
- King Richard Surrendering His Crown, 1801.
- Charles Dibden, after Arthur William Devis, 1803. Royal Collection.
- Shakespeare nursed by Tragedy and Comedy, after George Romney, 1803. British Museum.
- An equestrian portrait of George III, after Sir William Beechey, 1804. British Museum, National Portrait Gallery.
- Capt.n Sir William Fraser, Bar.t, after George Romney, 1806. National Portrait Gallery.
- John Boydell, after Charles Borckhardt, 1806. Royal Collection.
- Mr Bannister as Don Whiskerandoss, after Samuel De Wilde, 1806. British Museum.
- Portrait of Napoleon, after Andrea Appiani, 1810.
- Josiah Robert Harrison, after Joseph Allen, 1800–1830. British Museum.
- Christ healing the sick in the temple, after Benjamin West, 1813. British Museum.
- St Peter’s First Sermon, after Benjamin West 1814. British Museum.
- King George III, after Sir William Beechey, 1820. British Museum, National Portrait Gallery.
- James Caulfeild, 1st Earl of Charlemont, after Horace Hone, 1822. British Museum, National Portrait Gallery.
- Samuel and Eli, after John Singleton Copley, 1824. British Museum.
- HM King George IV, 1824. Royal Collection.
- The Birth of Venus, after James Barry, 1820–1829. British Museum.
- Christ and his Disciples at Emmaus, after Guercino, 1825
- The Favor'd Dove, after François Louis Soinard, 1827
- La surprise, after Claude Marie Dubufe, 1828. British Museum.
- Do you know me?, after Rosalba Giovanni Carriera, 1828. British Museum.
