= Josiah Boydell =

English painter (1752–1817)

Josiah Boydell (18 January 1752 – 27 March 1817) was a British publisher and painter, whose main achievement was the establishment of the Boydell Shakespeare Gallery with his uncle, John Boydell.

== Biography ==
Boydell was born in Hawarden, Flintshire, the fourth child of a farmer, Samuel Boydell (1727–1783), and his wife Ann, née Turner (1725–1764). In 1766, at the age of 14, he moved to London to begin his seven-year apprenticeship to Samuel's brother, John Boydell. While an apprentice, he learned painting from Benjamin West and mezzotint engraving from Richard Earlom.

After completing his apprenticeship, he continued to work closely with John Boydell, making some engravings himself and drawing scenes for others. He also exhibited at the Royal Academy between 1772 and 1779. One of his major early tasks was to draw the picture collection of Sir Robert Walpole at Houghton Hall, Norfolk, prior to the export of the pictures to Catherine the Great of Russia. Boydell worked on this project with Joseph and George Farington. While in Norfolk, he met and (on 6 December 1774) married Jane North, the daughter of Sir Roger North.

Josiah and Jane had several children. One son, John North Boydell, was later involved in the family's publishing company.

== Artistic works ==
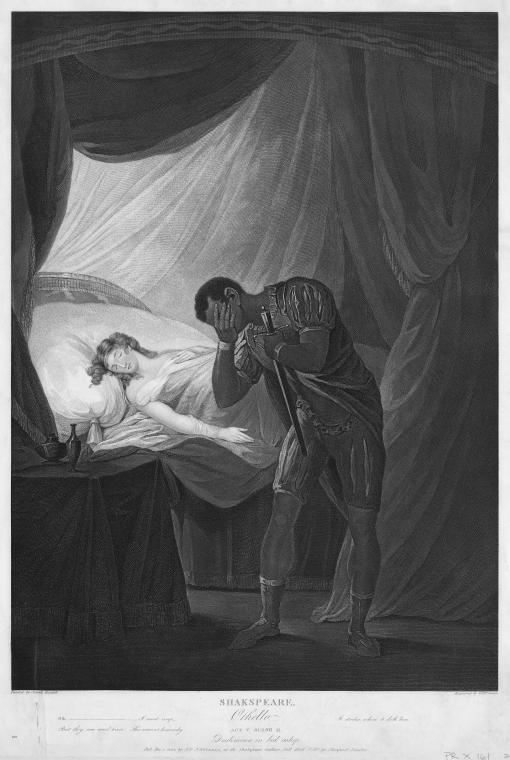
Desdemona Asleep, from Othello (Act V, scene 2), drawn by Josiah Boydell for the Folio published by the Boydell Shakespeare Gallery

This partial list is based largely on Fagan.

=== Paintings ===
- Portrait of Alderman John Boydell (exhibited at the Royal Academy, 1772)
- Portrait of Jane North in the character of Juno (exhibited at the Royal Academy, 1776)
- Portrait of Josiah and Jane Boydell (exhibited at the Royal Academy, 1776)

=== Paintings and drawings for the Shakespeare Gallery ===
For the Folio, Volume II

- Prince Henry Taking the Crown, from Henry IV, Part 2 (Act IV, scene 4)
- Prince Henry’s Apology, from Henry IV, Part 2 (Act IV, scene 4)
- a scene from Henry VI, Part 1 (Act II, scene 4)
- a scene from Henry VI, Part 3 (Act II, scene 5)
- Desdemona Asleep from Othello (Act V, scene 2)

For the Illustrated Edition, Volume VI

- Henry VI, Part 1 (Act II, scene 4)

For the Illustrated Edition, Volume IX

- Desdemona Asleep, from Othello (Act V, scene 2)

=== Engravings ===
- frontispiece to Liber Veritatis (25 March 1777, a self-portrait by Claude Lorrain)
- Charles I (1778, after Van Dyck)
- Jane Wenman (1779, after Van Dyck)

== Bibliography ==
- Fagan, L. A., rev. Vivienne W. Painting. "Josiah Boydell (1752–1817)". Oxford Dictionary of National Biography. Oxford University Press. 2004. Retrieved on 17 January 2008. ISBN 0-19-861411-X.
