= Burnet Reading =

English engraver and draughtsman

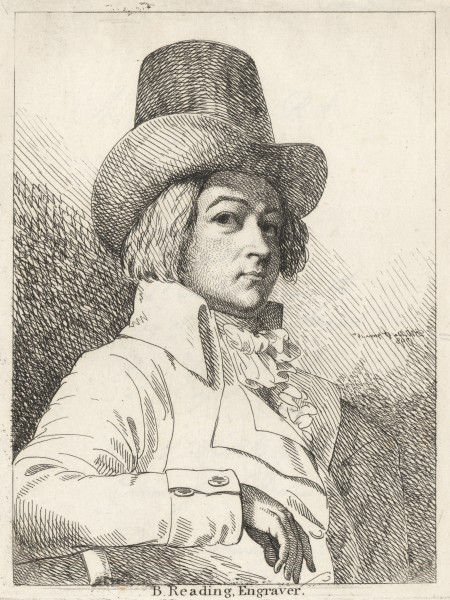
Burnet Reading by Samuel De Wilde, 1798.

Burnet Reading (1749–1838) was an English engraver and draughtsman.

== Biography ==
Reading was a native of Colchester, and practised in London. He worked entirely for the booksellers, engraving chiefly portraits of contemporary celebrities, many of which appeared in Bell's "British Theatre," 1776–86, and the "European Magazine," 1783–93. Reading engraved a set of six portraits of members of the Royal Academy, from drawings by Peter Falconet and another of members of the American Congress, 1783; also some of the plates to Boydell's "Shakespeare," and a few fancy subjects, such as "Lavinia and her Mother," after W. Bigg, and "Charlotte at the Tomb of Werther," from his own design. In 1820 a set of twelve etchings by Reading, from drawings by Mortimer, of "Characters to illustrate Shakespeare," was published by T. and H. Rodd; and many of the plates in that firm's "Collection of Portraits to illustrate Granger's “History of England,”" 1820 and 1822, were engraved by him. He was employed as drawing and riding master by the Earl of Pomfret at Windsor. A portrait of Reading was etched by Samuel De Wilde in 1798.

== Gallery ==
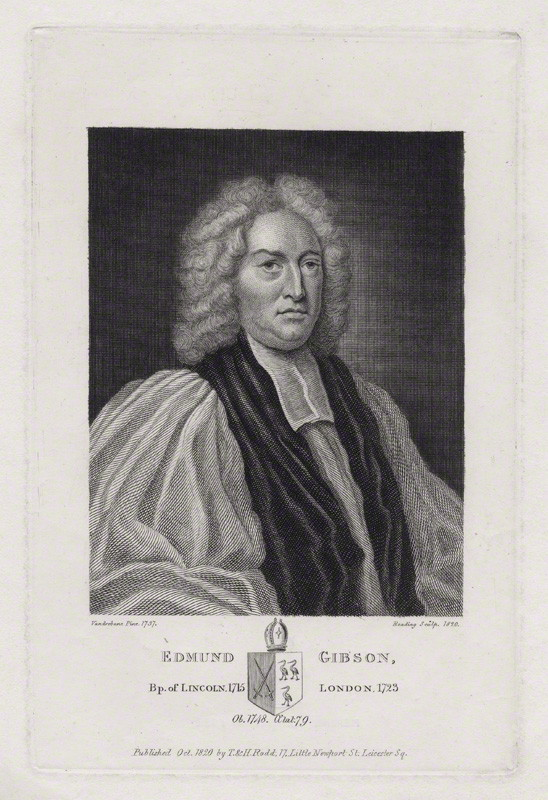

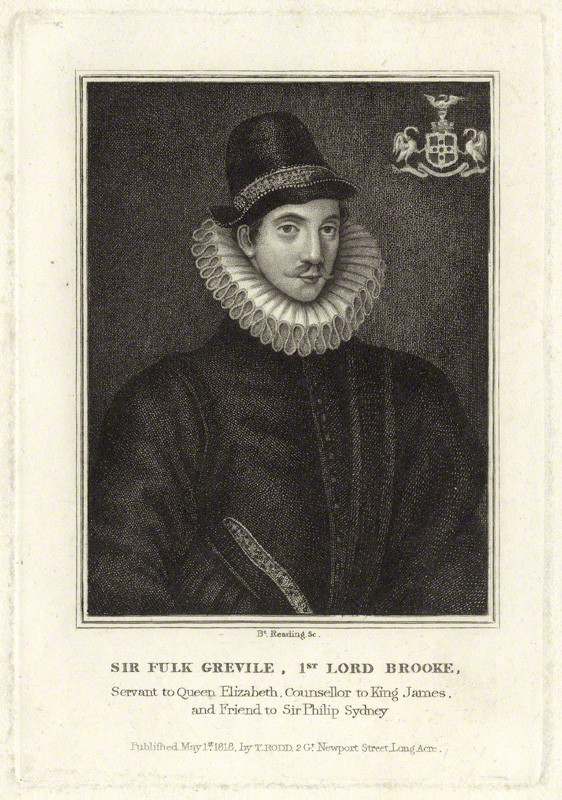

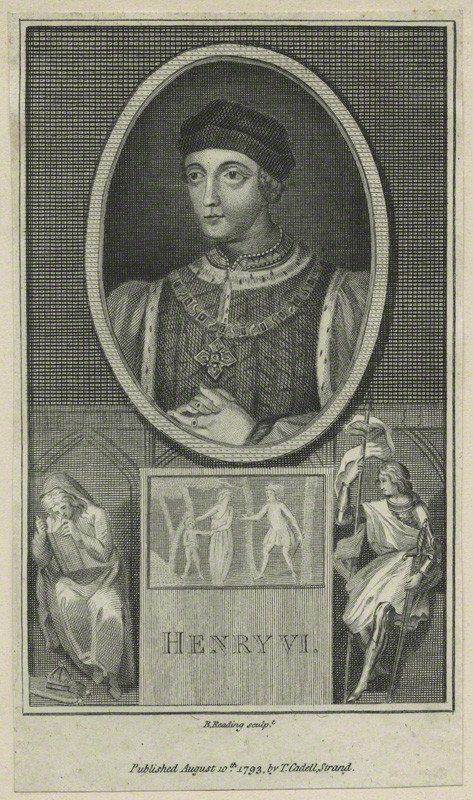

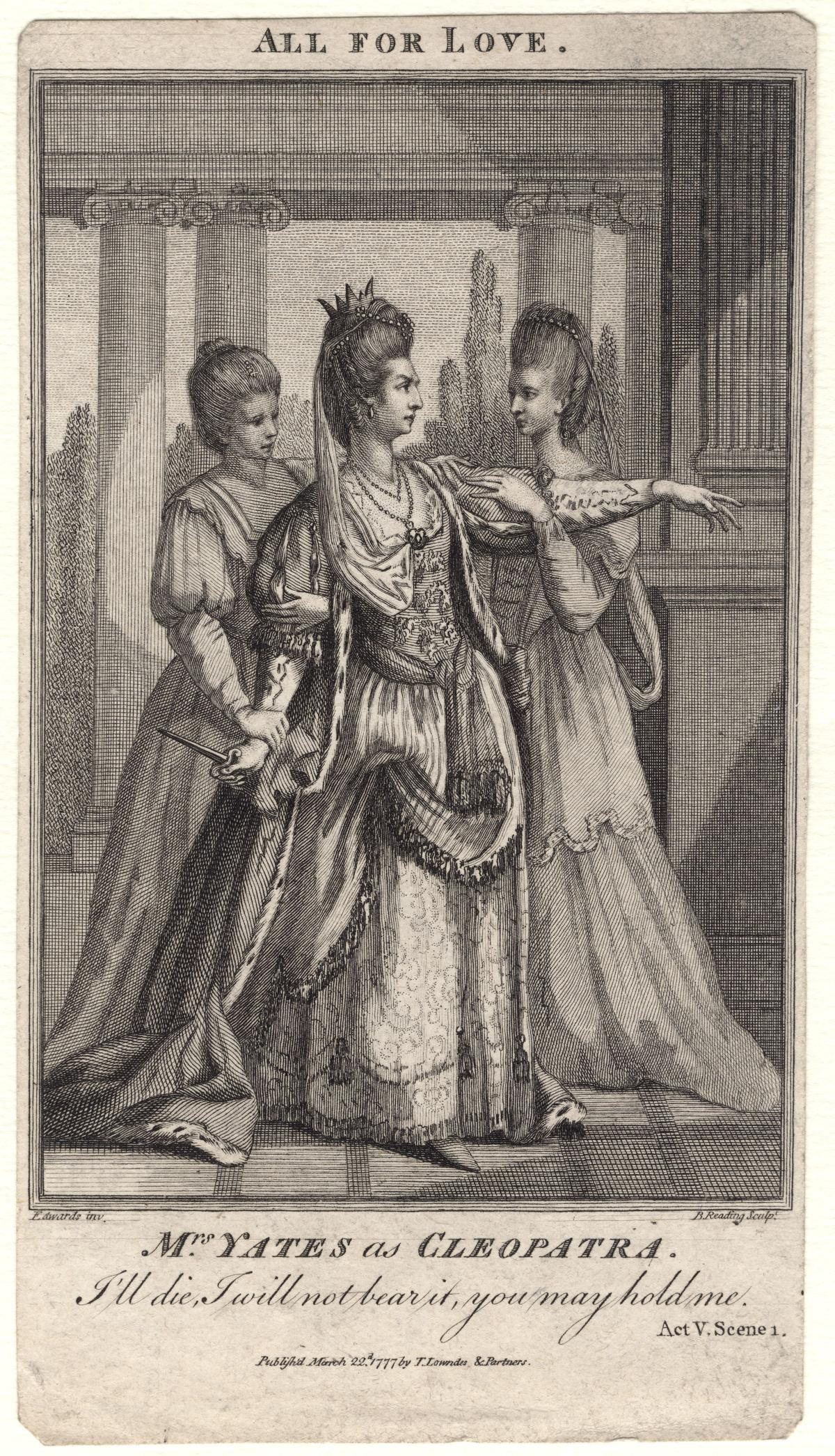

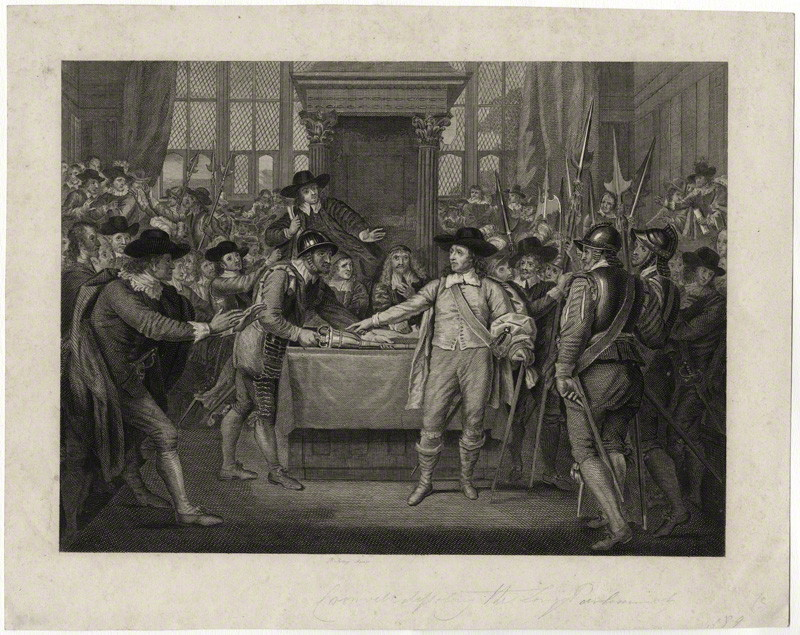
