= Thomas Banks (sculptor) =

English sculptor (1735–1805)

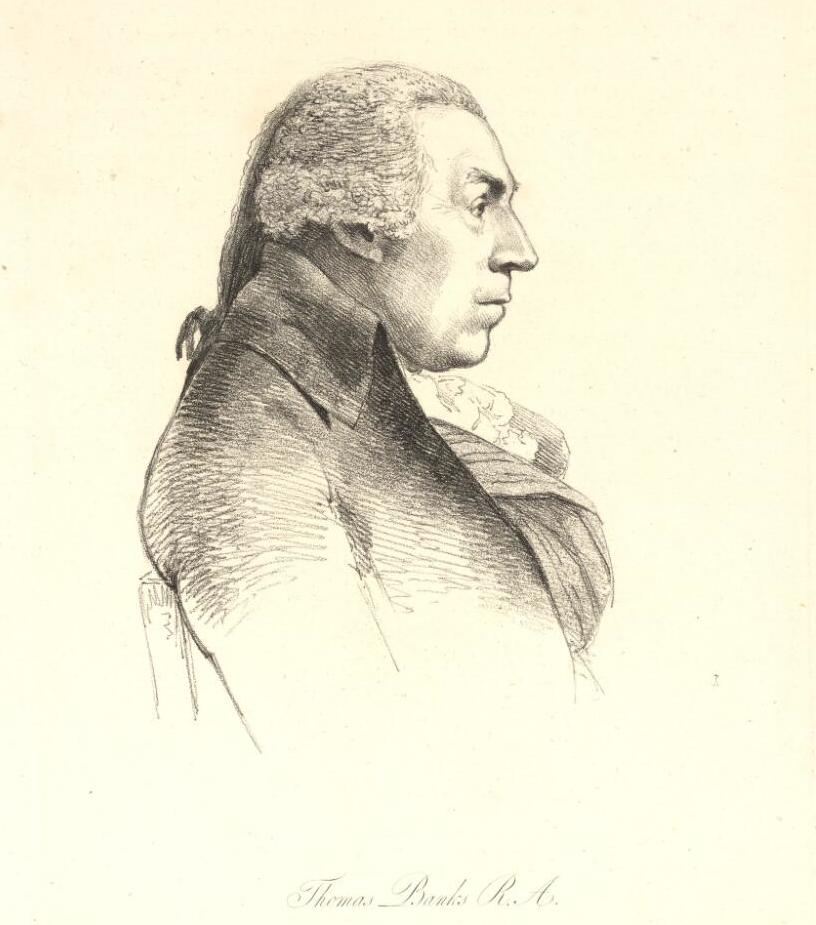
- Engraved portrait of Banks by William Daniell (1809)
- Born: 29 December 1735; London, England
- Died: 2 February 1805 (aged 69); London, England
- Known for: Sculpture

Thomas Banks (29 December 1735 – 2 February 1805) was an 18th-century English sculptor.

== Life ==
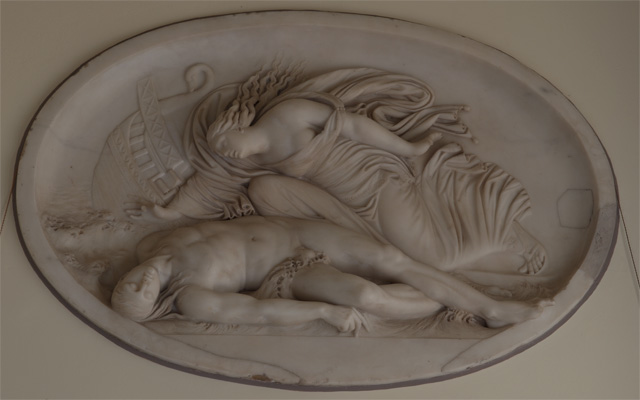
Alcyone and Ceyx marble bas relief, originally at Parlington Hall, Aberford; removed to Lotherton Hall sometime after 1905.

The son of William Banks, a surveyor who was land steward to the Duke of Beaufort, he was born in London. He was educated at Ross-on-Wye. Banks was taught drawing by his father, and from 1750 to 1756 was apprenticed to a woodcarver, William Barlow, in London. In his spare time he worked at sculpture, spending his evenings in the studio of the Flemish émigré sculptor Peter Scheemakers. During this period he is known to have worked for the architect William Kent. Before 1772, when he obtained a travelling studentship given by the Royal Academy and proceeded to Rome, he had already exhibited several fine works.

Returning to England in 1779 Banks found that the taste for classical poetry, long the source of his inspiration, no longer existed, and he spent two years in Saint Petersburg, being employed by Catherine the Great, who purchased his Cupid Tormenting a Butterfly. On his return to England he modelled his colossal Achilles Mourning the Loss of Briseis, a work full of force and passion. He was elected, in 1784, an associate of the Royal Academy and in the following year became a full member.

Banks died in London on 2 February 1805. He is buried in the churchyard of St Mary on Paddington Green Church. A plaque to his memory was also erected in Westminster Abbey.

== Works ==
Among other works in St Paul's Cathedral by Banks are the monuments to Captain George Blagden Westcott and Captain Richard Rundle Burges, and in Westminster Abbey to Sir Eyre Coote, General Loten, Sir Clifton Wintringham and William Woollett. His bronze bust of Warren Hastings is in the National Portrait Gallery.

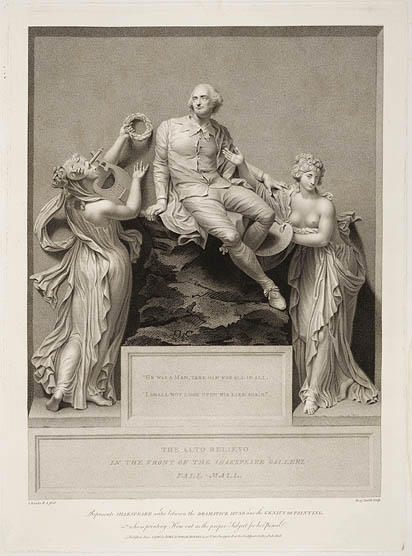
Engraving by Benjamin Smith of Banks's sculpture Shakespeare attended by Painting and Poetry, formerly at the entrance to the Boydell Shakespeare Gallery

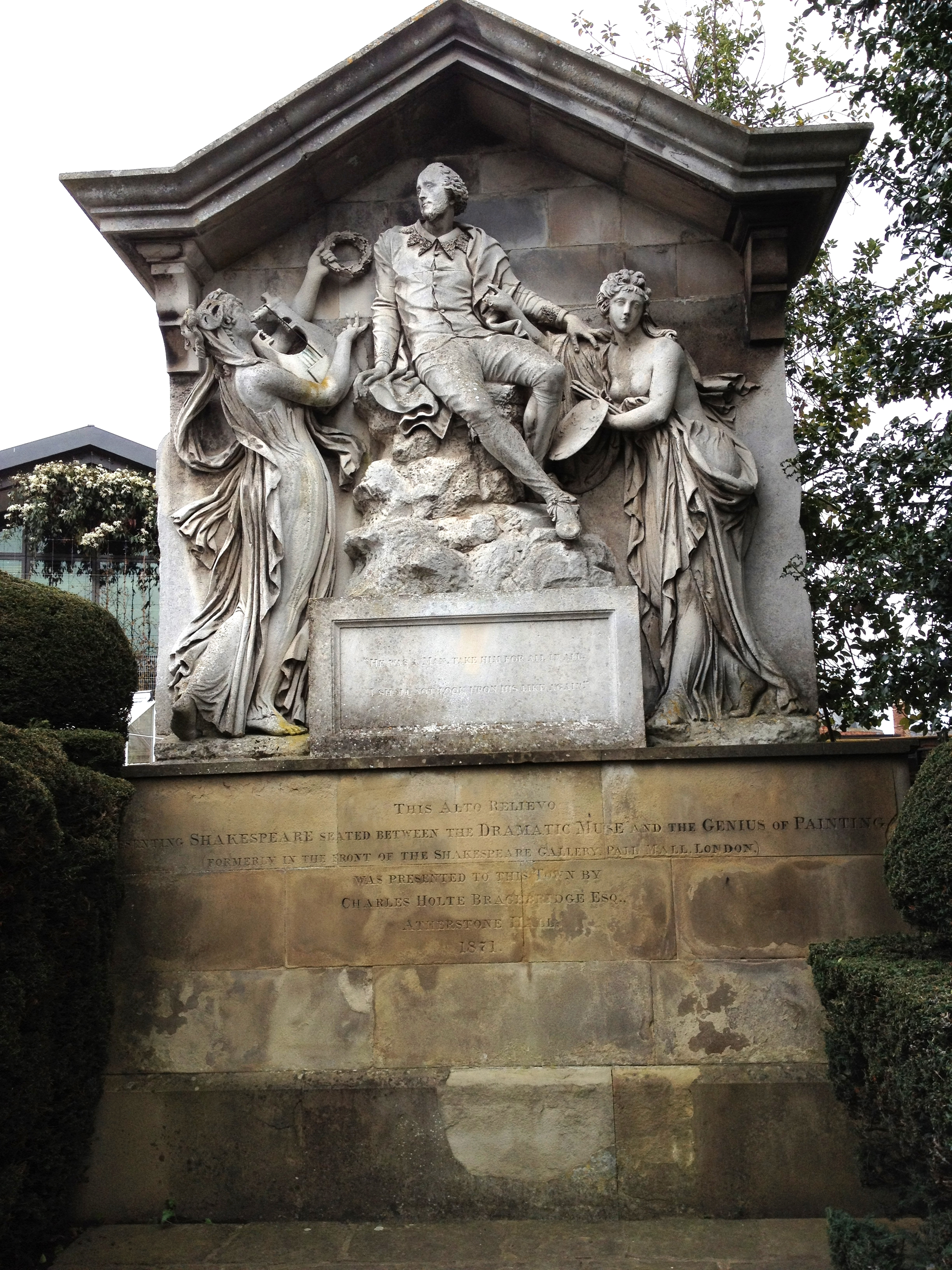
Shakespeare attended by Poetry and Painting

Banks's best-known work is perhaps the colossal group of Shakespeare Attended by Painting and Poetry, which since 1871 has been placed in the garden of New Place, Stratford-upon-Avon. The high-relief sculpture was completed in 1789 for a recess in the upper façade of John Boydell's new Shakespeare Gallery in Pall Mall. Banks was paid 500 guineas for the group which depicts Shakespeare, reclining against a rock, between the Dramatic Muse and the Genius of Painting. Beneath it was panelled pedestal inscribed "He was a Man, take him for all in all, I shall not look upon his like again". The sculpture remained in Pall Mall until the building was demolished in 1868 or 1869, when it was moved to New Place.

One of his most bizarre works is the 1801 Anatomical Crucifixion, a dissected body nailed to a cross, in the Hunterian Museum in London.

== Selected public works ==
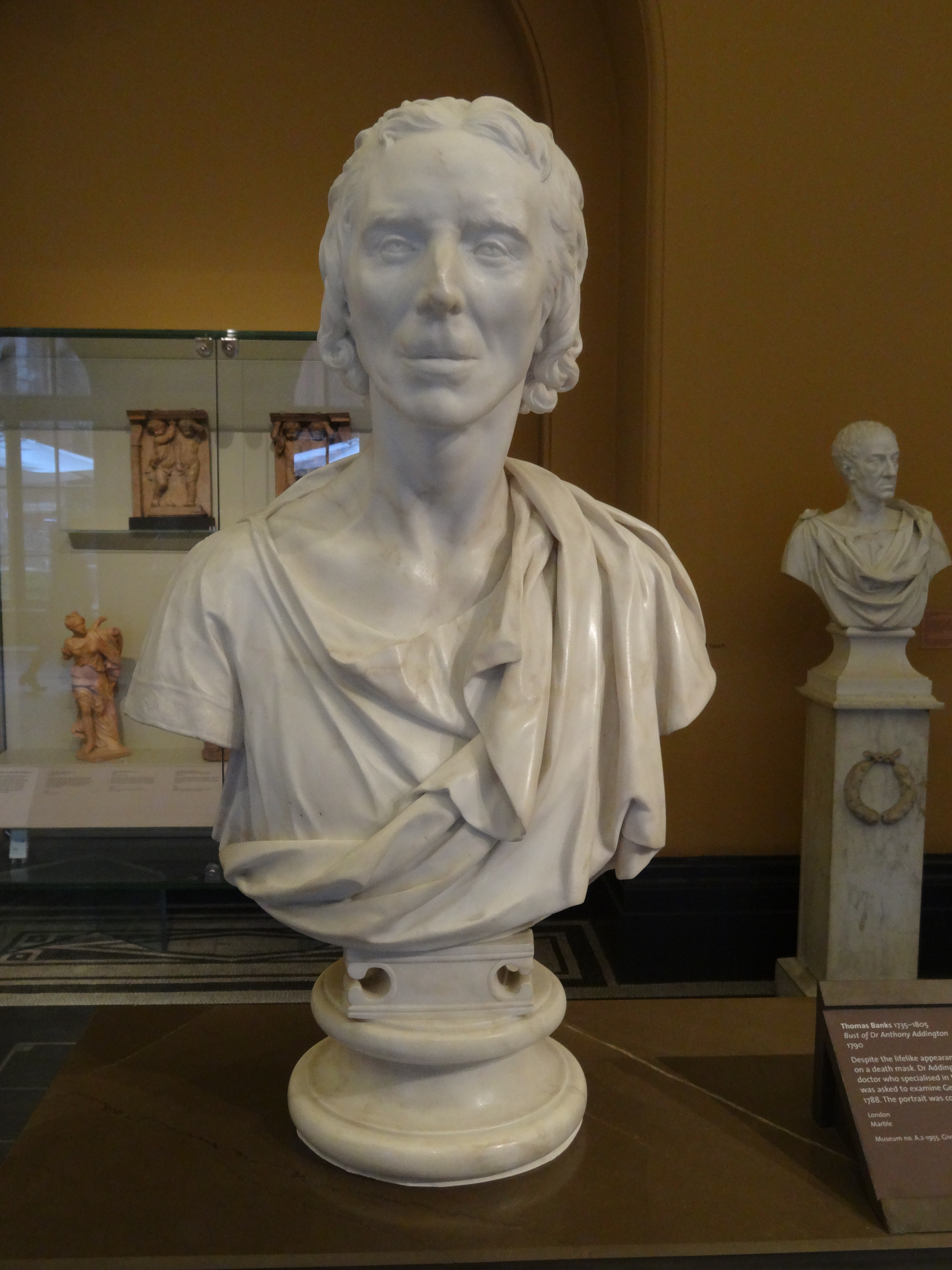
Dr Anthony Addington by Thomas Banks, 1790, Victoria and Albert Museum

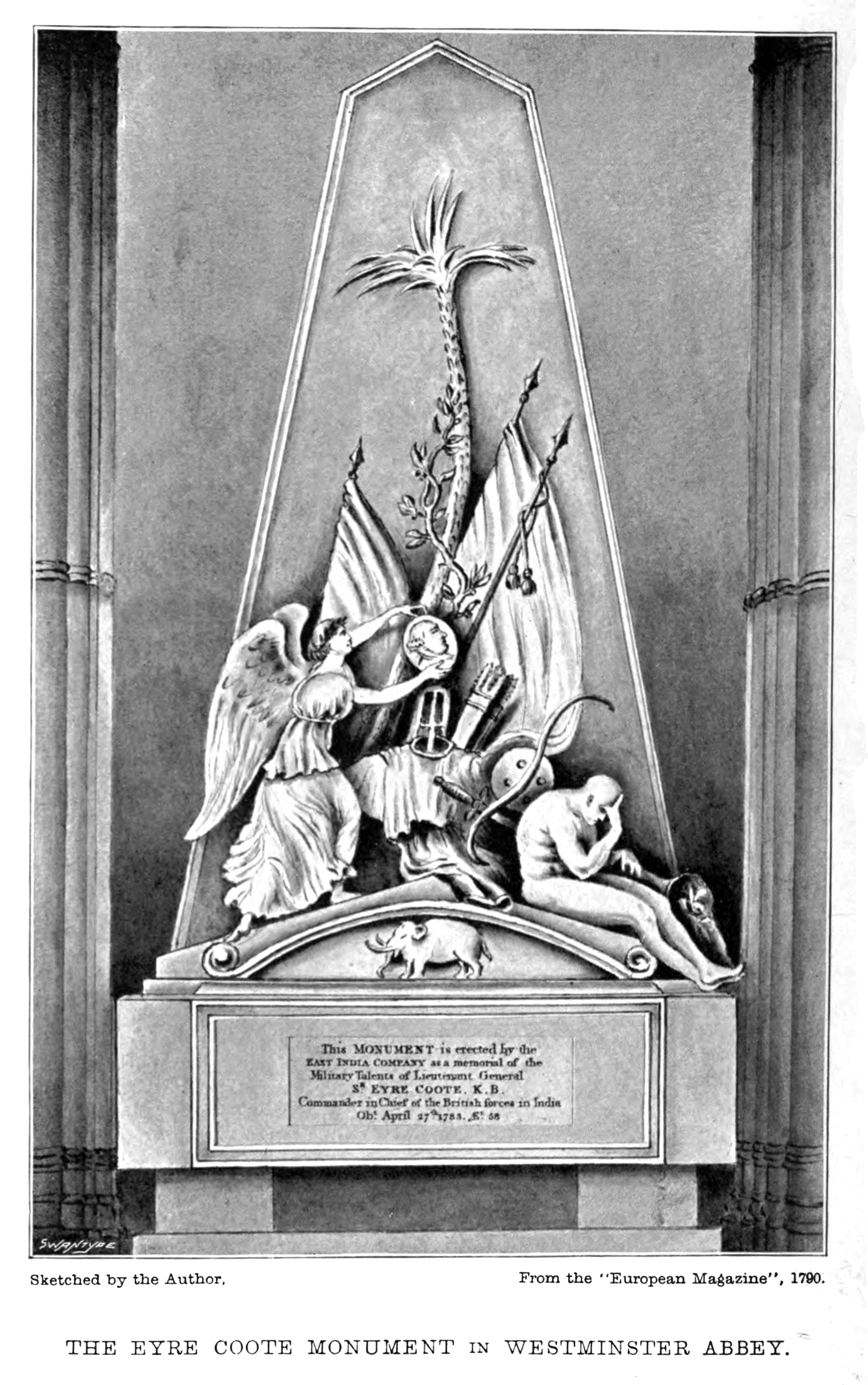
Eyre Coote Memorial at Westminster Abbey by Thomas Banks

Public works by Banks include

- Isaac Watts, Westminster Abbey (1774)
- Bishop Thomas Newton, St. Mary-le-Bow (1782)
- Sir Eyre Coote, Westminster Abbey (1783)
- Dean Smith, Chester Cathedral (1787)
- John Heaviside the elder, Hatfield, Hertfordshire (1787)
- Bishop Edmund Law, Carlisle Cathedral (1787)
- Robert Markham, St Mary's, Whitechapel, London (1788)
- Giuseppe Baretti, Marylebone Chapel (1789)
- Philip Yorke, 2nd Earl of Hardwicke, Flitton, Bedfordshire (1790)
- Samuel Northcote, St Andrew's, Plymouth (1791)
- William Woollett, Westminster Abbey (1791)
- Shukburgh Ashby, Hungarton, Leicestershire (1792)
- Tomb of Penelope Boothby, Ashbourne, Derby (1791)
- Joseph Hurlock FRS, Stoke Newington Parish Church (1793)
- Anna Matthews, Chester Cathedral (1793)
- Joan Gideon Loten, Westminster Abbey (1793)
- Sir Clifton Wintringham, Westminster Abbey (1794)
- Mrs Halifax, Ewell, Surrey (1795)
- Margaret Petrie, Lewisham Parish Church (1795)
- Stephen Storace, Marylebone Parish Church (1796)
- Colonel Thomas Kyd, memorial in Calcutta Botanical Gardens, India (1796)
- Cornelia Millbank, Croft, Yorkshire (1796)
- John Halliday, Halesowen, Worcestershire (1797)
- John Clarke, Ickenham, Middlesex, (1800)
- Captain Richard Burgess, St Paul's Cathedral (1802)
- Captain George Blagden Westcott, St Paul's Cathedral (1805)
- Caractacus Pleading Before the Emperior Claudius in Rome, relief panel, 1774-1777, Stowe School
- Thetis and her Nymphs Coming to Console Achilles for the Death of Patroclus, relief panel, Victoria and Albert Museum, London
