= William Ellis (engraver) =

British engraver and oil painter

William Ellis (1747–1810) was an English engraver and oil painter.

== Life ==
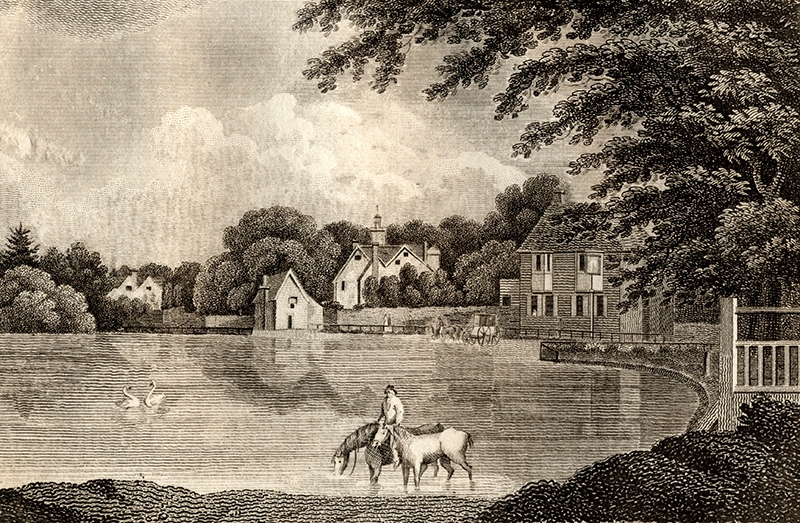
A view of Carshalton (now in the London Borough of Sutton), engraved by William Ellis for Hughson's Description of London (1806)

Ellis was born in London in 1747, the son of a writing engraver. He was placed as a pupil with William Woollett. He produced some fine plates in the style of his teacher, some being executed in conjunction with him, including the two portraits of Rubens and his wife, published in 1774; A River Scene with a Windmill, after Salomon Ruysdael, published in 1777; Solitude, after Richard Wilson, published in 1778; and two scenes from the Vicar of Wakefield, after Thomas Hearne, published in 1780, and exhibited at the Society of Artists in that year.

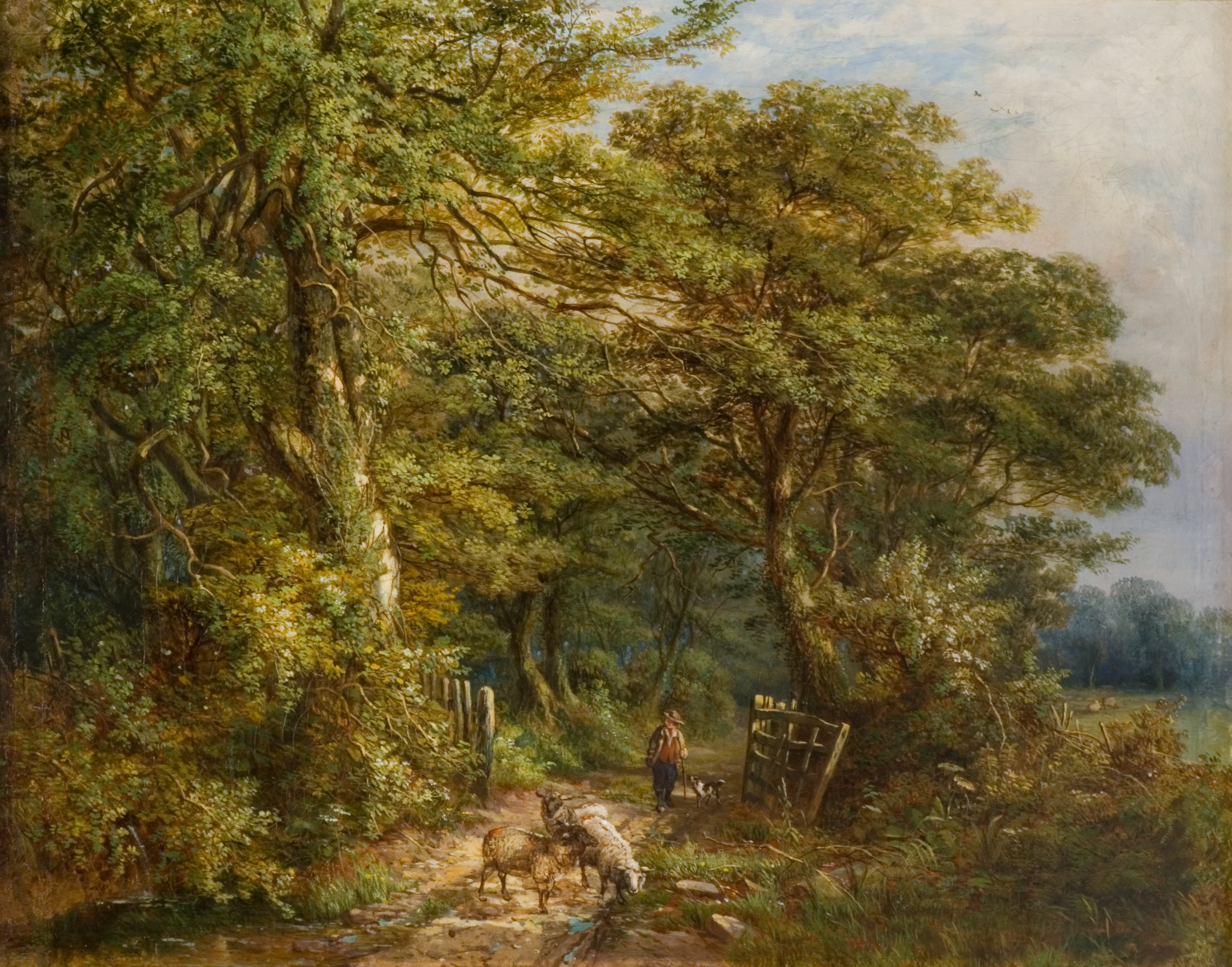
An oil painting by Ellis of A Lane at Hamstead, Staffordshire.

Ellis engraved several topographical views after Paul Sandby and Thomas Hearne, a set of The Seasons after Hearne, and some plates for the Ladies' Magazine. In 1800 he aquatinted a set of engravings of Views of the Memorable Victory of the Nile engraved by Francis Chesham from paintings by William Anderson. In 1785, he married Elizabeth Smith, also an etcher. Some of his engravings, such as Peasants Dancing after Berchem, are signed "William and Elizabeth Ellis", and a plate of The Solitary Traveller after J. Pye, is stated to be etched by Elizabeth Ellis alone. Between 1783 and 1793 he lived at 9 Gwynne's Buildings, Islington.

Ellis died in 1810, as is shown from the inscription on a plate representing A South View of the City of Exeter, from a Drawing taken at Shooting Marsh by the late Mr, William Ellis, published 24 November 1810, in aid of his five orphan children. In 1814 a set of Twenty-nine Views illustrative of the Rev. Daniel Lysons's Environs of London, drawn and engraved by William Ellis was published .
