= Edward Rooker =

English engraver, draughtsman and actor

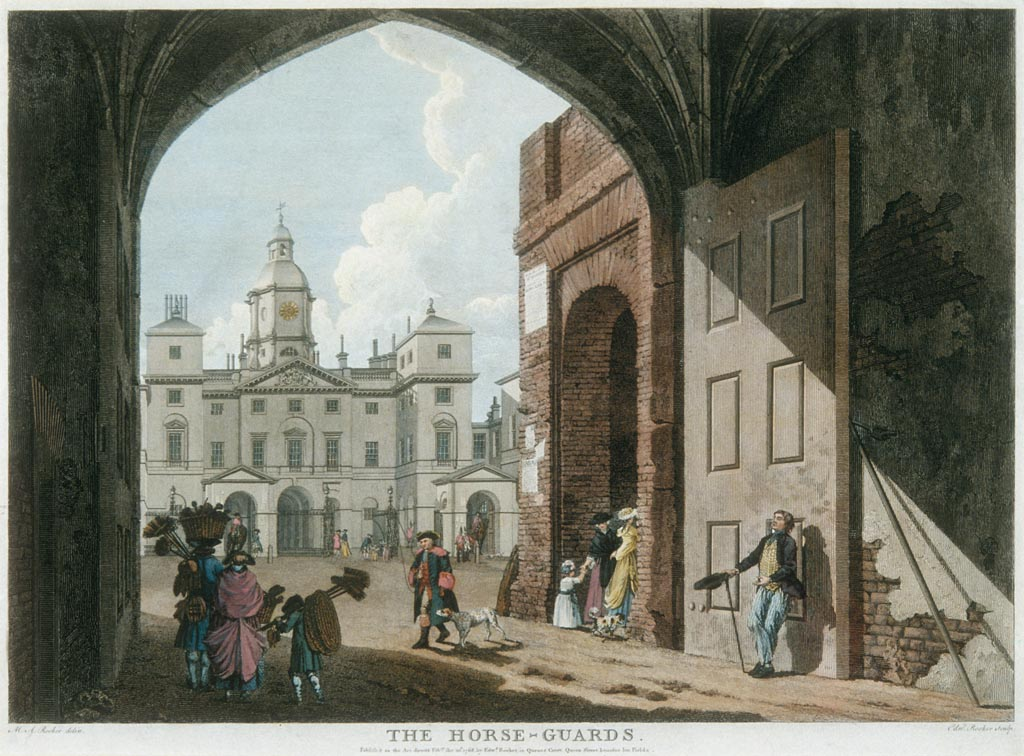
The Horseguards (1768 engraving by Rooker after his son M A Rooker)

Edward Rooker (c. 1712 – 22 November 1774) was an English engraver, draughtsman and actor.

== Life and work ==
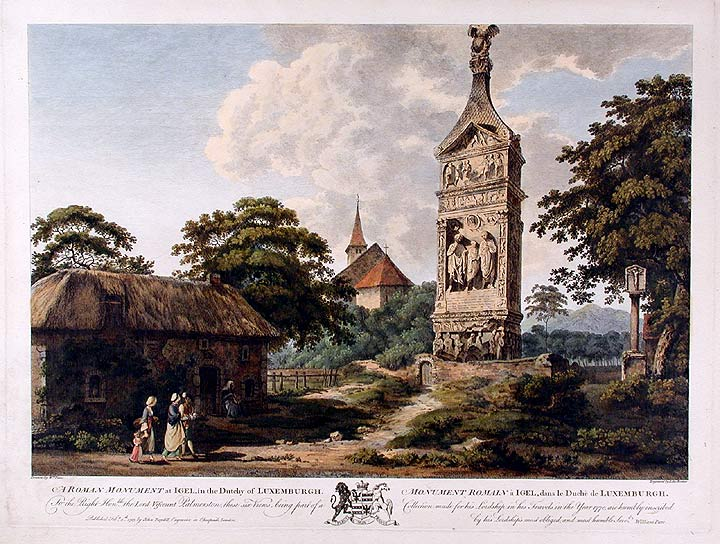
A Roman Monument at Igel (engraving by J. Boydell after E. Rooker - based on a painting by William Pars)

Rooker was born in Towcester in Northamptonshire around 1712, to Michael and Ann Rooker, and was a pupil of Henry Roberts, a landscape engraver. He became celebrated for his architectural plates, which he executed in an extremely rich and artistic style. Art historian Horace Walpole termed him the "Marc Antonio" of architecture.

Among Rooker's early works are a view on the Thames from Somerset House (1750), and a view of Vauxhall Gardens (1751), both after Canaletto; a view of the Parthenon for Dalton's 'Views of Sicily and Greece' (1751), and a section of St. Paul's Cathedral, decorated according to the original intention of Sir Christopher Wren, from a drawing by J. Gwyn and S. Wale (1755).

Rooker also contributed plates to Sir William Chambers' 'Civil Architecture' (1759) and 'Kew Gardens' (1763), James Stuart's 'The Antiquities of Athens and Other Monuments of Greece' (1762), and Robert Adam's 'Ruins of the Palace of Diocletian at Spalatro' (1764).

Another of Rooker's works is a set of six views of London, engraved in the manner of Piranesi from drawings by Paul and Thomas Sandby, which he published himself in 1766. In that year he also drew and engraved a large view of Blackfriars Bridge, then in course of construction. He engraved many landscapes after William Pars, Paul Sandby, Richard Wilson, and others. He also etched, in conjunction with Sandby, three of the set of six large plates of subjects from Tasso's "Gerusalemme Liberata" (painted by John Collins [c. 1725 - c. 1759]).

The headings of the 'Oxford Almanacks' from 1769 to 1775 were all the joint work of Edward and his son Michael. Rooker was an original member of the Incorporated Society of Artists, and exhibited with them from 1760 to 1768. His last work was done for the 'Copper Plate Magazine', forming a series of landscapes and portraits, which began to appear a few months before his death.

Rooker was also an actor, working at the Drury Lane Theatre in London between 1752 and 1774, often playing the role of the harlequin.

Edward Rooker died on 22 November 1774 at his house in Great Russell Street in Bloomsbury. His son Michael Angelo Rooker was a notable artist and engraver. Another son Edward Rooker Jr. was also an engraver.
