= William Shipley =

English inventor (1715–1803)

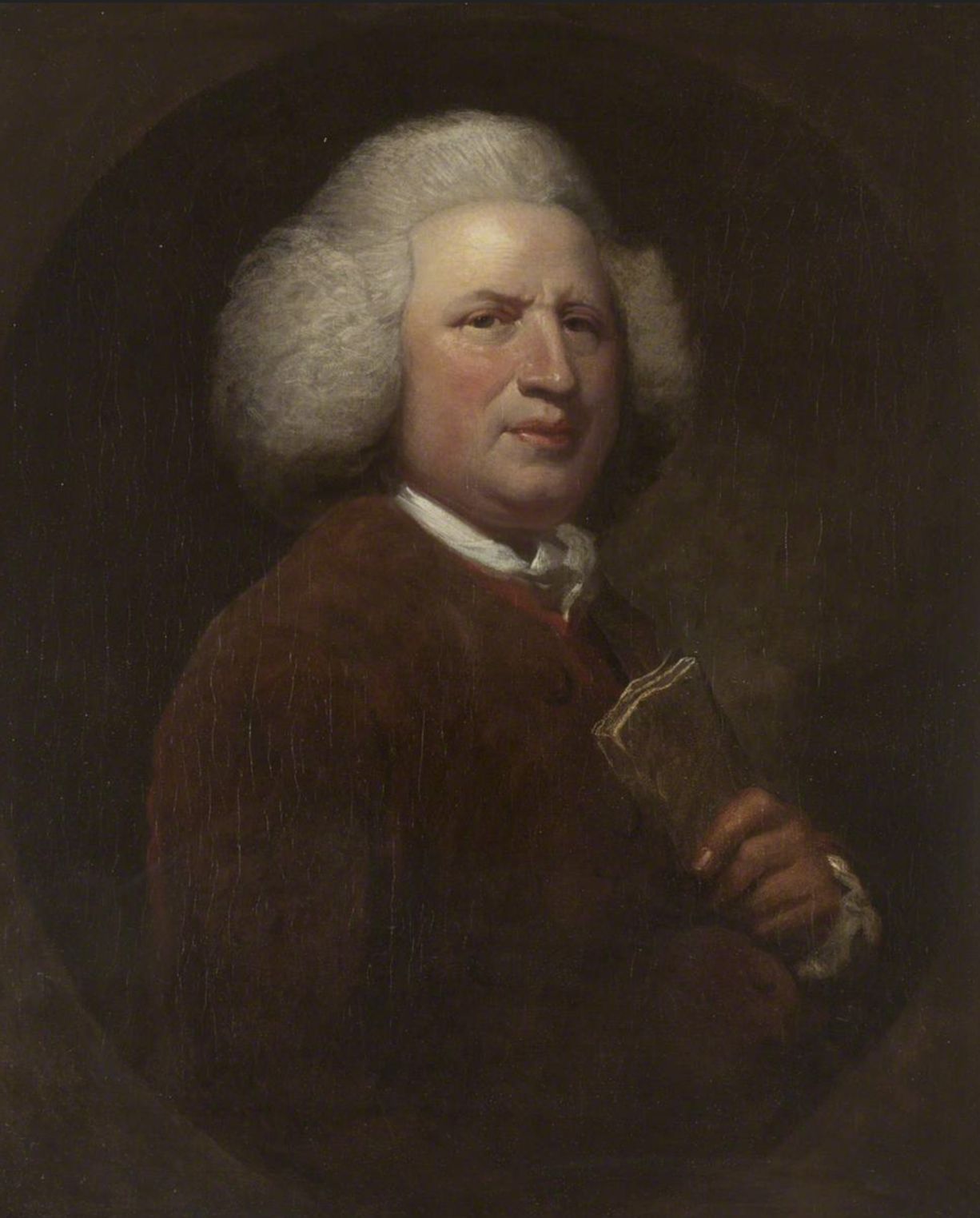
William Shipley by Richard Cosway.

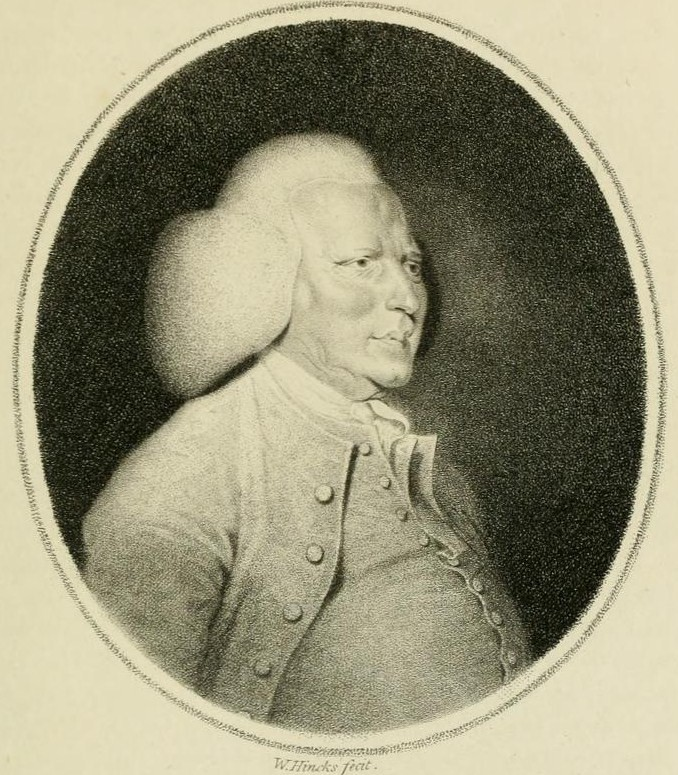
Engraved portrait of William Shipley (William Hincks, late 18c.).

William Shipley FRSA (baptised: 2 June 1715 – 28 December 1803) was an English drawing master, social reformer and inventor who, in 1754, founded an arts society in London that became The Royal Society of Arts, or Royal Society for the Encouragement of Arts, Manufactures & Commerce (RSA).

== Life ==
=== Early years, training and career ===
Shipley was born in Maidstone, Kent, the son of Jonathan Shipley (d. 1749, originally of Walbrook, London) and Martha (née Davies), and baptised on 2 June 1715. He had a brother Jonathan Shipley, who became the Bishop of St Asaph, and whose son William Davies Shipley became Dean of St Asaph. William grew up in the City of London. His father died when he was just three years old, and William was sent to live with his maternal grandfather. At the age of 21, he inherited £500 and used that money to practice as a painter and drawing master in Northampton. At this point, he also joined the Northampton Philosophical Society, where he began his philanthropic life by raising funds to buy fuel for the poor.

Around 1750, Shipley moved to London and set up a drawing-school near Fountain Court in The Strand (at the east corner of Beaufort Buildings), which was known first as "Shipley's Academy" and later as "Ackermann's Repository of Arts". The school proved highly successful, and among Shipley's pupils were Richard Cosway, Thomas Jones, William Pars, and Francis Wheatley. Although Shipley had many students who went on to become famous artists, he himself was not remembered for his artwork.

=== The Society of Arts ===
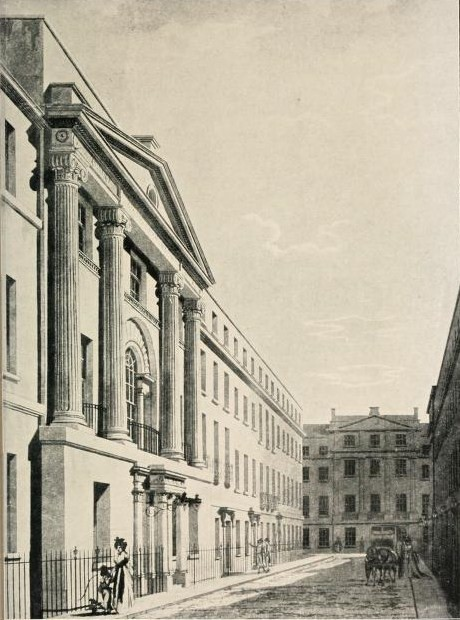
The Society of Arts premises at 18 John Street, Adelphi, London (18c. engraving).

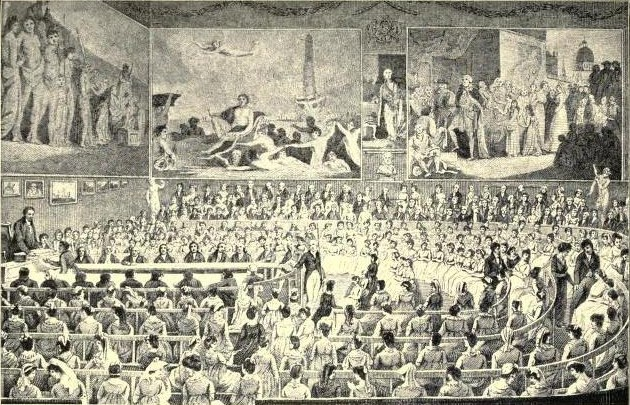
The Society of Arts distributing its awards (engraving – artist unknown).

From Shipley's school, came the idea for a "Society for the Encouragement of Arts, Manufactures, and Commerce" He published his proposals for the society in 1753, which he hoped would make Great Britain a center for intellectual advancements in the areas of arts and sciences. The resulting organisation first met at Rawthmell's coffee house on the north side of Henrietta Street, in Covent Garden on 22 March 1754. Founding members included Viscount Folkestone, Lord Romney (1712–1794), Isaac Maddox, Stephen Hales, and Thomas Baker, the naturalist. A "plan" of Shipley's devising was published in 1755 in folio, where the aims of the society were stated, "to promote the arts, manufactures, and commerce of this kingdom by giving honorary or pecuniary rewards, as may be best adapted to the case, for the communication to the society, and through the society to the public, of all such useful inventions, discoveries, and improvements as tend to that purpose".

Historian Pierre-Nicolas Chantreau (1741–1808) was said to marvel "that such an institution was founded, not by those who held reins of government, but by William Shipley, "cultivateur modeste" The society would award premiums for different discoveries and inventions: "There appeared in the daily and evening papers a notice announcing premiums or awards" They offered premiums for the discovery of cobalt and the raising and curing of madder, for example. These were not just frivolous concerns but matters of Britain's most important industry, namely, textiles. According to Colley, "Cobalt dyes a brilliant blue and the madder was the principal source of all red dies until the 19th century". Quite simply, the society wanted to enable Britain's most important industry, its textile manufacturers, to be able to dye their cloth at home rather than send it abroad."

Colley goes on to say that the Society was also busy trying to solve the problem of finding enough native timber for the building of ships. This was a matter of Britain's national defence. Without timber, the Royal Navy could not build ships.The Society carried out this purpose by establishing prizes for the growing of trees, such as Oaks, chestnuts, Elms and Firs. They once offered a premium to anyone able to develop a scheme to transport breadfruit from the East to the West Indies. Shipley raised the money for the endeavour through subscriptions. He also encouraged people to make new and more accurate maps by awarding special prizes to encourage exploration. Shipley's contributions to both England's economy and England's security through the Society were substantial.

=== The inventor, and later years ===
Shipley was elected a "perpetual member" of the society in February 1755, and was presented with a gold medal by the society in 1758. But it is probable that he became less interested in the society as its sphere gradually became more technical and industrial; At any rate, he resigned his post as registrar in 1760. On 23 November 1767, William Shipley married Elizabeth Miller, and seems to have retired to Maidstone about 1768. The couple's first child was born in 1769 but died after two months. In 1771, The second child, Elizabeth was born. Shipley, under the auspices of Lord Romney, founded a local institution, "The Kentish Society for the Promotion of Useful Knowledge", along the lines of the Society of Arts. In 1783 the society was instrumental in improving the sanitation of Maidstone gaol, and so preventing the "gaol fever", which had ravaged the prison population of the country.

Shipley was an inventor in his own right. He came up with ideas on how to provide inexpensive fuel for the poor, a floating light to save those lost in the sea (for which he received an award), a way to establish new species of fish in ponds around England, and perhaps strangest of all, a method of lining your shoes with tinfoil to keep them dry.

Shipley died in Maidstone, aged 89, on 28 December 1803. A monument was erected to his memory in the north-west corner of churchyard of All Saints Church, Maidstone. Richard Cosway painted an oil portrait of Shipley, and there is also a portrait, drawn and engraved by William Hincks, in the National Portrait Gallery. There is a mezzotint by John Faber the Younger of a painting by Shipley of a man blowing a lighted torch.

== Legacy ==
Shipley's historical significance was summed up by David Allen in his biography: "Shipley's life included in its span the surge of English Commercial self-confidence which Defoe celebrated and which was to be feared by Napoleon, the spectacular first stage of the industrial Revolution from the flying shuttle to steam-powered cotton mills, the flowering of English genius in the arts from Hogarth to Turner, and the growth of English philanthropic endeavor from the first county hospitals to Hannah More's "Age if Benevolence." In the shaping of these momentous developments Shipley which was both distinctive and significant.

Many credit Shipley with helping to establish the role of private organisations to serve the public; the Crown of England was so preoccupied with war and money dealings, it had little resources to further enhance culture at the time. "Merely by existing, the society challenged the way that the British state was organised. To begin with, by taking on certain tasks, they underlined just how much the state left undone.

The William Shipley Group for RSA History is named after him.

== Students of Shipley's Art school ==
- William Hodges
- Francis Wheatley
- Richard Cosway
- William Pars
- Thomas Jones

== Fellows of RSA with Shipley ==
- Samuel Johnson
- Benjamin Franklin
- Jonas Hanway
- William Hogarth
- Thomas Hollis
