= Francis Chesham =

English engraver (1749–1806)

Francis Chesham (1749–1806) was an English engraver, known particularly for his engravings of landscapes.

== Career ==
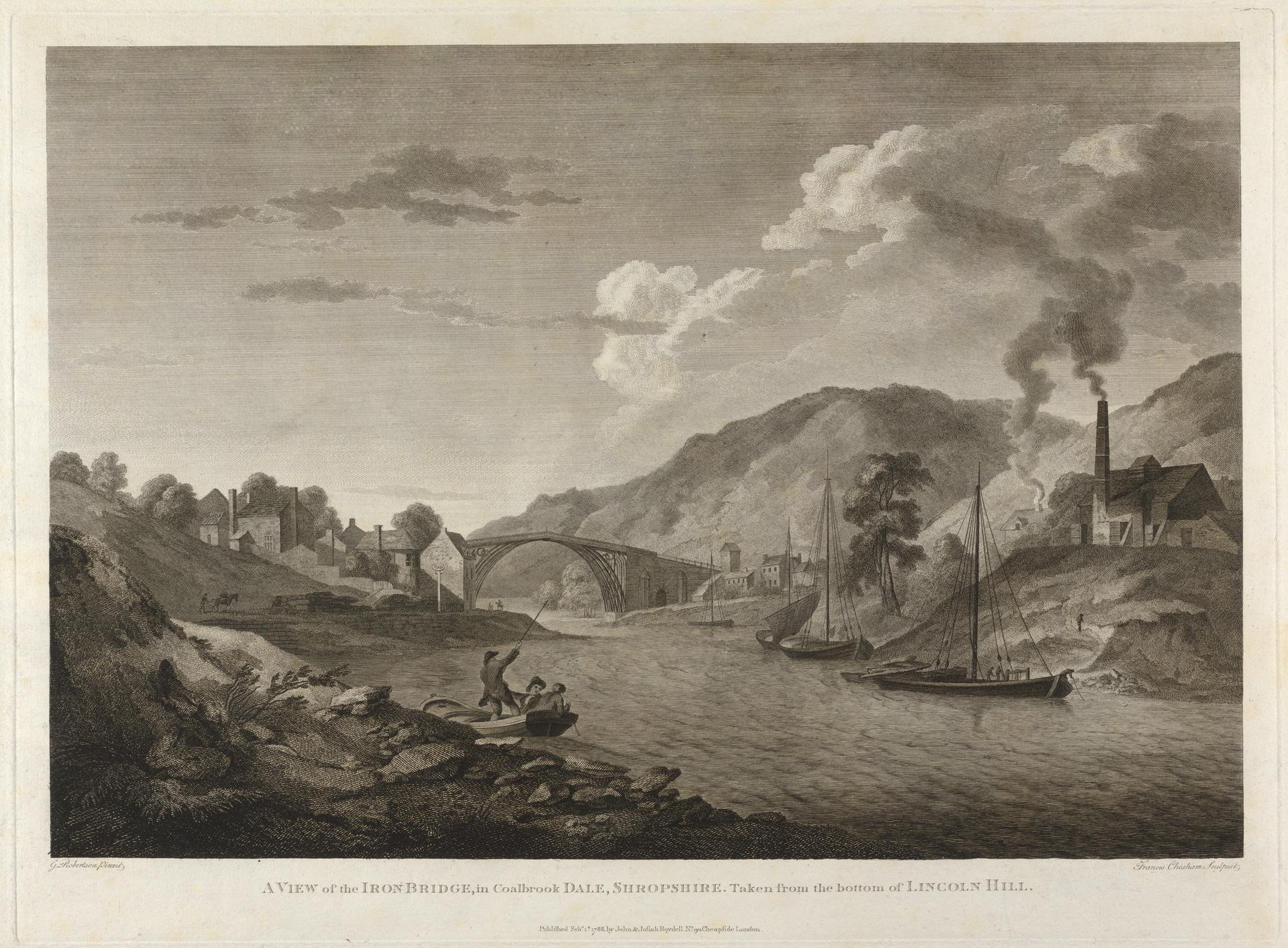
Chesham's engraving of The Iron Bridge, Coalbrookdale

Chesham exhibited in 1777 at the Royal Incorporated Society of Artists in Piccadilly an engraving The Death of Richard III, after John James Barralet, and in the following year The Death of William Rufus. He was then living in Broad Street, Golden Square. In 1780 he exhibited with the Society of Artists at Spring Gardens Inside of the Chapter House at Margam and View of the Abbey Church at Llanthony. In 1779–80 he engraved several views of various places in the United Kingdom, after Paul Sandby, for Michael Angelo Rooker's Copper Plate Magazine.

In 1788 the Boydells published two engravings by Chesham, after George Robertson: A View of the Iron Bridge in Coalbrookdale, Shropshire, and A View of the Mouth of a Coal Pit near Broseley in Shropshire. These two plates are well engraved in the style and method brought into fashion by François Vivares and his school. Chesham also engraved after his own design a large plate Moses striking the Rock; after Giovanni Battista Ciprianil he engraved an allegorical figure of Britannia; and after Robert Dodd, The Naval Victory gained by Admiral Parker in 1781. Chesham died in London in 1806.
