= Anne Pars =

British artist (c. 1750– after 1787)

Anne Pars (c. 1750 – after 1787) was an English painter.

Born in London, Pars was the daughter of Albertus Pars (1702–1773), a goldsmith who had emigrated from the Netherlands. Her brothers included Henry, an assistant drawing instructor at William Shipley's school; William, a painter; Albert, a wax modeller; and Edward, a goldworker. She likely received her early training at her brother's school. In 1764–66 she received prizes at the exhibitions of the Royal Society of Arts, and in 1774 she was employed at the Chelsea factory of Josiah Wedgewood, receiving a weekly salary of 10s. 6d. for her work, mainly on his Russian service. In 1786 she exhibited a crayon portrait at the Royal Academy, showing it as an amateur exhibitor.
