= Michael Angelo Rooker =

British artist

Village Scene

Michael Angelo Rooker ARA (1746 or 1743 – 3 March 1801) was an English oil and watercolour painter of architecture and landscapes, illustrator and engraver. He was also the principal scene painter at the Haymarket Theatre.

== Life and work ==
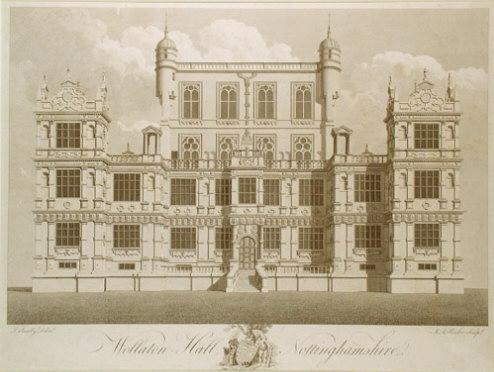
Wollaton Hall (engraved by Rooker after Paul Sandby)

Michael was the son of artist Edward Rooker and Elizabeth Coatham and was taught engraving by his father and drawing by Paul Sandby at the St. Martin's Lane school in London and at the Royal Academy Schools. It was Sandby who called him Michael "Angelo" Rooker in jest, but the name stuck.

In 1765 he exhibited some 'stained' drawings at the exhibition in Spring Gardens, London and in 1768 a print by him of the 'Villa Adriana' (after Richard Wilson), was published. In 1770 he was elected an Associate of the Royal Academy. In 1772 he exhibited a painting of Temple Bar, and he contributed some illustrations to an edition of Sterne, published that year. Most of the landscapes in Kearsley's Copperplate Magazine (1776–1777) were engraved by him, as well as a few plates in its successor, 'The Virtuosi's Museum', and he both drew and engraved the headings of the Oxford Almanack for several years, for each of which he received 50 pounds.

For a long time he was chief scene-painter at the Haymarket Theatre in London, and appeared in the playbills as Signer Rookerini; but a few years before his death he was discharged, in consequence, it is said, of his refusal to aid in paying the debts of Colman, the manager.

In 1788 he began to make autumnal tours in the country, to which we owe most of those drawings which entitle him to an honourable place among the founders of the watercolour school. They are chiefly of architectural remains in Norfolk, Suffolk, Somerset, Warwickshire, and other counties, which he drew well, and treated with taste and refinement. His figures and animals were artistically introduced.

Rooker became depressed after his discharge from the Haymarket Theatre, and died suddenly in his chair in Dean Street, Soho, on 3 March 1801. His drawings were sold at Squib's auction room in Savile Row in the following May, and realised £1,240.

Rooker was unmarried and lived his whole life in London. He exhibited one drawing at the Society of Artists, and ninety-eight at the Royal Academy. He was admired by J. M. W. Turner who learnt an aspect of painting technique called "colour scaling" by copying Rooker's "Gatehouse at Battle Abbey", and purchased over a dozen of Rooker's paintings after his death.
