= Michael Burghers =

Dutch illustrator and artist

- Born: c. 1647–8; Amsterdam, Dutch Republic
- Died: 9 January 1727 (age 78-79); Oxford, England
- Resting place: St Peter-in-the-East, Oxford
- Style: Engraving

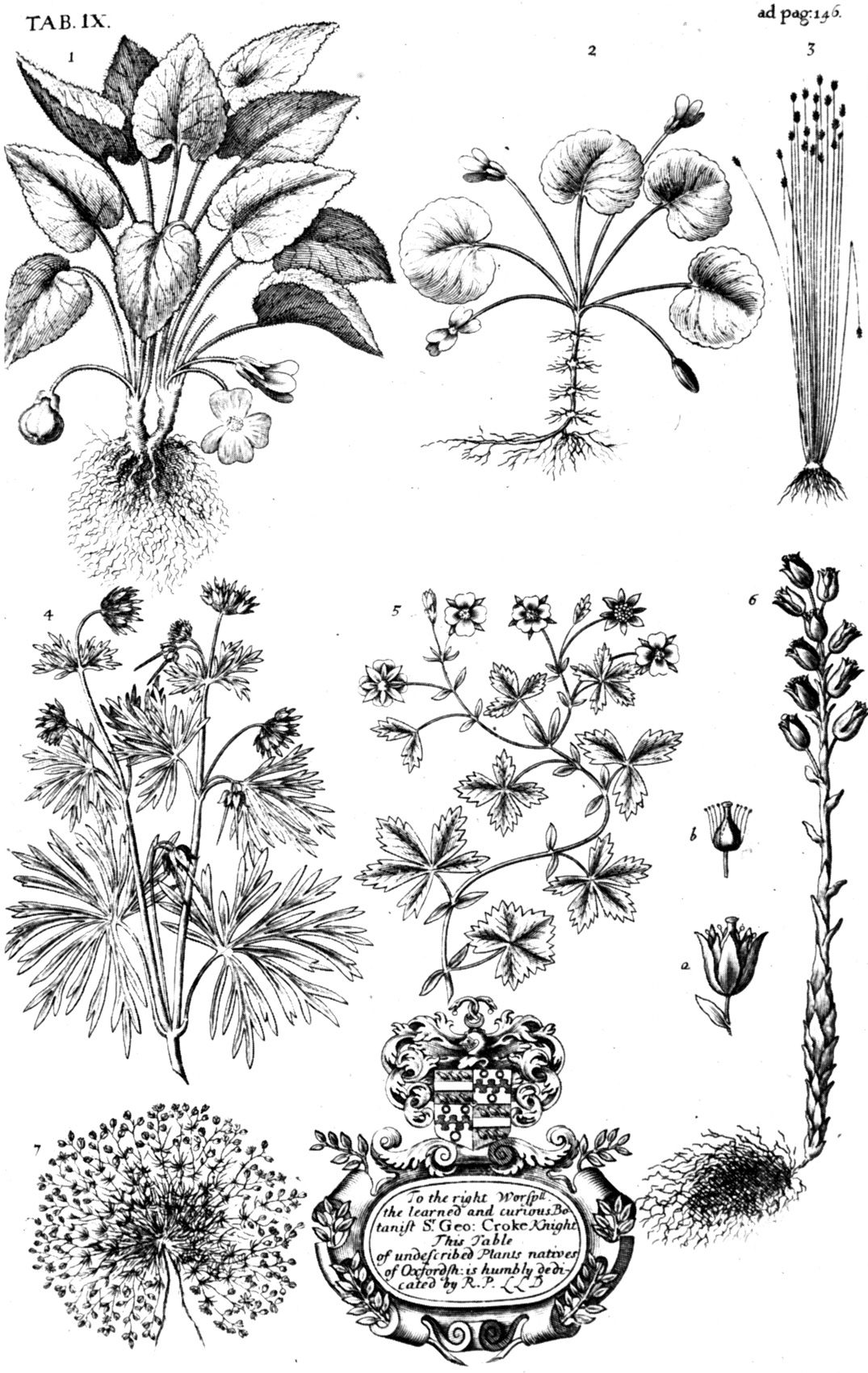
Plate 9 from Natural History of Oxfordshire, by Robert Plot, from 1677.

Michael Burghers (c. 1647–8 – 9 January 1727) was a Dutch illustrator and artist of the 17th century, who spent most of his career in England. He was commissioned to create maps, estate plans, and illustrations of stately houses, by the English aristocracy.

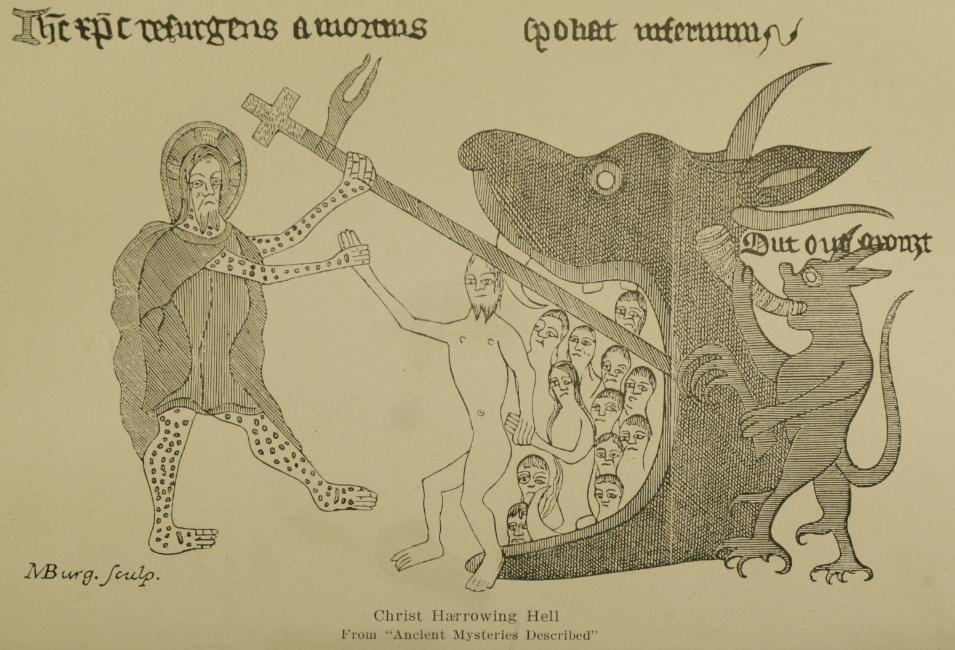
Descent into Hell, published in his own Ancient Mysteries Described.

== Biography ==
Michael Burghers was a Dutch engraver born in Amsterdam around 1647 or 1648 (Note: In 1724, Burghers told Thomas Hearne that he was seventy-six years old, placing his birth year as 1647 or 1648.) and he was baptised in a Lutheran church before being apprenticed as an engraver. He settled in England on the taking of Utrecht by Louis XIV on 12 June 1672.

Burghers arrived in Oxford probably in early 1673, and he became David Loggan's assistant from 1673. He succeeded Loggan as the University of Oxford engraver after Loggan died in July 1692, and he was in the position to add on several of his plates Academiae Oxon. calcographus after his name by 1694.

He was the author of a book, Ancient Mysteries Described, which was reprinted into the early 19th century.

Describing Burghers' style, Joseph Strutt wrote in 1786:

He worked almost wholly with the graver, in a stiff, tasteless style, without genius, or knowledge of the art of design. His drawing, when he attempted to draw the naked figure is wholly defective. He has, though, painfully preserved many ancient reliques, the originals of which are now lost.

Strutt thought that Burghers' best plates were his copies after Claude Mellan, and his topographical work, much of it for the antiquary Thomas Hearne.

His eyesight declined towards the end of his life and he made the decision to step down from engraving in 1719. He died on 9 January 1727 and was buried on 12 January 1727 in St Peter-in-the-East, Oxford.

=== Personal life ===
Burghers sent a letter to Hans Sloane on 28 October 1698 where he mentioned to Sloane that he was not yet fluent in the English language.

== Works ==
From 1676 Burghers engraved the plates for the Almanacks of the university. His most esteemed prints are his antiquities, ruins of abbeys, and other curiosities. He also engraved several portraits and plates for the classics. They include:

=== Book illustrations ===
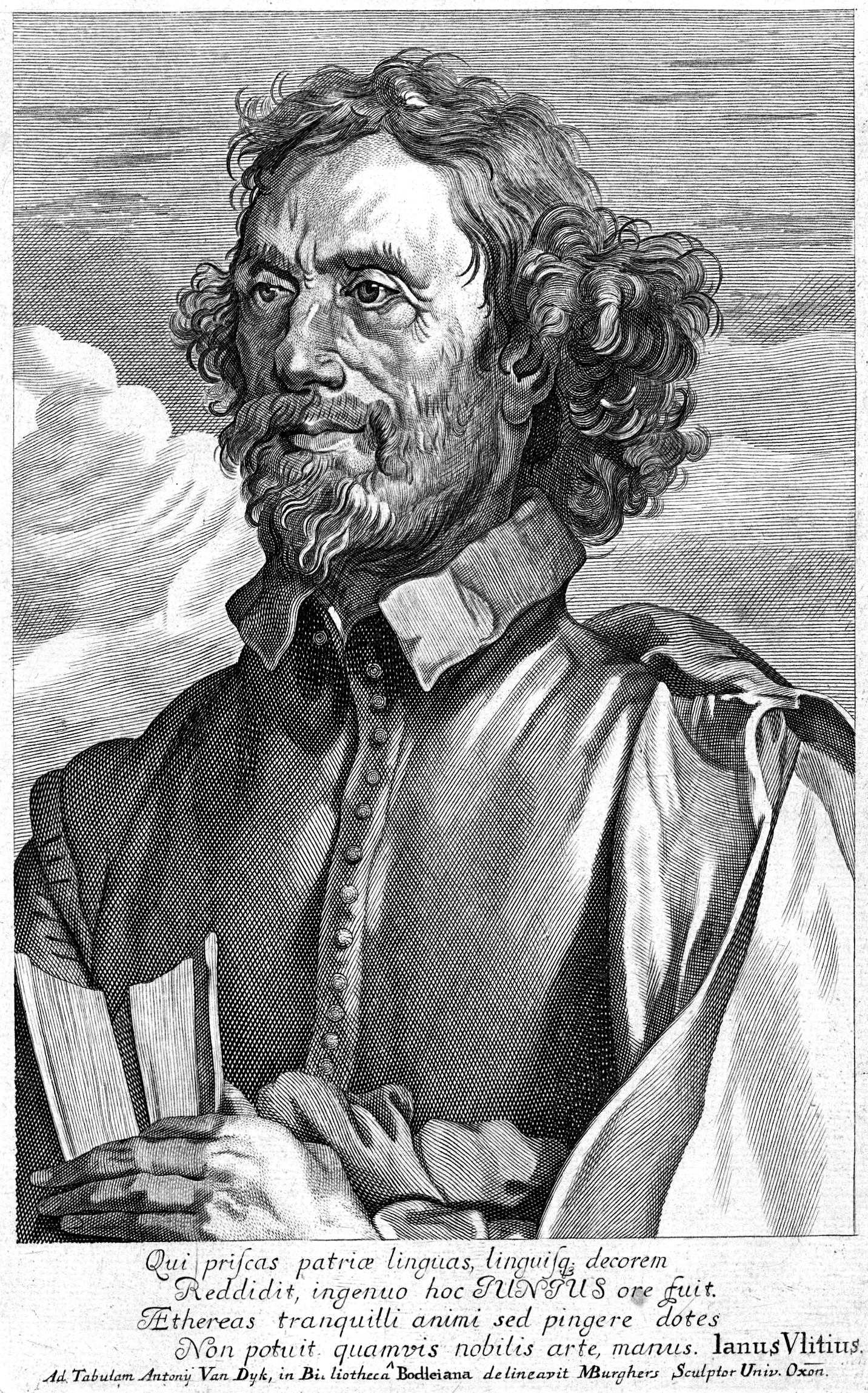
François Junius (Michael Burghers, 1698, after Anthony van Dyck)

- Illustrations to Dr. Plot's Natural History of Oxfordshire. Being an Essay towards the Natural History of England. 1677.
- Illustrations to Robert Plot's Natural History of Staffordshire. 1686. (pictured)
- Illustrations to Dr. White Kennet's History of Ambroseden.
- Illustrations to the fourth edition of Milton's Paradise Lost, published by Jacob Tonson. Burghers engraved eleven of the twelve plates; seven of them after drawings by J.B. de Medina; the drawings for the others may have been by Henry Aldrich.
- Engravings of ichnographies in Browne Willis's Survey of York, Durham, Carlisle, Chester, Man, Lichfield, Hereford, Worcester, Gloucester, and Bristol Cathedrals. 1727. The exception is Man.

=== Other plates ===
- William Somner, the antiquary; after van Dyck (pictured)
- Franciscus Junius; after the same.
- John Barefoot, letter doctor to the University. 1681.
- Illustrated Plate in Philosophical Transactions, 1684, vol 14.
- Head of James II for an Almanack. 1686.
- Anthony à Wood; in a niche; his only mezzotint.
- King Alfred; from a MS. in the Bodleian Library.
- Sir Thomas Bodley; in the corners of the plate are the heads of the other benefactors of the Bodleian Library; William, Earl of Pembroke, Archbishop Laud, Sir Kenelm Digby, and John Selden. The plate was published as a frontispiece to a catalogue of manuscripts in the library.
- Timothy Hatton, provost of Queen's College.
- Dr. Wallis. 1699.
- Sir Thomas Wyat.
- John Baliol.
- Devorguilla, his spouse.
- Dr. Ratcliff.
- The Visage of Christ; engraved in the manner of Claude Mellan, with a single line.
