= William Pars =

English painter (1742–1782)

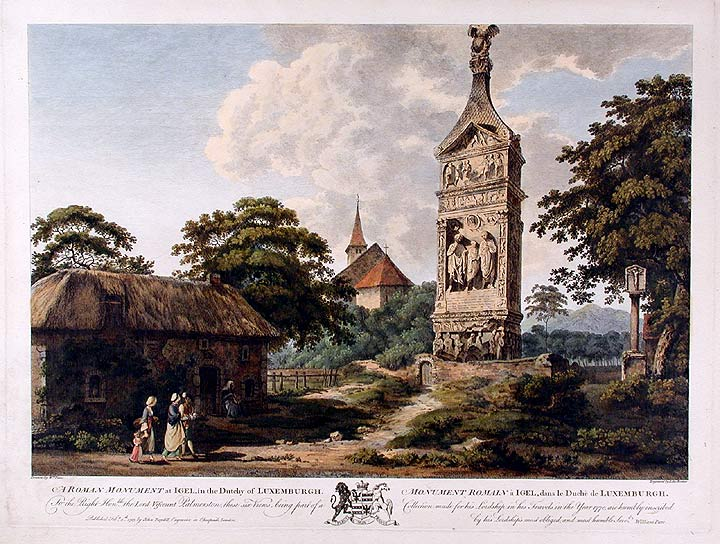
A Roman monument at Igel (Engraving by John Boydell after Edward Rooker based on a work by Pars)

William Pars ARA (28 February 1742 – 1782) was an English watercolour portrait and landscape painter, draughtsman, and illustrator.

== Life and works ==
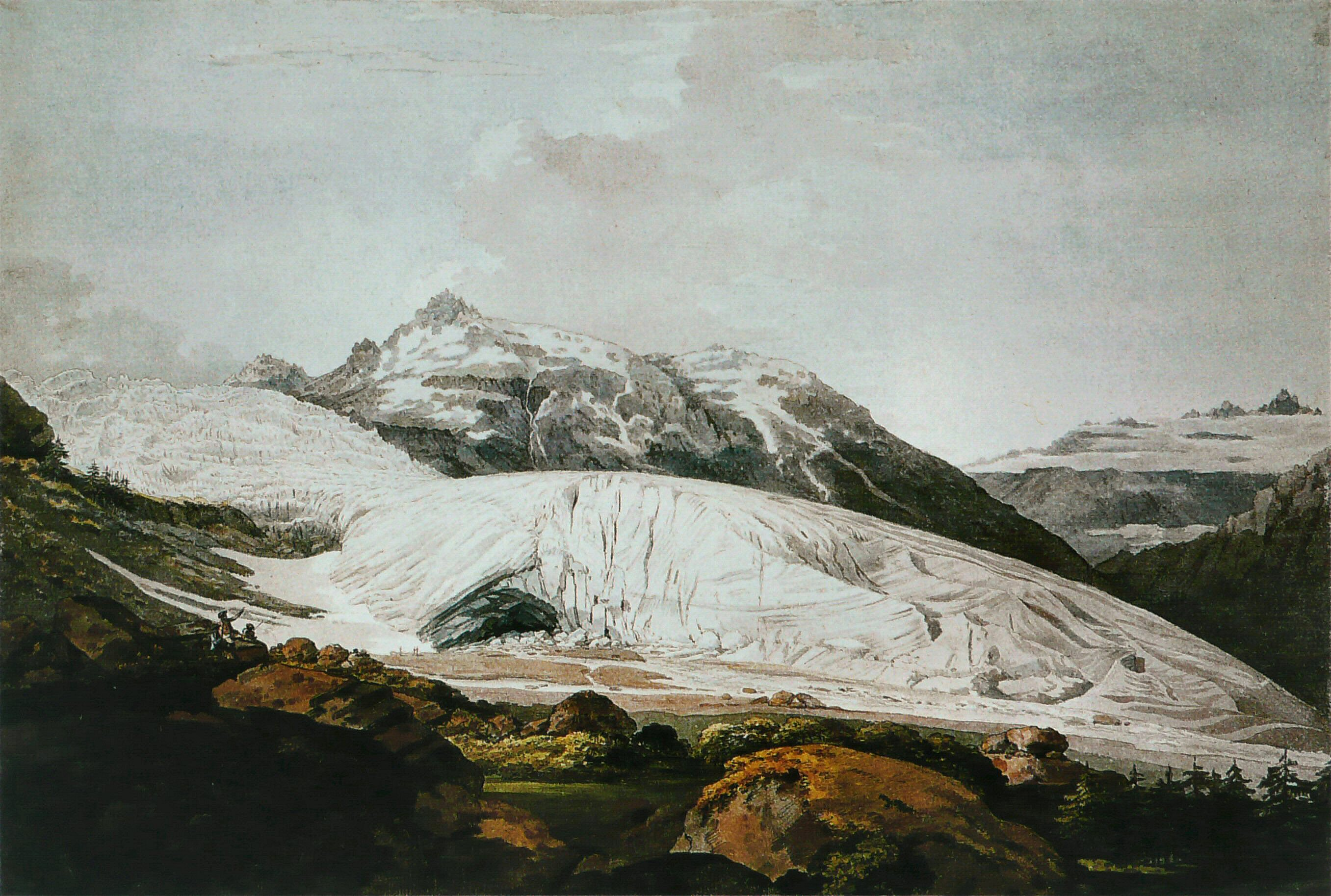
Rhone Glacier circa 1770–71, watercolour)

Pars was born in London, the son of a metal engraver. He studied at "Shipley's Drawing School" (in the Strand), St. Martin's Lane Academy, and also in the Duke of Richmond's Gallery. In 1761, at the age of 17, he exhibited a portrait and miniatures at the Incorporated Society of Artists, and became a member of the Free Society of Artists in 1763. In 1764, he obtained the Society of Arts' medal for an historical painting.

In June 1764, he was selected by the Dilettanti Society to accompany, as draughtsman, Richard Chandler and Nicholas Revett to Greece. The result was published in Ionian Antiquities (4 volumes) which was illustrated from Pars's drawings.

Pars returned to England on 2 December 1766, and soon after accompanied Henry Temple, 2nd Viscount Palmerston, to the continent, making drawings in Switzerland, the Tyrol, and Rome. In 1769, he contributed seven views from Greece to the first exhibition of the Royal Academy. He was elected an associate in 1770, and in the following year, he sent eight European views, chiefly of Switzerland and the Tyrol, together with one portrait. He contributed regularly (chiefly portraits) to the academy exhibitions till 1776.

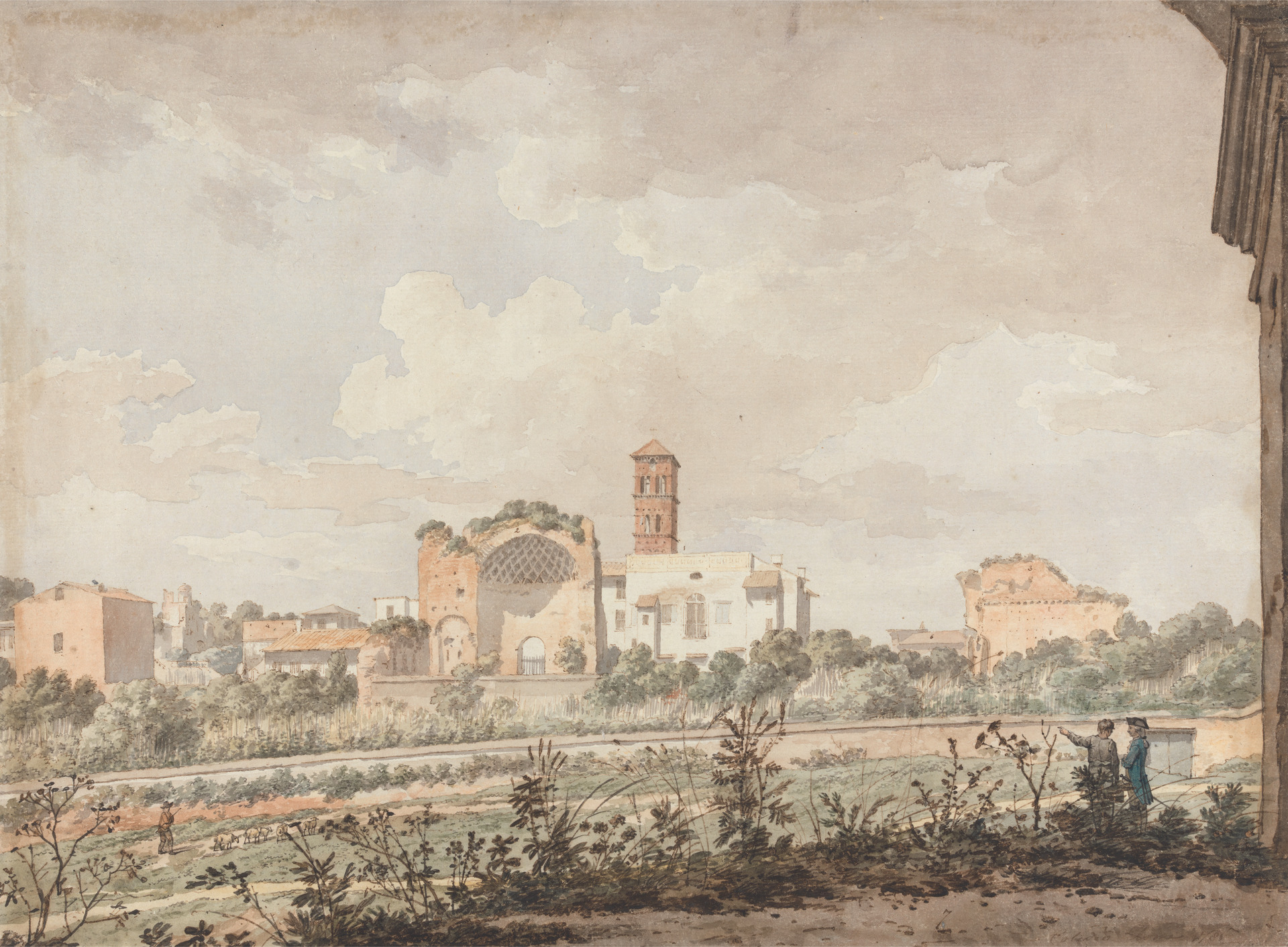
Temple of Venus and Rome from the Colosseum by William Pars, watercolour with pen and ink, 1781

In the summer of 1775, he travelled to Rome on a bursary of the Dilettanti Society, where artists such as John Warwick Smith, Francis Towne (a friend of Pars, who took some instruction in drawing from him) John Robert Cozens, and Thomas Jones were working. He remained there till the autumn of 1782, when he died of pleurisy (his wife having died in the city in June 1778).

A selection of Pars' Greek drawings was engraved by William Byrne for the Dilettanti Society; five of his Swiss drawings, including the Mer de Glace, were engraved by William Woollett; and several other drawings were aquatinted by Paul Sandby.

Pars' elder brother Henry Pars (1734–1806) was a draughtsman and metal engraver, becoming the principal of Shipley's Drawing School. His sister Anne showed some talent as a pastellist, as well.

== See also ==
- James Stuart (1713–1788) – like Pars, he also recorded antiquities in Greece and accompanied Nicholas Revett on tours.
