= Pierre-Nicolas Chantreau =

French historian, journalist, grammarian and lexicographer

Pierre Nicolas Chantreau, called don Chantreau, (1741, in Paris – 25 October 1808, in Auch) was an 18th-century French historian, journalist, grammarian and lexicographer.

== Biography ==
Around 1762, at the age of twenty or twenty-one, he traveled to Spain to become a teacher of French at the Royal School of Ávila. He published a French grammar for use by Hispanics which earned him to enter the Real Academia Española and receive the title of don Chantreau. Back in France in 1782, he joined the revolutionary ideas and became an employee at the libraries section of the Committee of Public Instruction. In 1792, he was appointed responsible for an investigation to the Spanish border, secret mission whose purpose was to ensure the feelings of Catalans to the French Revolution. In 1794, he proposed the departmental director of Gers the creation of an educational newspaper Les Documents de la raison, feuille antifanatique, then wrote the Courrier du département du Gers. He was later a teacher of history at the école centrale in Auch in 1796, then at the l'École militaire, then based in Fontainebleau, in 1803

While his historical charts and chronologies quickly fell into oblivion, his lexicon of the words of the Revolution inspired Louis-Sébastien Mercier a Néologie ou vocabulaire de mots nouveaux and his French grammar, of which several editions followed one another until 1926, was a milestone in the history of language teaching in Spain.

== Works ==
- Arte de hablar bien francés, ó Gramática completa (1781)
- Dictionnaire national et anecdotique, pour servir à l'intelligence des mots dont notre langue s'est enrichie depuis la révolution, et à la nouvelle signification qu'ont reçue quelques anciens mots, enrichi d'une notice exacte et raisonnée des journaux, gazettes et feuilletons antérieurs à cette époque, avec un appendice contenant les mots qui vont cesser d'être en usage, et qu'il est nécessaire d'insérer dans nos archives pour l'intelligence de nos neveux, par M. de L'Epithète, élève de feu M. Beauzée, académicien, mort de l'Académie française (1790) (Read online)
- Lettres écrites de Barcelonne à un zélateur de la liberté qui voyage en Allemagne, ou voyage en Espagne, ouvrage dans lequel on donne des détails : 1° sur l'état dans lequel se trouvaient les frontières de l'Espagne en 1792; 2° sur le sort des émigrés dans ce pays, avec des détails philosophiques sur les mœurs, etc. (1792)
- Voyage dans les trois royaumes d'Angleterre, d'Écosse et d'Irlande, fait en 1788 et 1789 (3 volumes, 1792). Reprint: Elibron Classics, Adamant Media Corporation, 2006.
- Voyage philosophique, politique et littéraire fait en Russie pendant les années 1788 et 1789, traduit du hollandais, avec une augmentation considérable, par le citoyen Chantreau (2 volumes, 1794)
- Manuel des instituteurs. Essai didactique, dans lequel on indique l'espèce de livres élémentaires qui conviennent à nos nouvelles écoles, la manière de les faire, et les moyens d'en tirer le plus grand fruit (1794)
- Tables chronologiques qui embrassent toutes les parties de l'histoire universelle, année par année, depuis la création du monde jusqu'en 1768, publiées en anglais par John Blair, et traduites en français par le citoyen Chantreau, qui les a continuées jusqu'à la paix conclue avec l'Espagne en 1795 (1795)
- Système analytique des notions qu'il faut acquérir pour connaître complètement l'histoire d'une nation, et le plan à suivre pour l'écrire (1799)
- Table analytique et raisonnée des matières contenues dans les soixante-dix volumes des Œuvres de Voltaire (2 volumes, 1801). Édition dite de Beaumarchais.
- De l'Importance de l'étude de l'histoire et de la vraie manière de l'enseigner, d'après un nouveau plan présenté par tableaux (1802)
- Mappemonde chronographique pour l'histoire ancienne et moderne, avec une explication qui en facilite l'usage (1803)
- Science de l'histoire, contenant le système général des connoissances à acquérir avant d'étudier l'histoire et la méthode à suivre quand on se livre à ce genre d'étude, développée par tableaux synoptiques (3 volumes, 1803–1806)
- Notice élémentaire sur l'origine, la fondation et les changemens qu'ont éprouvés pendant leur durée les empires et états dont il est fait mention dans l'histoire de l'Europe, de l'Asie et de l'Afrique, pour servir à l'étude de la Mappemonde chronologique de l'ancien continent (1804)
- Élémens d'histoire militaire, contenant toutes les notions nécessaires à l'intelligence de l'histoire militaire des peuples, avec un précis des guerres qu'ils ont entreprises depuis l'ère des Olympiades jusqu'au traité de Tilsitt (1808)
- Histoire de France abrégée et chronologique, depuis la première expédition des Gaulois jusqu'en septembre 1808, rédigée en forme de mémorial, d'après l'Art de vérifier les dates (2 volumes, 1808)

== Bibliography ==
- Núria Moreu, Pierre-Nicolas Chantreau et sa « Grammaire », Publicacions de la Universitat de Barcelona, Barcelona, 1990.
- Javier Suso López, La Méthode traditionnelle théorico-pratique dans l'enseignement du français langue étrangère : de P.-N. Chantreau à Maurice Bouynot Read online
