= Oxford Almanack =

Annual illustrated directory for the University of Oxford

The Oxford Almanack was an annual almanac published by the Oxford University Press for the University of Oxford from 1674 to 2019.

The Oxford University Press originally held a monopoly on publishing almanacs. The almanacs traditionally included engravings and information about Oxford University, including the Heads of Colleges and a university calendar. No almanack appeared in 1675, but it had been published annually since 1676.

Engravers and artists have included James Basire, Michael Burghers, J. M. W. Turner, and John Piper.

== List of almanacks since 1992 ==
Petter's The Oxford Almanacks lists the scenes depicted and their illustrators up to 1973, and the list is continued to 1991 in Bradshaw's article in Oxoniensia (see Further Reading for both references).

Year	Illustration	Artist
1992	Sir Geoffrey Arthur Building, Pembroke College	
1993	St Hilda's College	Hugh Casson
1994	Oxford University Press	
1995	St John's College	Ilana Richardson
1996	Tom Tower and the Radcliffe Camera	Jonathan Pike
1997	Covered Market	Michele Tranquillini
1998	North Oxford	Matthew Cook
1999	University College	Ron Sandford
2000	University Church	Sarah McMenemy
2001	Oxford in summer	David Mach
2002	High Street	David Prentice
2003	Folly Bridge	Oliver Warman
2004	Harris Manchester College	Philip Atkins
2005	Linacre College	Ben Pritchard
2006	Saïd Business School	Chris Andrews
2007	St Edmund Hall	Joseph Winkelman
2008	Magdalen College	Michael Chaplin
2009	Radcliffe Observatory	John Walsom
2010	Wadham College	Francis Hammel
2011	Oxford Canal & St Barnabas Church	John Newberry
2012	Botanic Garden	John Lawrence
2013	Balliol College	Ivan Green
2014	Exeter College	Tim Steward
2015	St Cross College	Robin Wilson
2016	St Catherine's College	Cathy Read
2017	Corpus Christi College	Ceri Allen
2018	Oxford Centre for Islamic Studies	Chris Fothergill
2019	Oxford University Press	William Monk
