= Paul Sandby =

English mapmaker and painter (1731–1809)

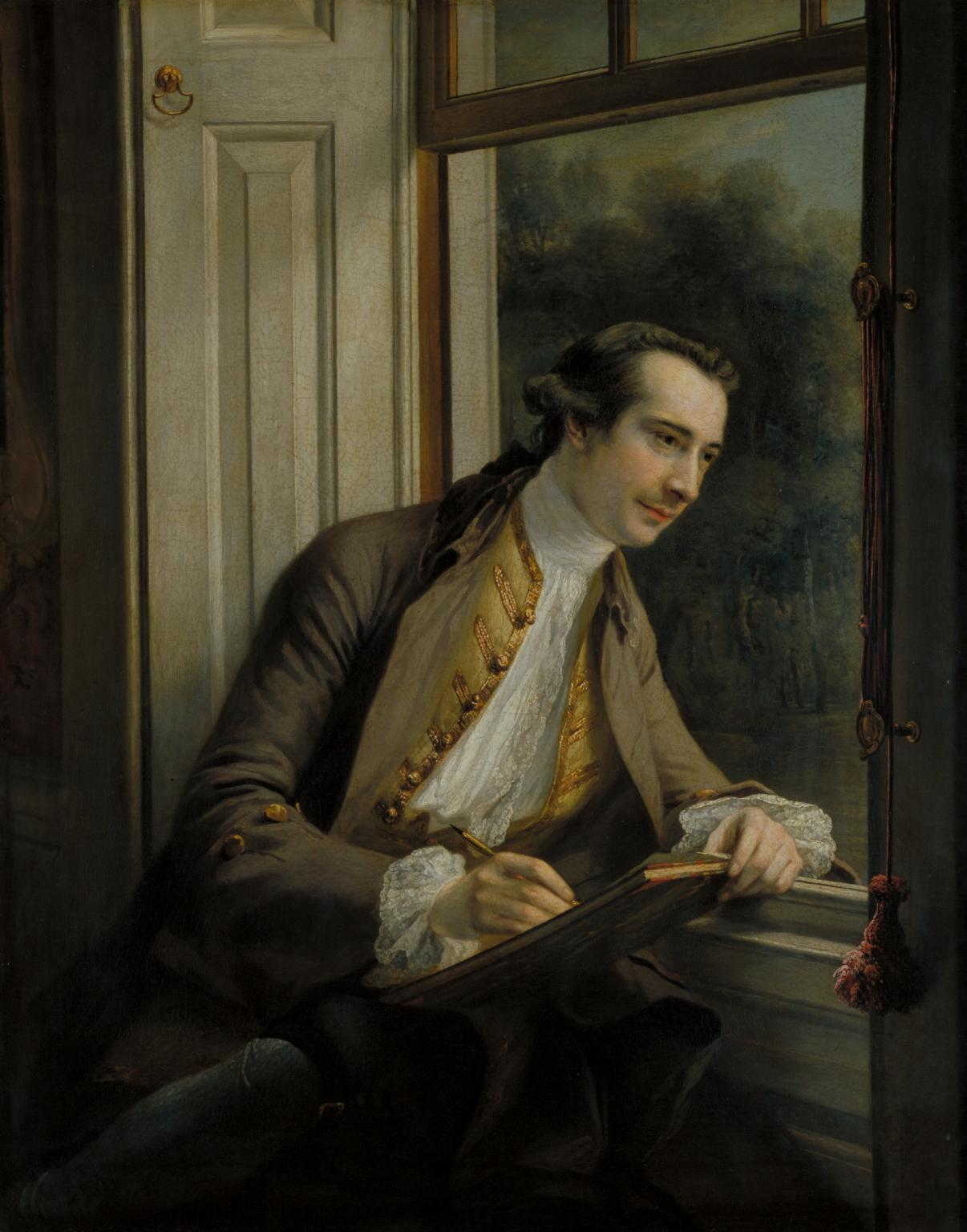
1761 portrait of Sandby by Francis Cotes

Paul Sandby, RA (1731 – 7 November 1809) was an English mapmaker and painter who specialised in landscape art. Along with his older brother Thomas Sandby, he was one of the founding members of the Royal Academy in 1768.

== Life and work ==
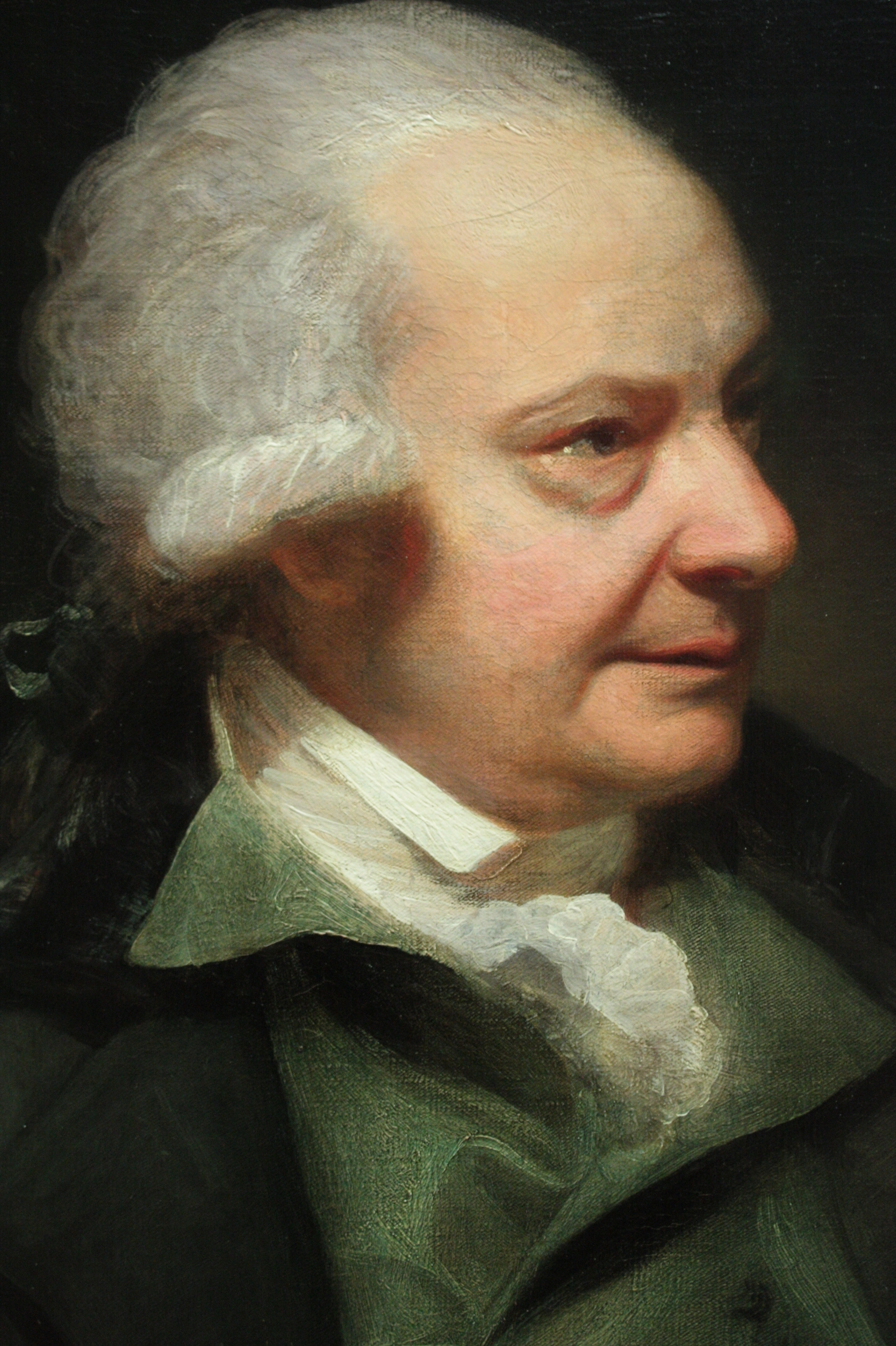
1789 portrait of Sandby by Sir William Beechey

Paul Sandby was born in Nottingham, and baptised there in 1731, although his date of birth has traditionally been given as 1725. In 1745 he moved to London where he followed his brother Thomas in obtaining an appointment in the military drawing department at the Tower of London.

While undertaking this commission, which included preparing designs for new bridges and fortifications, he began producing watercolour landscapes documenting the changes in Scotland since the rebellion, and making sketches of Scottish events such as the hanging in Edinburgh of soldier-turned-forger John Young in 1751. When in Edinburgh, he started sketching and drawing the landscapes of the city and was said to have to carried a copy of Theatrum Scotia in his pockets. One such sketching in the form of engraving, West View of the City of Edinburgh, is now displayed in the Scottish National Gallery of Modern Art.

He left his post with the survey in 1751, and spent some time living with his brother, who had been appointed Deputy Ranger of Windsor Great Park. There he assisted his brother, and made a series of drawings of the castle, the town, and its neighborhood, which were purchased by Sir Joseph Banks. His skills were applauded by fellow artists such as Thomas Gainsborough: if one wanted "real Views from Nature in this Country", declared Gainsborough in 1764, there was no better artist than Sandby, who frequently "employed his pencil that way."

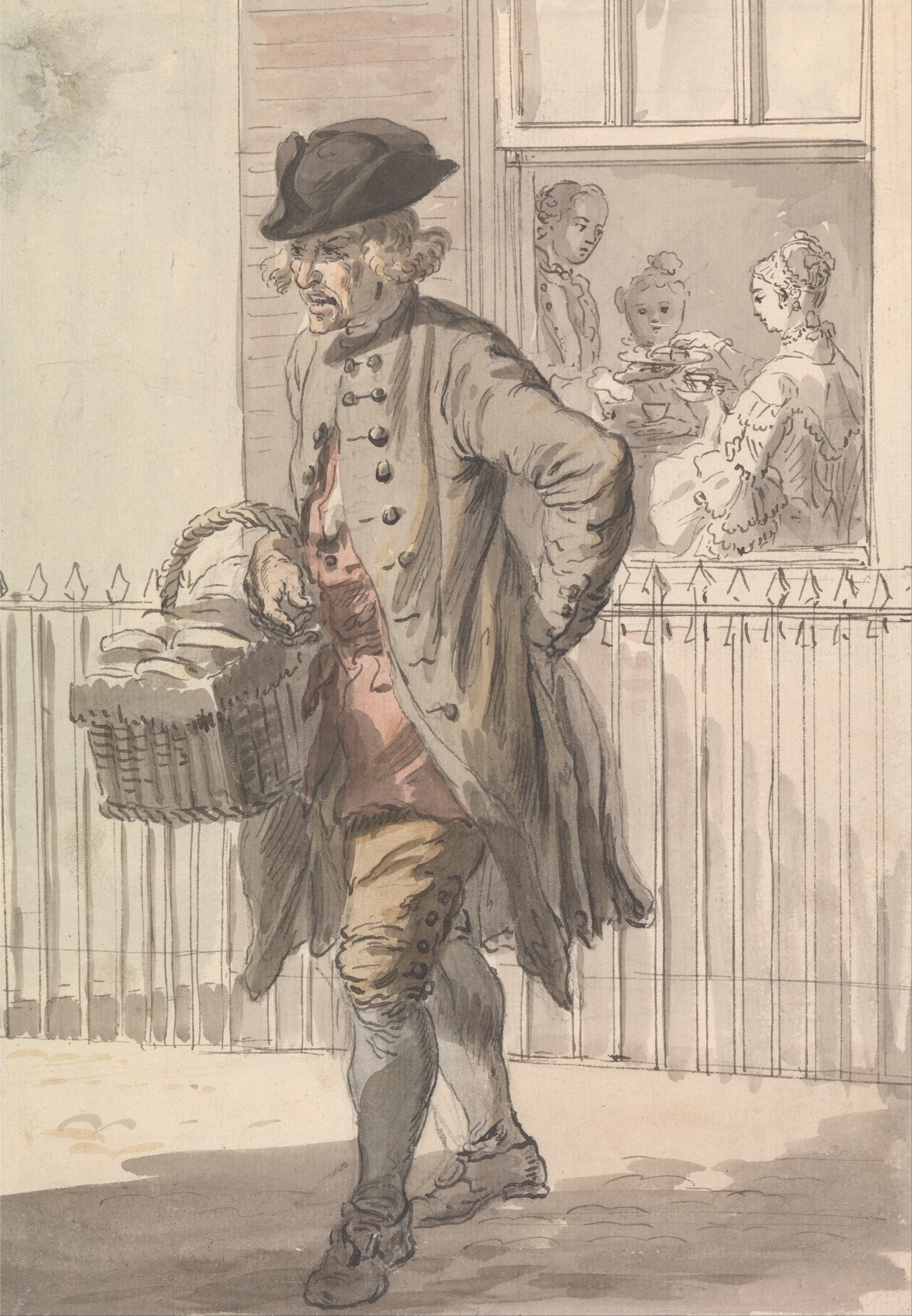
London Cries- A Muffin Man

He also etched a large number of plates after his own drawings, a hundred of which (including views of Edinburgh) were published in a volume in 1765. In 1760 he issued twelve etchings of The Cries of London. He also made many plates after other artists, including his brother. In 1753–4 he published, anonymously, several single caricatures satirising William Hogarth. He returned to the attack in 1762, and produced other satirical work sporadically throughout his career.

It is not recorded how long Sandby lived with his brother at Windsor, but he is said to have spent part of each year in London, and much of his time was probably spent on sketching excursions. On 3 May 1757 he married Anne Stogden, and by 1760 he was settled in London.

In 1760 he contributed to the first exhibition of the Society of Artists. He exhibited regularly with the society until the foundation of the Royal Academy eight years later, and was one of its first directors when it was incorporated in 1765. In 1768, he was appointed chief drawing master to the Royal Military Academy at Woolwich, a position he retained until 1799. On the formation of the Royal Academy in the same year he was one of the 28 founder-members nominated by George III. He often served on its council, and contributed to all but eight of the exhibitions held between 1769 and 1809.

Sandby made extensive journeys around Britain and Ireland, sketching scenery and ancient monuments. He made his first recorded visit to Wales in 1770, later (1773) touring south Wales with Sir Joseph Banks, resulting in the 1775 publication of XII Views in South Wales and a further 12 views the following year, part of a 48-plate series of aquatint engravings depicting Welsh scenery commissioned by Banks.

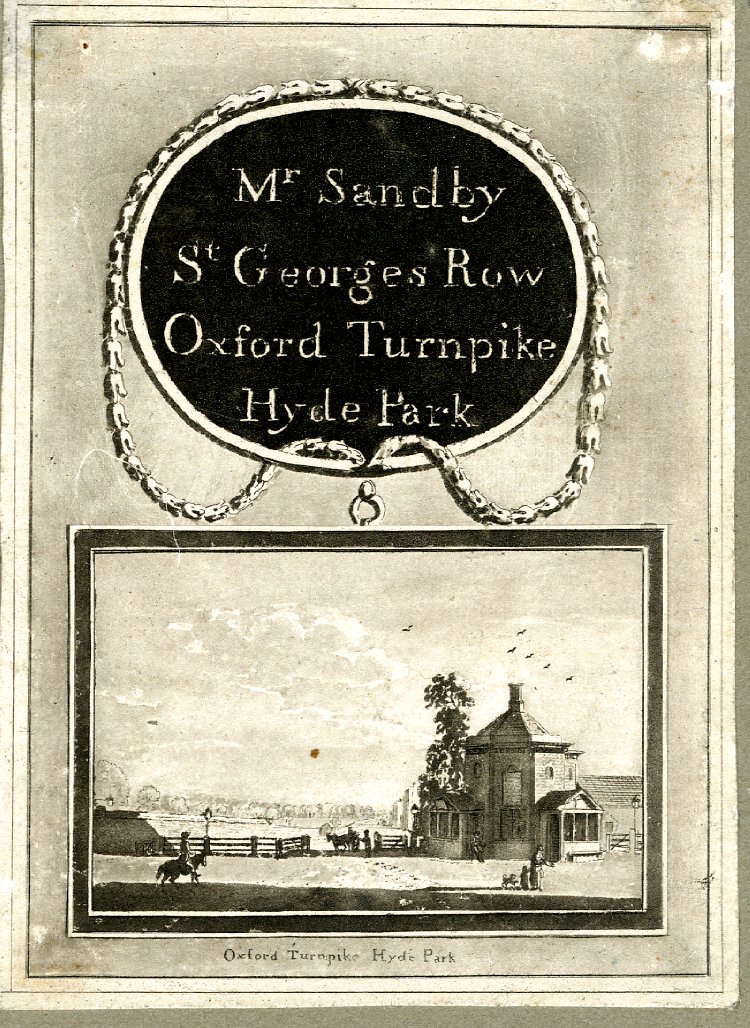
Trade card of Paul Sandby, drawing master

He died at his house in Paddington on 7 November 1809, and was buried in the burial ground of St George's, Hanover Square. He was described in his obituaries as "the father of modern landscape painting in watercolors".

== Gallery ==
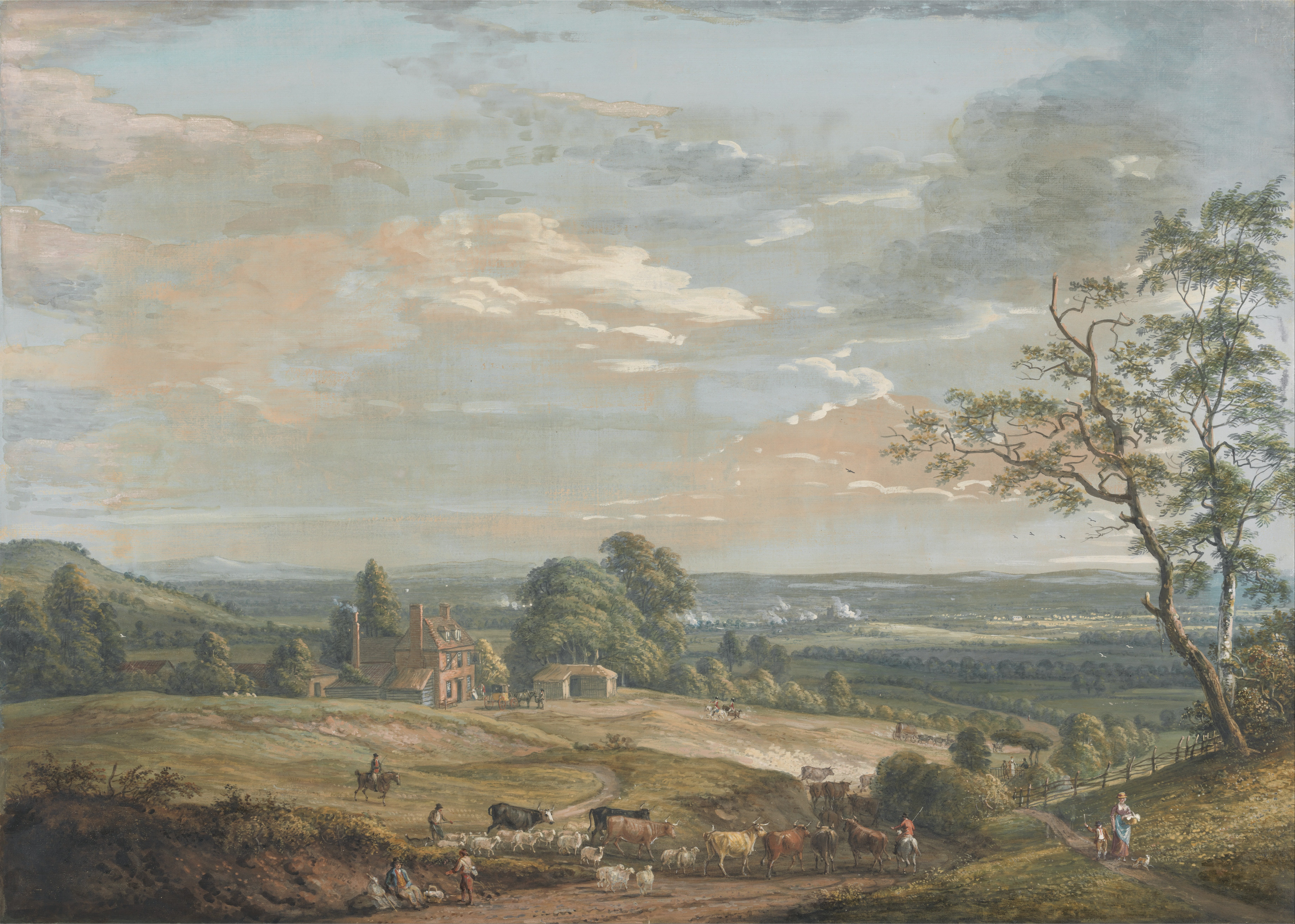
A Distant View of Maidstone, from Lower Bell Inn, Boxley Hill

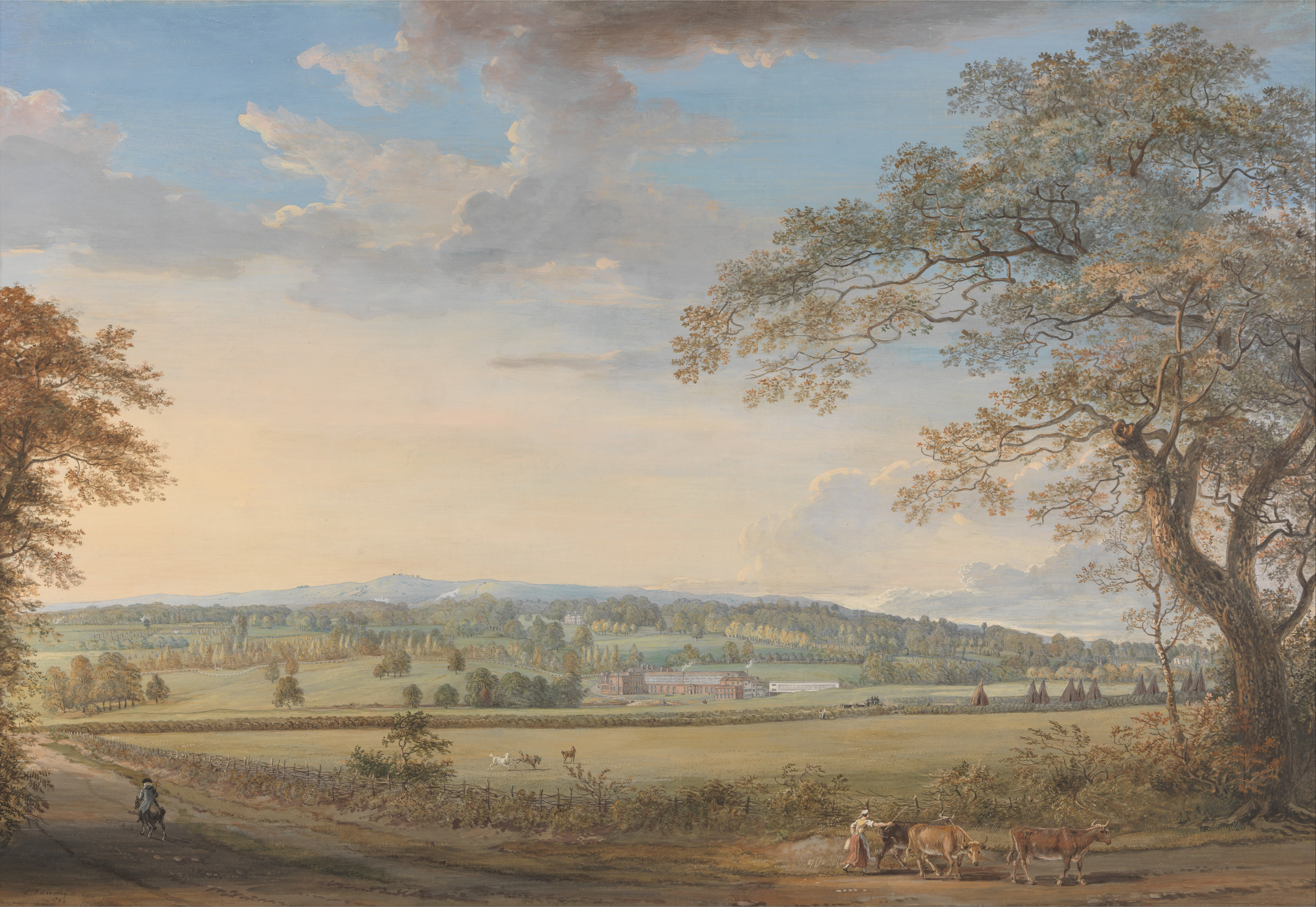
A View of Vinters at Boxley, Kent, with Mr. Whatman's Turkey Paper Mills

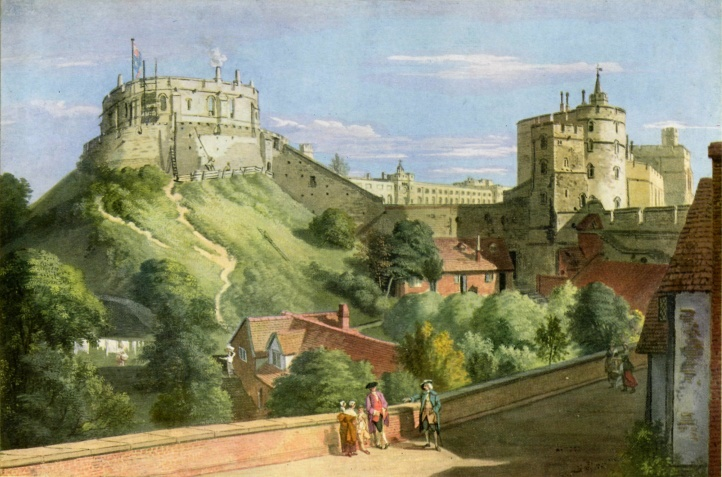
:Windsor Castle: View of the Round and Devils Towers from the Black Rock

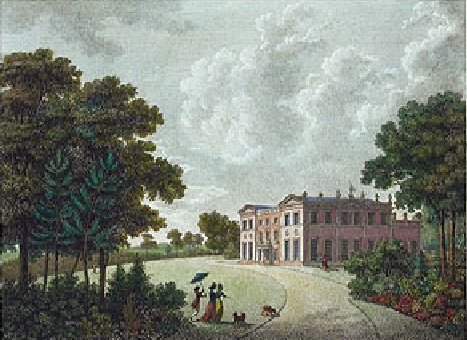
Watercolour of Woolton Hall, Liverpool, c. 1781

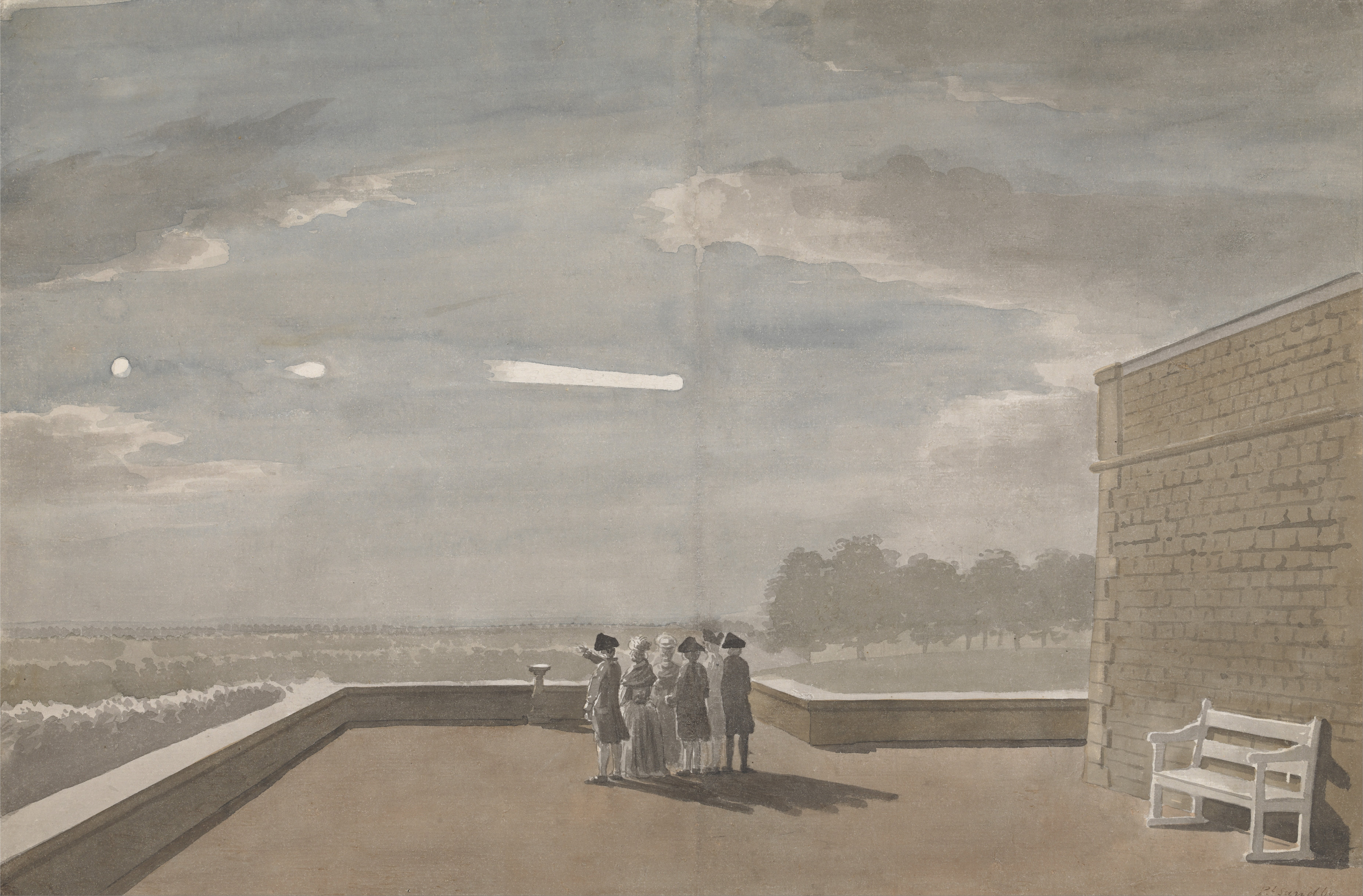
Watercolor of the 1783 Great Meteor, 1783

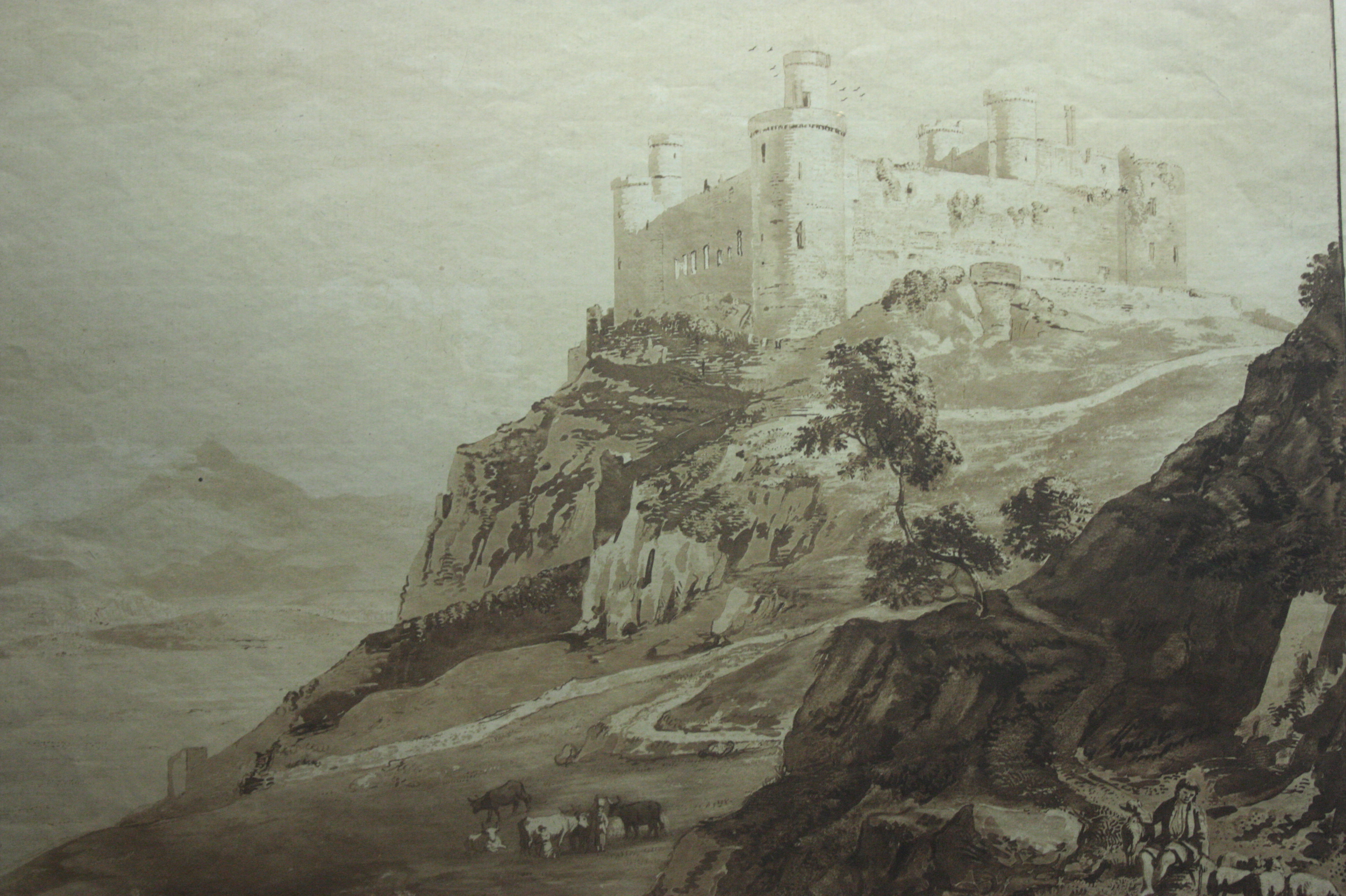
Harlech Castle by Paul Sandby 1776

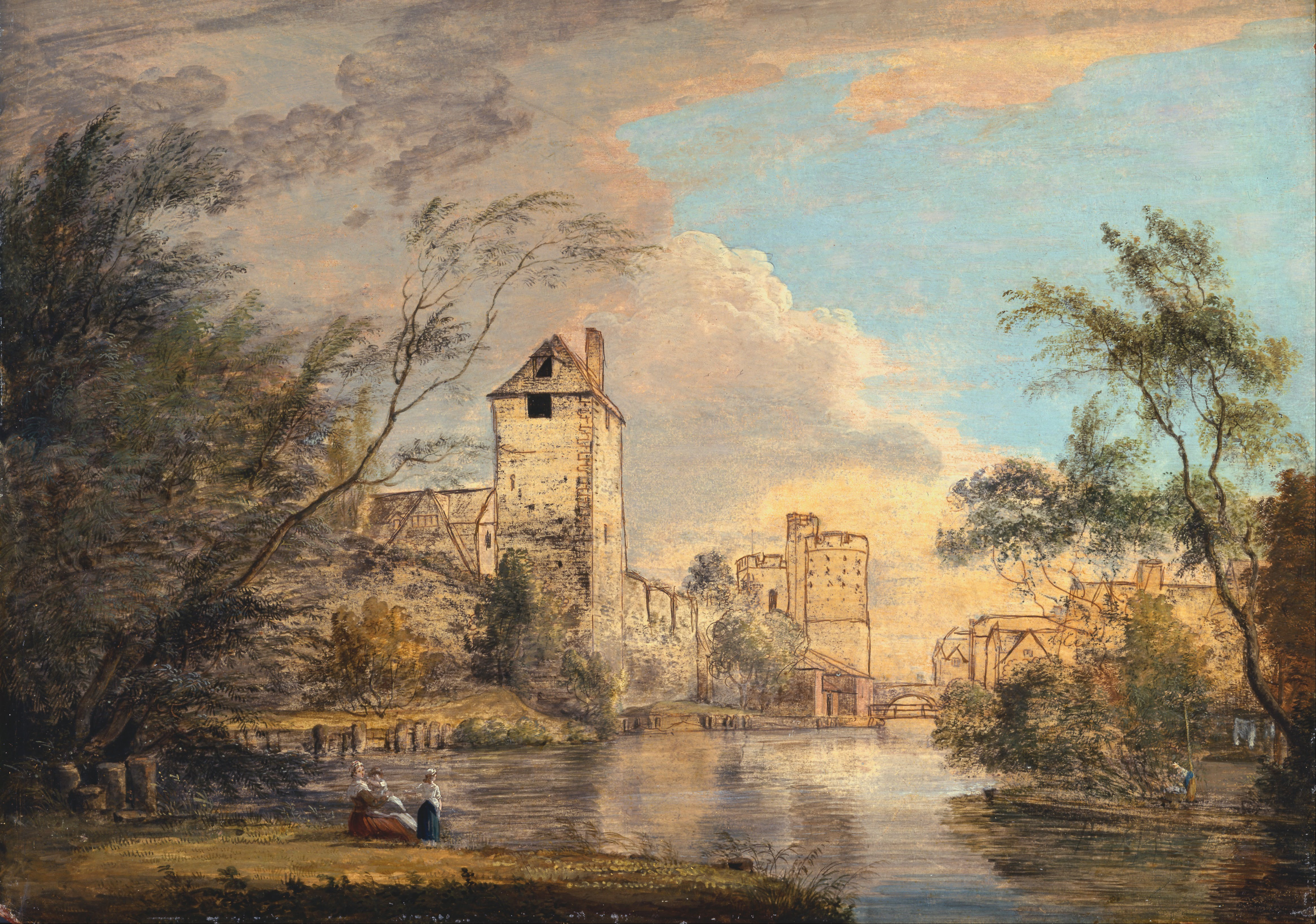
An Unfinished View of the West Gate, Canterbury

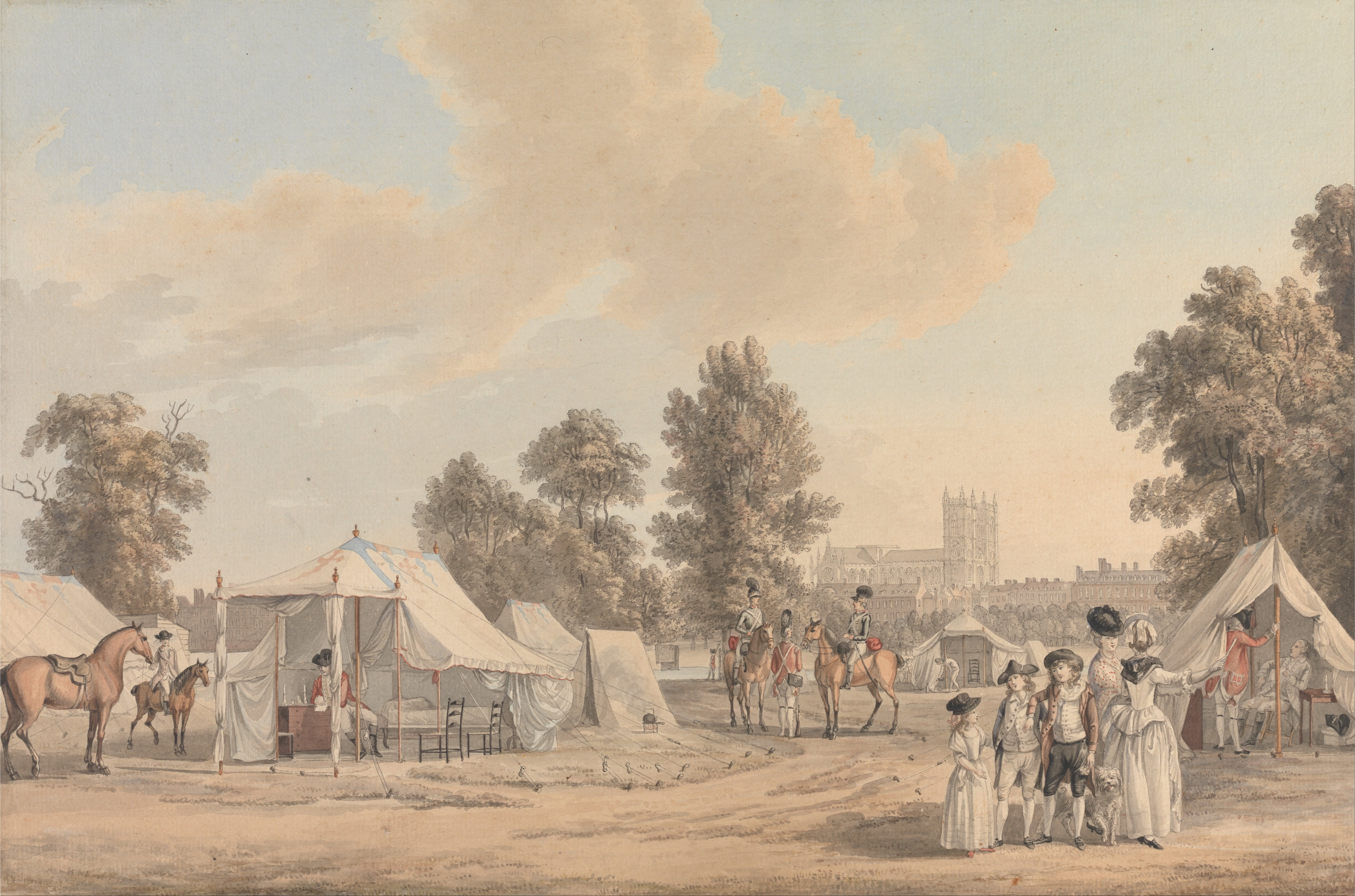
An Encampment in St. James Park

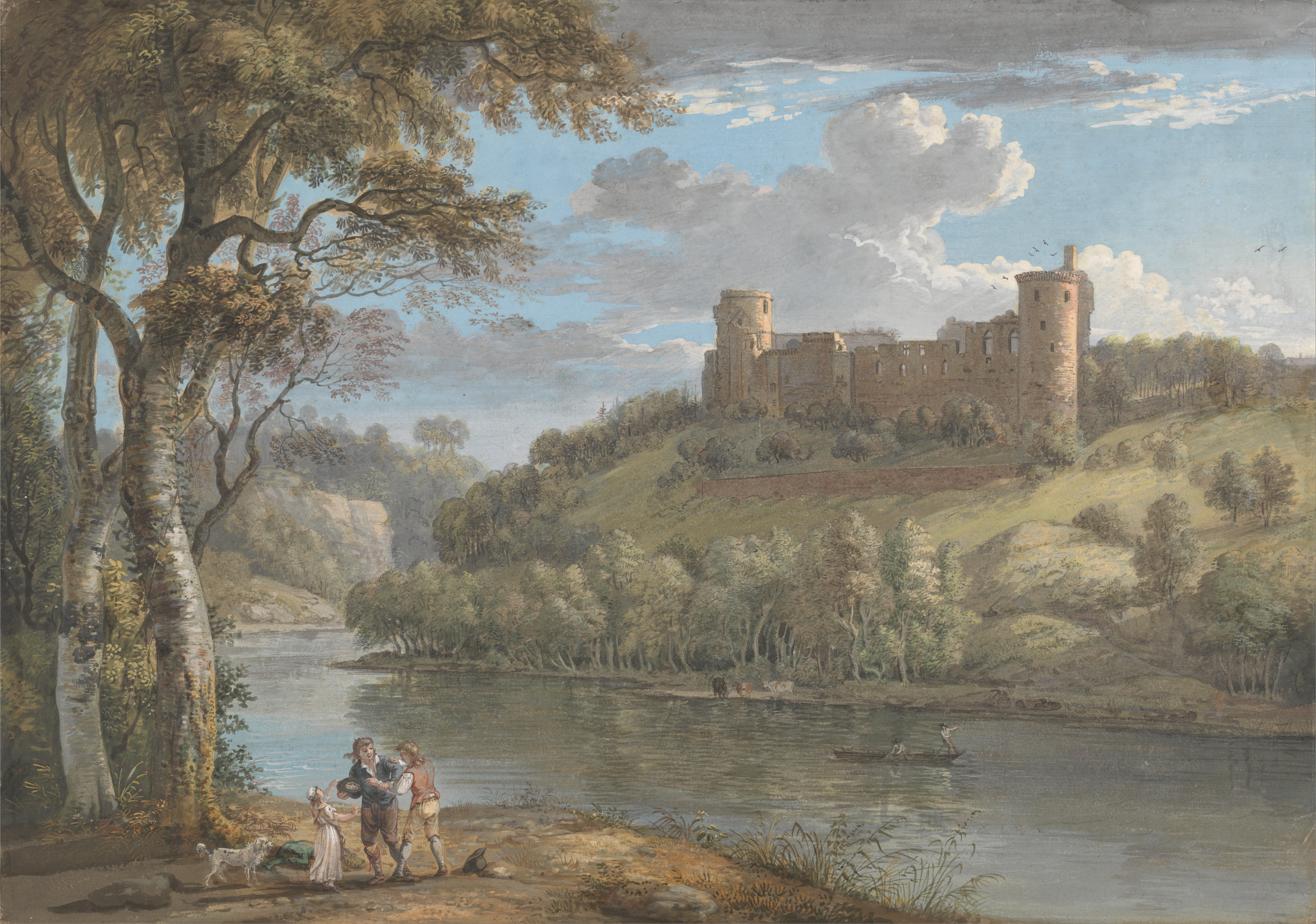
Bothwell Castle, from the South

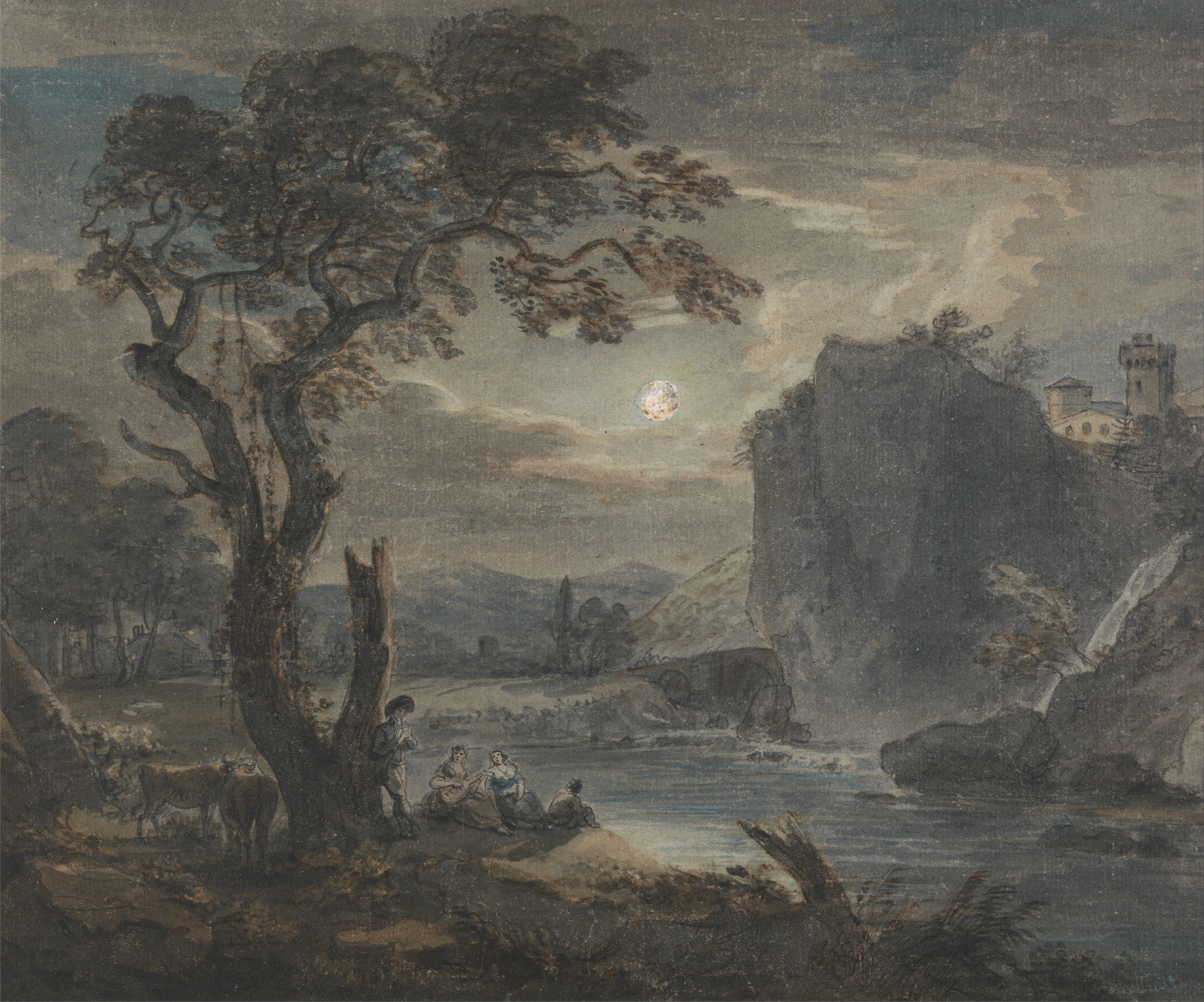
Music by Moonlight

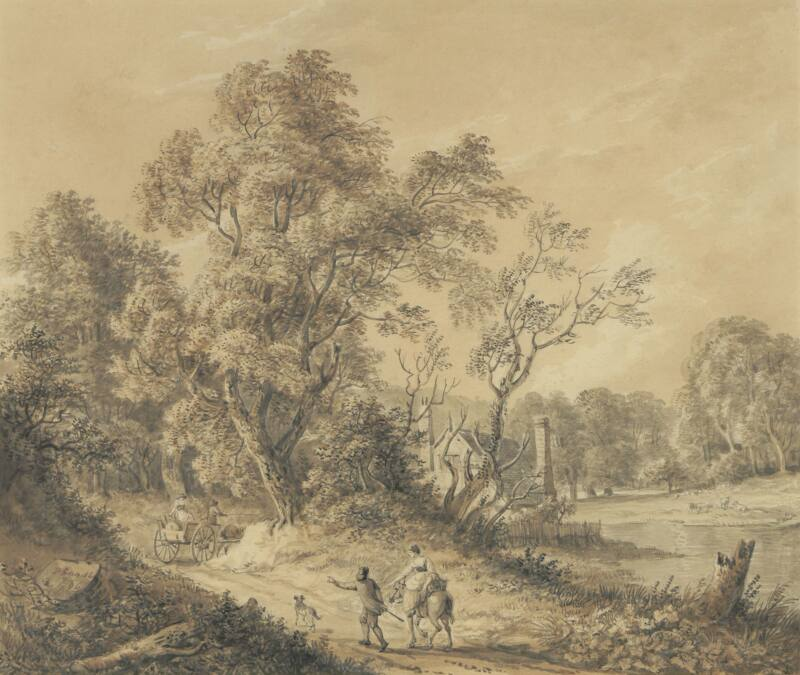
Landscape - ABDAG003883

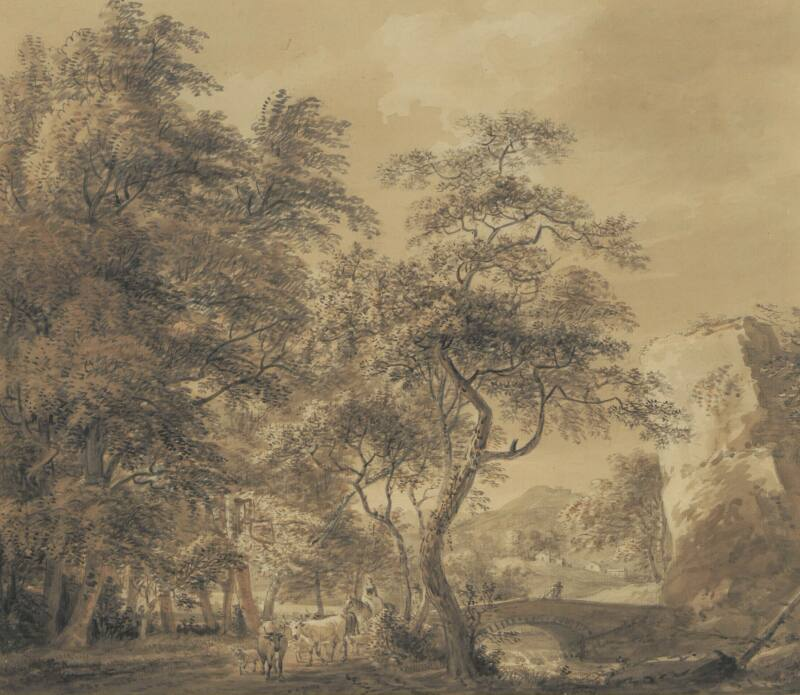
Landscape - ABDAG003884

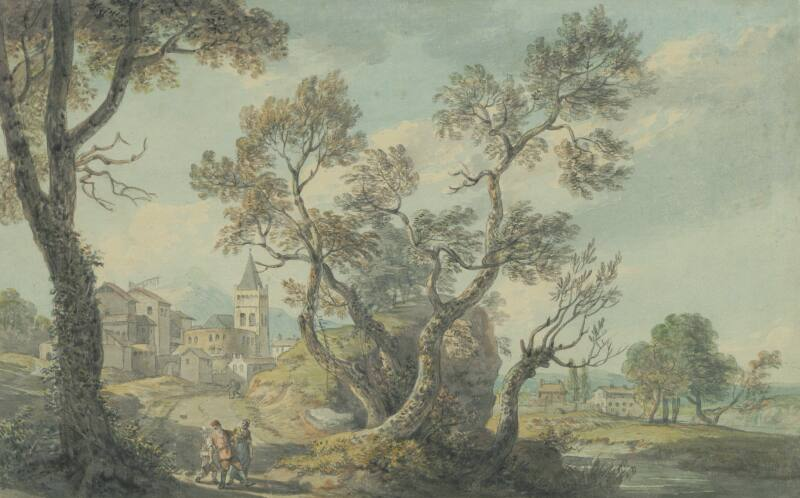
Landscape - ABDAG003885

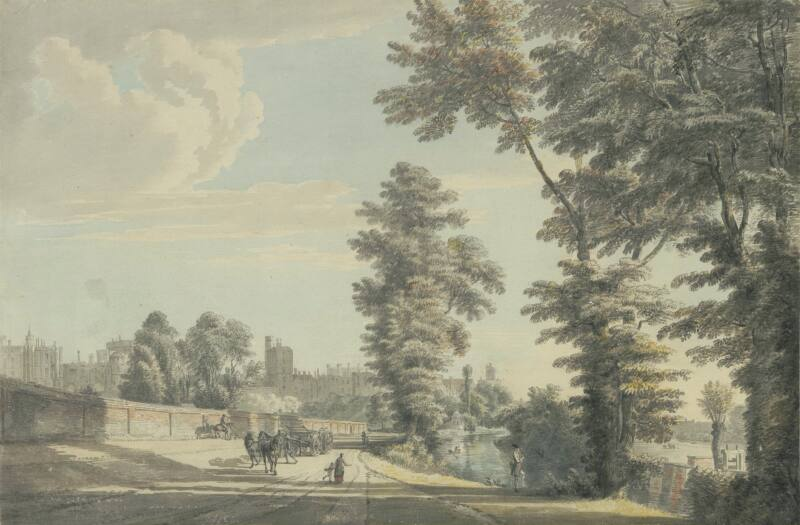
Windsor Castle - ABDAG003887

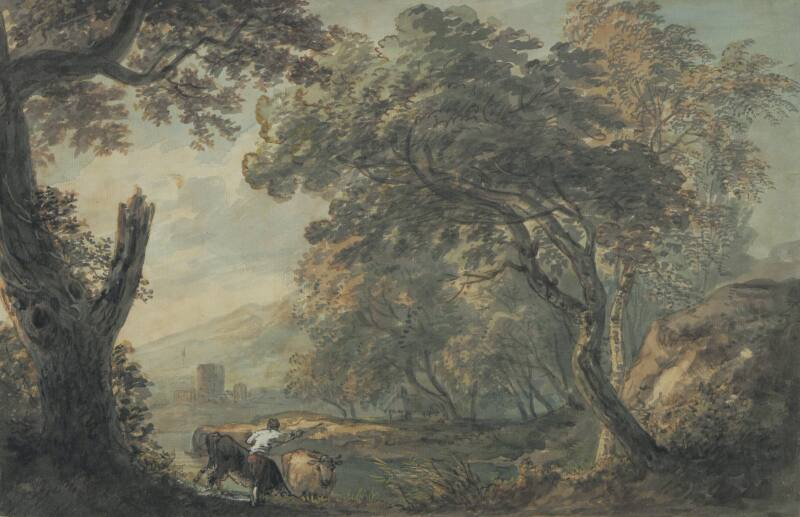
Landscape with Cattle - ABDAG003890
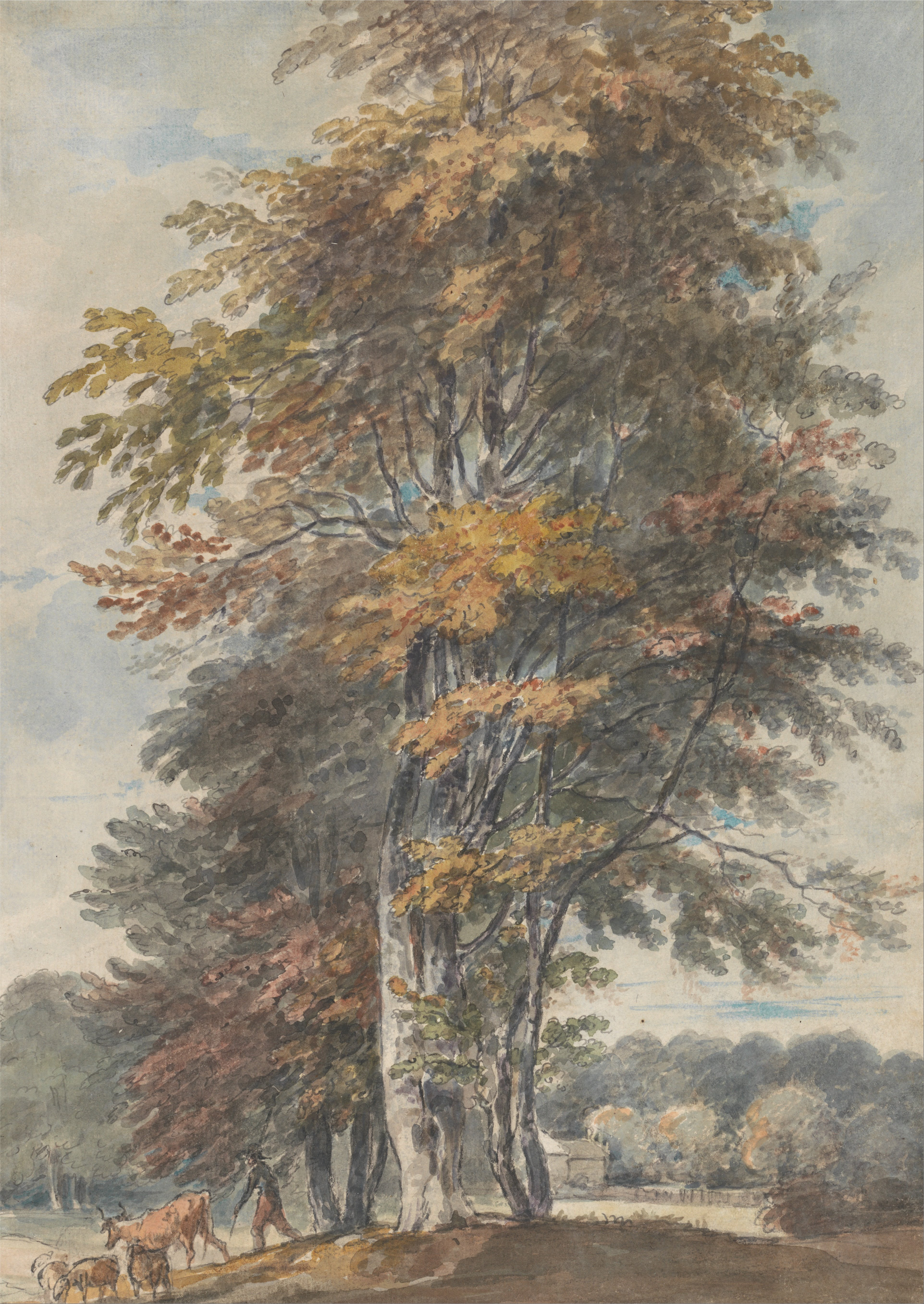
Landscape with beech trees and man driving cattle and sheep

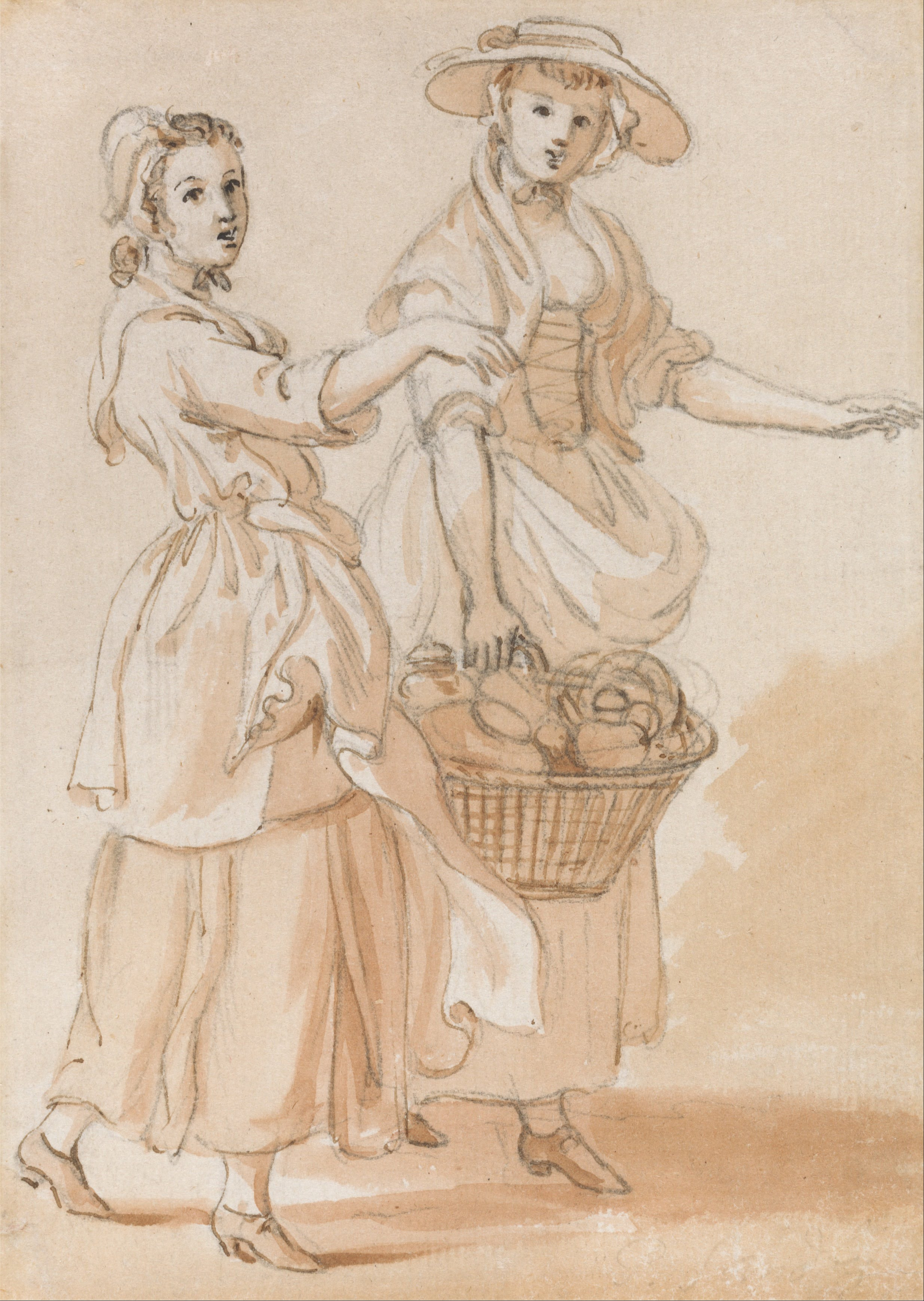
Two Girls Carrying a Basket

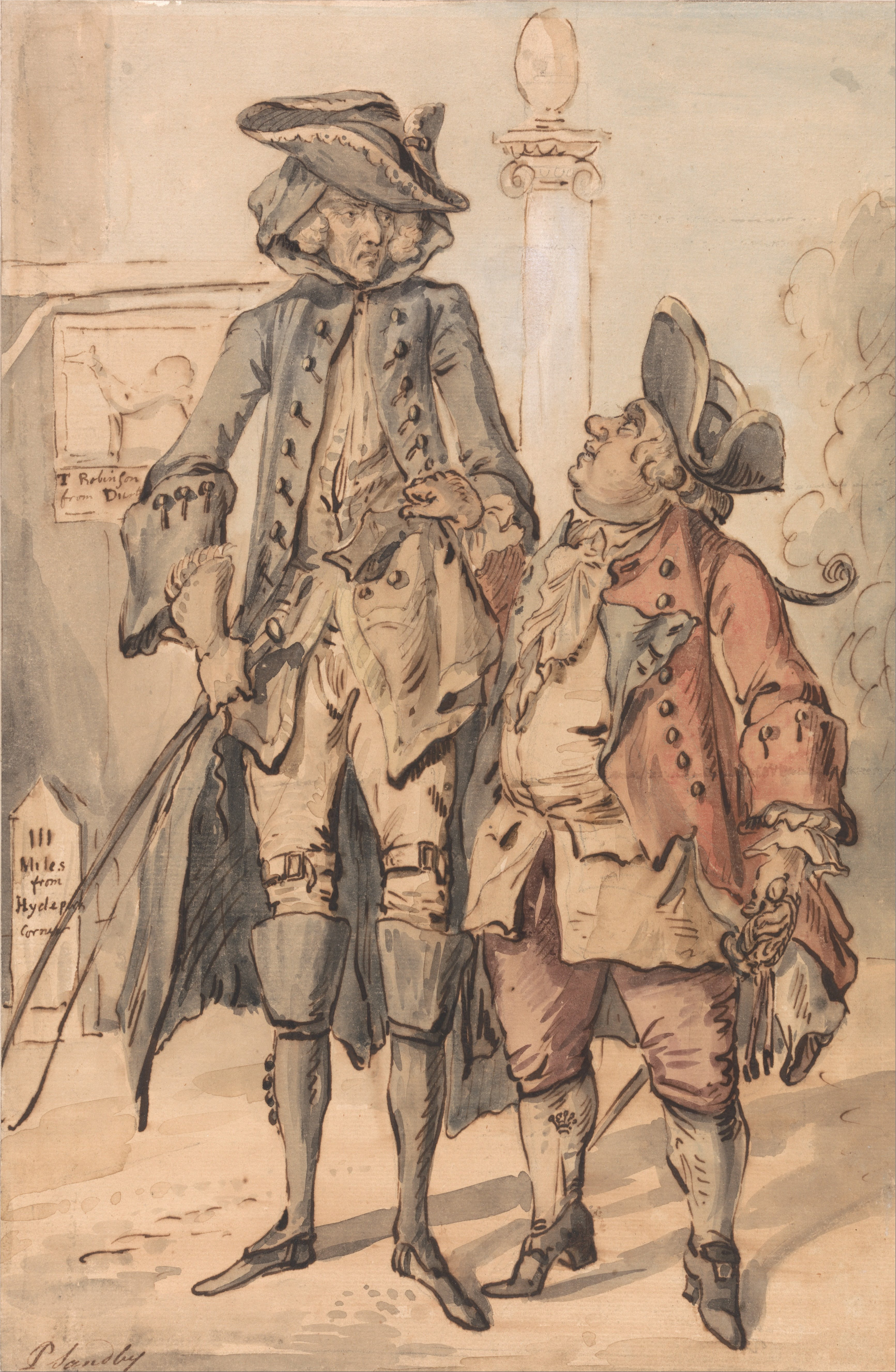
Caricature of George Bubb Dodington and Sir Thomas Robinson

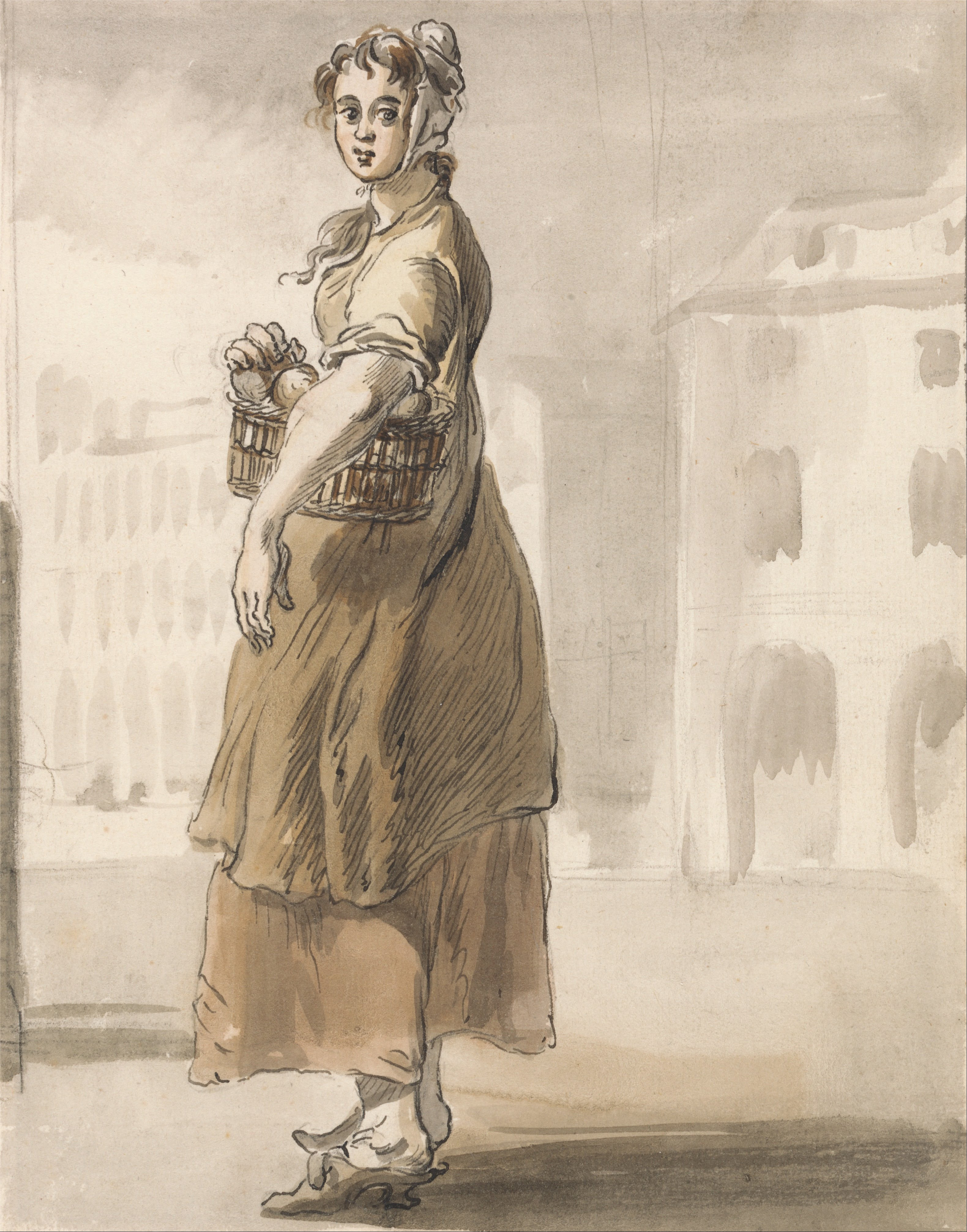
London Cries- A Girl with a Basket of Oranges

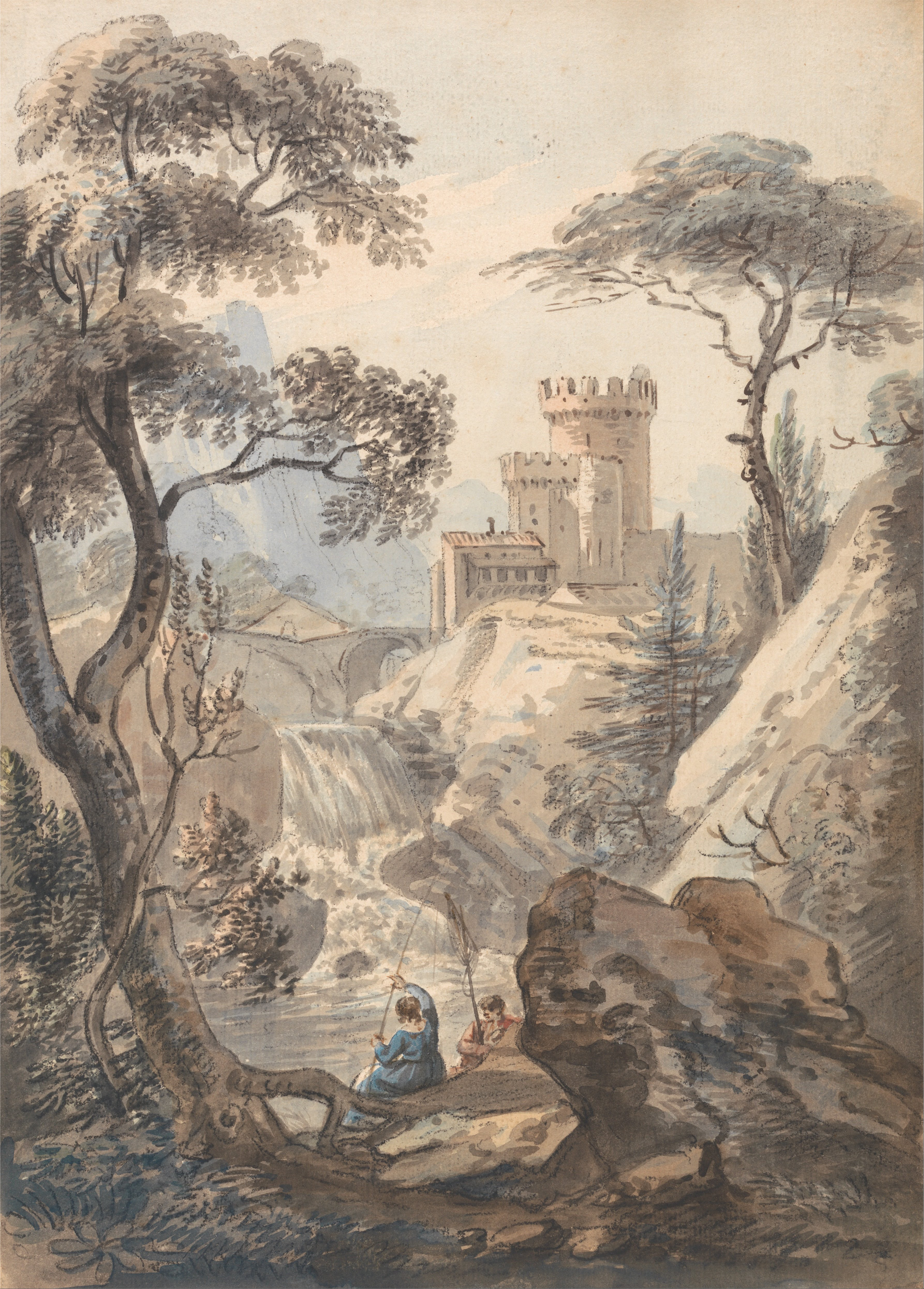
Italian Landscape with Castle, Cascade and Anglers

== See also ==
- English school of painting
