= List of office holders of the Duchy of Cornwall =

Note: Some of these offices were continued from the Earldom of Cornwall.

== Offices ==
=== Lord Steward and Lord Warden of the Stannaries in Cornwall and Devon ===
- See Lord Warden of the Stannaries

=== Vice-Admiral of Cornwall ===
- See List of Vice-Admirals of Cornwall

=== High Sheriff of Cornwall ===
- See High Sheriff of Cornwall

=== Chancellor and Keeper of the Great Seal (1476–1867?) ===
- 1476 Sir William Allington
- 1490 John Arundell, Bishop of Coventry and Lichfield
- 1502 Robert Frost
- ? John Morton, Archbishop of Canterbury
- 1610?–12? Sir Henry Hobart, 1st Baronet
- 1616?–17 Sir Francis Bacon
- 1617–? Sir Henry Hobart, 1st Baronet
- 17? –17? Nicholas Lechmere, 1st Baron Lechmere
- 1729–40 Alexander Denton
- 1740–51: Sir Thomas Bootle
- vacant
- 1802 Thomas Erskine
- 1806–15 William Adam
- 1816–18? John Leach
- 1843–67? Thomas Pemberton Leigh

=== Keeper of the Privy Seal (1846?–1933) ===
- 1846? Sir William Gibson-Craig, Bt
- 1852 Richard Temple-Grenville, 3rd Duke of Buckingham and Chandos
- 1853 Lord Alfred Hervey
- 1855 Charles Monck, 4th Viscount Monck
- 1858 Henry Brand, 1st Viscount Hampden
- 1858 Henry Whitmore
- 1859 Sir William Alexander, 3rd Baronet
- 1863 Sir William Dunbar, 7th Baronet
- 1865 Herbert William Fisher
- 1870 Thomas Coke, 2nd Earl of Leicester
- 1901–06 John Spencer, 5th Earl Spencer
- 1907 William Edgcumbe, 4th Earl of Mount Edgcumbe
- 1913–33 Charles Hepburn-Stuart-Forbes-Trefusis, 21st Baron Clinton
- see Lord Warden of the Stannaries since 1933

=== Receiver-General (1400–present) ===
- 1400 John Waterton
- 1413 John Willecotes
- 1422 John Copleston Jnr
- 1422 Thomas Congreve
- 1423 Lewis John
- 1433 Robert Whittingham
- 1439 Thomas Gloucester
- 1444 John Brecknock
- 1456 Robert Whittingham
- 1461 William, Lord Hastings
- 1473 Anthony Woodville, 2nd Earl Rivers
- 1483 Sir John Sapcotes
- 1485 Sir Robert Willoughby (later 1st Lord Willoughby de Broke)
- 1503 Sir Richard Nanfan
- 1507 Sir John Arundell
- 1533 Sir Thomas Arundell
- 1553 Sir Henry Gates
- 1553 Sir Edward Waldegrave
- 1553 John Coswarth
- 1574 Thomas Cosoworth
- 1586 Sir Francis Godolphin
- 1604 Sir Richard Smith
- 1618 Thomas Smyth
- 1637 Sir David Cunningham
- 1638 Robert Napier of Punknoll
- 1643 Richard Nicholl
- 1646 Arthur Upton
- 1650 George Crompton
- 1650 Gabriel Tailor
- 1709–12 Robert Corker
- 1715–20 Edward Eliot
- 1720–31 Robert Corker
- 1731–36 Edward Penrose of Penrose Law Suite 1749
- bef. 1740–48? Richard Eliot
- 1751 Edward Craggs-Eliot, 1st Baron Eliot
- 1804 Richard Brinsley Sheridan
- 1807 Gerard Lake, 1st Viscount Lake
- 1808 Richard Brinsley Sheridan
- 1816 Sir John McMahon, 1st Baronet
- 1817 Lord William Gordon
- 1823 Sir William Knighton, Bt
- 1830? Sir Henry Wheatley, Bt
- 1849–62 Office abolished.
- 1862 Sir Charles Beaumont Phipps
- 1866 Sir Thomas Myddleton-Biddulph
- 1878 Sir William Thomas Knollys
- 1883 Sir John Rose, 1st Baronet
- 1888 Sir Robert Kingscote
- 1908 John Baring, 2nd Baron Revelstoke
- 1929–36 Sir Edward Peacock
- 1961–73 The Lord Ashburton
- 1974 Sir John Baring (later Lord Ashburton)
- 1990 Simon Cairns, 6th Earl Cairns
- 2000 James Leigh-Pemberton
- 2022 Edward Harley

=== Attorney-General (1457–present) ===
- 1457 Thomas Throckmorton
- 1472 Sir William Allington
- 1477 John Twynho
- 1490 John Mordaunt
- 1511 William Esyngton
- 1515 William Ruddall
- 1515 Sir Robert Southwell
- 1529 John Baldewyn
- 1532 Sir Richard Riche
- 1532 John Cocke
- 1561 John Penne
- 1567? Stephen Brente
- 1599? Thomas Harrison
- 1601 Hannibal Vivian
- 1603 Gilbert Mitchell
- 1604 Thomas Fleetwood
- 1605 Thomas Stephens
- 1615 Sir John Walter
- 1632? William Noye
- 1634 Sir John Bankes
- 1635 Sir Richard Lane
- 1643 Sir Robert Holborne
- 1648? Francis Buller
- 1698 Francis Pengelly
- 1714 Spencer Cowper
- 1728 William Lee
- 1730 William Fortescue
- 1736 Robert Pauncefort
- 1748 Henry Bathurst
- 1754 Robert Henley (later Earl of Northington)
- 1756 Charles Pratt (later Earl Camden)
- 1783 Thomas Erskine (later Lord Erskine)
- 1793 Robert Graham
- 1800 Vicary Gibbs
- 1805 William Adam
- 1806 William Garrow
- 1812 Joseph Jekyll
- 1816 William Draper Best
- 1819 Charles Warren
- 1841 Thomas Pemberton (later Lord Kingsdown)
- 1843 The Hon. John Chetwynd-Talbot
- 1852 Sir Edward Smirke
- 1863 Sir William Alexander, Bt
- 1873 George Loch
- 1877 Alfred Henry Thesiger
- 1877 Sir Charles Hall
- 1892 Sir Henry James (later Lord James of Hereford)
- 1895 Charles Cripps (later Lord Parmoor)
- 1914 George Cave (later Lord Cave)
- 1915 Henry Duke (later Lord Merrivale)
- 1920 Sir Douglas Hogg (later Viscount Hailsham)
- 1923 Anthony Hawke
- 1928 Geoffrey Lawrence (later Lord Trevethin and Oaksey)
- 1932 Walter Monckton (later Lord Monckton of Brenchley)
- 1951–60: Charles Russell (later Lord Russell of Killowen)
- 1960 Sir Joseph Molony
- 1969 Anthony Lloyd
- 1978 Andrew Morritt
- 1988 Robert Carnwath
- 1994 Sir Jeremy Sullivan
- 1998 Nicholas Underhill
- 2006 Jonathan Crow
- 2020 Sharif Shivji

=== Surveyor-General (1747–1849) ===
- 1729–38 Richard Eliot
- 1747 Charles Calvert, 5th Baron Baltimore
- 1751 Sir Edward Bayntun-Rolt, 1st Baronet
- 1794 Sir John Morshead, Bt
- 1808–29 Benjamin Tucker
- 1833 Philip Sidney, 1st Baron De L'Isle and Dudley
- 1849 James Robert Gardiner

=== Keeper of the Records (1843–present) ===
- 1843–49 James Robert Gardiner
- ?–1873 Joshua Wigley Bateman
- 1873 George Wilmshurst
- 1886 Sir Maurice Holzmann
- 1908 Sir Walter Peacock
- 1930 Major Hilgrove McCormick
- 1936–54 Sir Clive Burn
- ?–1972 Sir Patrick Kingsley
- 1972 Francis Anthony Gray
- 1981 John Walter Yeoman Higgs
- 1987 Sir David Landale
- 1993 Sir John James
- 1997 Sir Walter Ross
- 2013 Alastair Martin
- 2024 William Bax

=== Auditor (1509–1993) ===
- 1509 Hugh Molyneux
- 1543? Robert Hennage
- 1543 Thomas Mildmay
- 1547 Walter Mildmay
- 1567 John Conyers
- 1574? William Neale
- 1590? Robert Paddon
- 1602 Nathaniel Fulwer
- 1603 Richard Connock
- 1622 Thomas Gewen
- 1633 John Downes
- 1645 William Loving
- 1661 William Harbord
- 1692 Philip Bertie
- 1704–23? Albemarle Bertie
- 1735–51 Charles Montagu
- 1751–67 William Trevanion
- 1768 Richard Hussey
- 1770 John Buller
- 1783 Henry Lyte
- 1791 John Willett Payne
- 1796 Thomas Tyrwhitt
- 1803 Sir John McMahon, 1st Baronet
- 1816 Benjamin Bloomfield
- 1817 Sir William Knighton, 1st Baronet
- 1823–41 George Harrison
- 1843 Edward White
- 1851 Sir William Anderson
- 1891 Lesley Probyn
- 1916–? Laurence Halsey
- 1957–? Edmund Parker
- 1971–93 Jeffery Bowman

=== Solicitor-General (1714–present) ===
- 1714 John Fortescue Aland
- 1715 Laurence Carter
- 1717 Charles Talbot
- 1726 John Finch
- 1729 William Fortescue
- 1730 Robert Pauncefort
- 1736 Richard Hollings
- 1741 Alexander Hume Campbell
- 1746 Henry Bathurst
- 1748 Paul Joddrell
- 1751 Robert Henley
- 1754 Charles Yorke
- 1783 Sir Arthur Leary Piggott
- 1793 John Anstruther
- 1795 Vicary Gibbs
- 1800 Thomas Manners-Sutton
- 1802 William Adam
- 1805 Joseph Jekyll
- 1812 Samuel Shepherd
- 1813 William Draper Best
- 1816 William Harrison
- 1841? Edward Smirke
- 1908 Robert Ernest Tucker
- 1940 Sir Clive Burn
- 1954 Brian Stopford
- 1972 Joseph Frederick Burrell
- 1976 Henry Boyd-Carpenter
- 1994 James Furber

=== Cornwall Herald ===
- 1398-?: John Hilton, Harper

=== Chief Commissioner ===
- Francis Seymour-Conway, 3rd Marquess of Hertford

=== Havener (Keeper of the Havenary (Ports) of Cornwall and the Port of Plymouth, Devon) (1337–1617) ===
- 1337 Thomas FitzHenry
- 1373 Walter Bray
- 1376 Thomas Asshenden
- 1377–88 Richard Hampton
- 1386–95 John Slegh
- 1388–91 John Maudelyn
- 1391–5 William Skelton
- 1395 John Knyveton
- 1395 Thomas Galy
- 1397 Edward, Duke of Aumerle
- 1399 John Norbury
- 1404–7 John Snede
- 1411 John Clink
- 1415 Thomas Chaucer
- 1426 Robert Treage
- 1427 John Lawhier
- 1431 Thomas Treffry
- 1432 Thomas Est
- 1454 John Delabere
- 1455 Thomas Bodulgate (Joint)
- 1455 Geoffrey Kidwelly (Joint)
- 1461 Thomas Clemens (Joint)
- 1461 Richard Edgcumbe (Joint)
- 1461 Geoffrey Kidwelly (Joint)
- 1461 Nicholas Loure
- 1471 Sir Thomas Vaughan
- 1472 William Richmond
- 1477 Richard Holton
- 1483 Sir James Tyrell
- 1485 Robert Walshe
- 1486 John Monkeley
- ? Benedict Killegrew
- 1502 Thomas Elyot
- 1515 John Thomas
- 1516? Henry Pennage
- 1517 John Amodas
- 1549? William Reskymer
- 1552 Henry Killegrew
- 1553 John Cliff
- 1578? Peter Killigrew
- 1601? Joseph Killegrew
- 1616? Sir John Killigrew
- 1626? Robert Longdon
- 1617 William Roscarrock
- Thomas Gewen
- Sir William Morrice
- Sir William Morice, 1st Baronet
- 1867 Edmund Chase Marriott, Esq. (Havenor and Keeper of the Ports and Foreshores of the Duchy of Cornwall, in the counties of Cornwall and Devon)

=== Feodary (Escheator) in Cornwall and Devon (1403–1632) ===
- 1403 John Haweley Jnr
- 1437 Michael Power
- 1451 Edward Ellesmere
- 1460 Avery Cornburgh
- 1473 Sir John Fogge and John Fogge (son)
- 1484 Thomas Sapcotes
- 1485 Sir Richard Edgcumbe
- 1489 Peter Edgcumbe
- 1502 Sir Peter Edgcumbe (joint)
- 1502–6 Roger Holland (joint)
- 1539 Sir Hugh Trevanyon
- 1551 Hugh Trevanyon
- 1565–6 Richard Strode
- 1574 Edward Trevanyon
- 1576 Henry Carye
- 1581? William Killigrew
- 1604 Richard Billing
- 1607 John Sorrell
- 1626? Robert Langdon
- 1632? Stephen Smyth
- ? Henry Carew

=== President of the Council ===
- Albert, Prince Consort

== Bibliography ==
For lists of the Duchy's officers (1337–1650):

- Campbell, S. (1962), "The Haveners of the medieval Dukes of Cornwall and the organisation of the Duchy ports", Journal of the Royal Institution of Cornwall, New Series, 4: 113–44, ISSN 0968-5936.
- Haslam, G. (1980), An Administrative Study of the Duchy of Cornwall, 1500–1650, PhD thesis, Louisiana State University, pp. 303–05.
- Kowaleski, M., ed. (2001), The Haveners' Accounts of the Earldom and Duchy of Cornwall, 1287–1346, New Series, vol. 44, Devon and Cornwall Record Society, ISBN 978-0901853448.
- Stansfield-Cudworth, R.E. (2013), "The Duchy of Cornwall and the Wars of the Roses: Patronage, Politics, and Power, 1453–1502", Cornish Studies, 2nd Series, 21: 104–50, doi:10.1386/CORN.21.1.104_1, ISSN 0308-2679.
