= Mary Smirke =

English painter

Mary Smirke (22 June 1779 – 14 September 1853) was an English artist and translator.

== Biography ==
Smirke was one of the eight children born to the painter and illustrator Robert Smirke and his wife Elizabeth, who died in 1825. Their other children included the architects Sir Robert Smirke and Sydney Smirke, the draughtsman Richard Smirke and the lawyer and archaeologist Sir Edward Smirke.

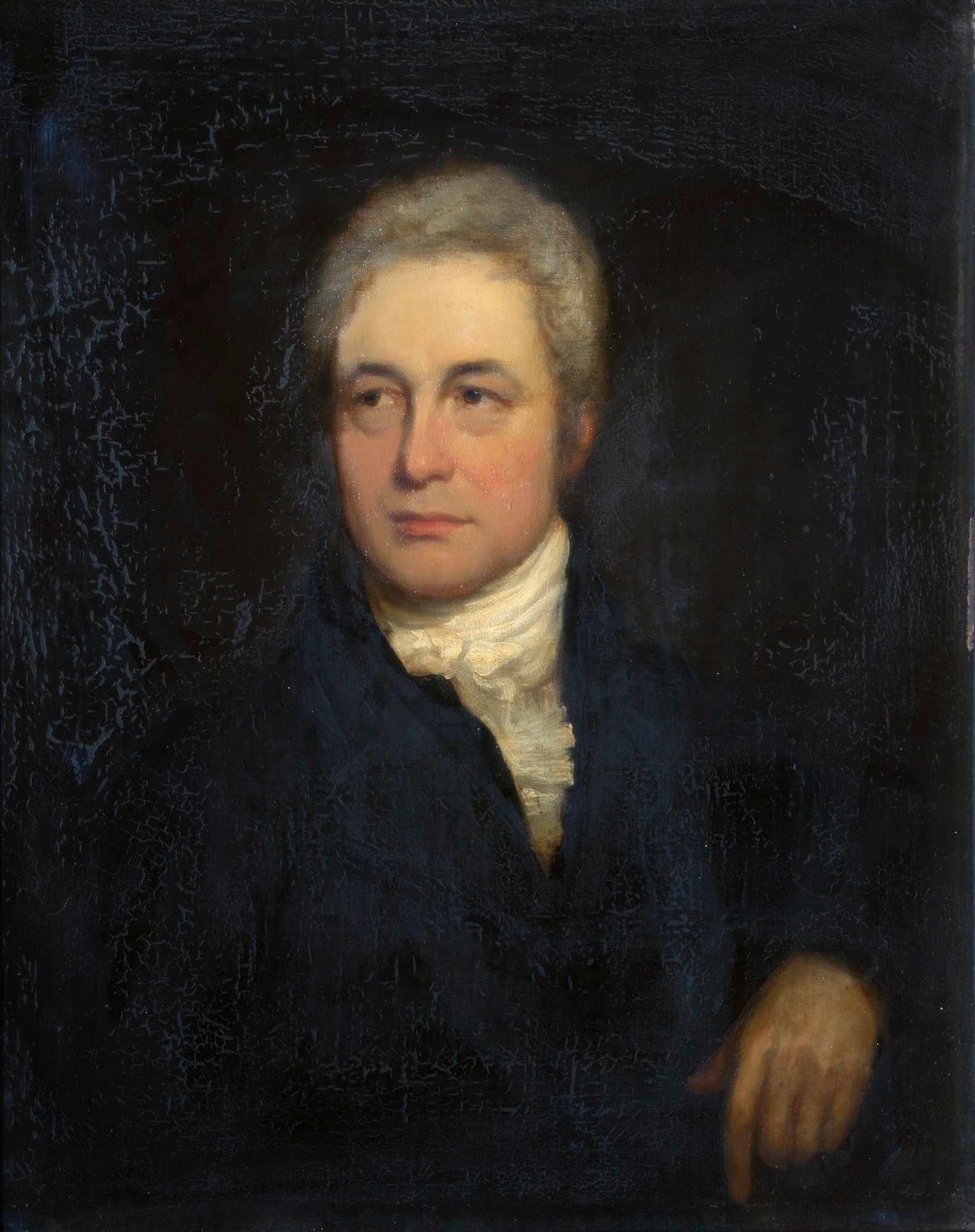
Robert Smirke by Mary Smirke - now in the Royal Academy collection

Mary Smirke attended school in Rickmansworth and received her artistic training from her father. She was employed as a painter and copyist by Nathaniel Dance-Holland and Sir Thomas Lawrence and in due course became a well-regarded landscape painter. Between 1809 and 1814 she exhibited six paintings at the Royal Academy in London. These paintings included View of Arundel Castle and Cottege near Blackheath.

Smirke was also a translator and in 1818 her English translation of Don Quixote, with illustrations by her father, was published. She published two volumes of poetry, in 1843 and 1853, as Illustrated Translations from the German which she also illustrated with pen and ink drawings. Smirke's portrait of her father is held by the Royal Academy in London. The portrait was copied and engraved by John Jackson and Charles Picart and examples of that engraving are held by the National Portrait Gallery while both the Victoria and Albert Museum and the Royal Institute of British Architects hold examples of her drawings. The Yale Center for British Art holds an 1823 painting by Smirke.
