= Sancton Wood =

English architect

- Born: 27 April 1814; Hackney, London
- Died: 18 April 1886 (aged 71)
- Occupation: Architect
- Buildings: Heuston railway station

Sancton Wood (27 April 1814 – 18 April 1886) was an English architect and surveyor, known for his work on railway buildings.

== Life and family ==
Sancton Wood was born on 27 April 1814 in Nursery Place, Hackney Terrace, Hackney, London. He was the son of John Wood and Harriet Russell. He had 5 sisters. Wood's birth was registered in the Protestant dissenters’ birth registry. His mother was a niece of the painter, Richard Smirke. His paternal family were cotton merchants originally from Cumberland. He was named Sancton after his paternal uncle by marriage, Philip Sancton, a London merchant. He attended a private school in Devon, and later a school run by T. W. Hill at Hazelwood, Birmingham.

On 11 March 1839, Wood married Elizabeth Sarah Simson (1810–1878), at Dedham, Essex. The couple had two sons, Herbert Sancton Wood (1844–1883) and William Winder Wood (1846–1876). The family moved to 11 Putney Hill, London in 1850, a house which Wood designed. He died there on 18 April 1886, and was buried with his wife and sons at Putney Lower Common cemetery.

== Career ==
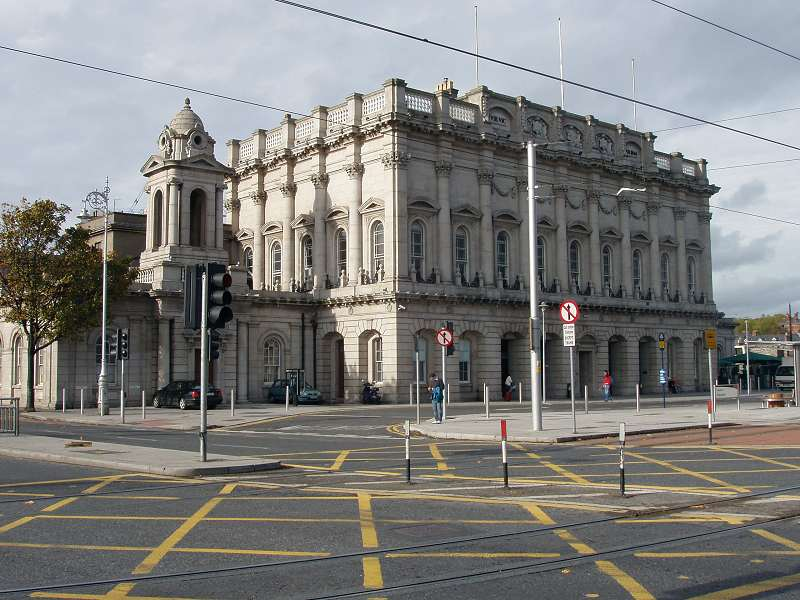
Dublin's Heuston Station (originally named Kingsbridge Station), designed by Wood, opening in 1846.

Wood obtained work in the office of his cousin, the architect Robert Smirke, as a pupil. He later worked for Robert's brother, Sydney Smirke. In these positions he was trained in classical architecture, which led to his early recognition. He set up his own practice in England and obtained work designing stations for the growing railway networks in Great Britain and Ireland. He also designed houses in London, including some at Lancaster Gate. He designed one of London's first train terminals in 1837, for Eastern Counties Railway at Shoreditch. His designs were constrained by budgets, but he was successful in a number of competitions, winning a prize of £100 for Ipswich station.

In 1845 he won the competition to design the Kingsbridge terminus and company offices, Dublin (now known as Heuston Station), winning against 65 other designs. His design for Blackburn station won Wood a £100 prize in 1846. Wood continued to work in Ireland for a number of years, designing stations between Dublin and Cork for Great Southern and Western, and on the Limerick Junction. He was also engaged to design a stand at the Curragh racecourse. Among the other stations Wood designed are those on Rugby and Stamford line (1846), and Syston and Peterborough route (1847).

In 1841, he was elected an associate of the Royal Institute of British Architects, and in 1848 he was elected an associate of the Institution of Civil Engineers and an associate of the Institution of Surveyors. He is credited with a number of churches, commercial buildings, estates, and schools in the London area, including Queen's Assurance Company office (1852), Hackney town hall (1864) and a terrace houses, Lancaster Gate (1857). He served as district surveyor for Putney and Roehampton, and from 1866 district surveyor for St Luke's, Chelsea, and was a member of the district surveyors examining board.

== Selected works ==
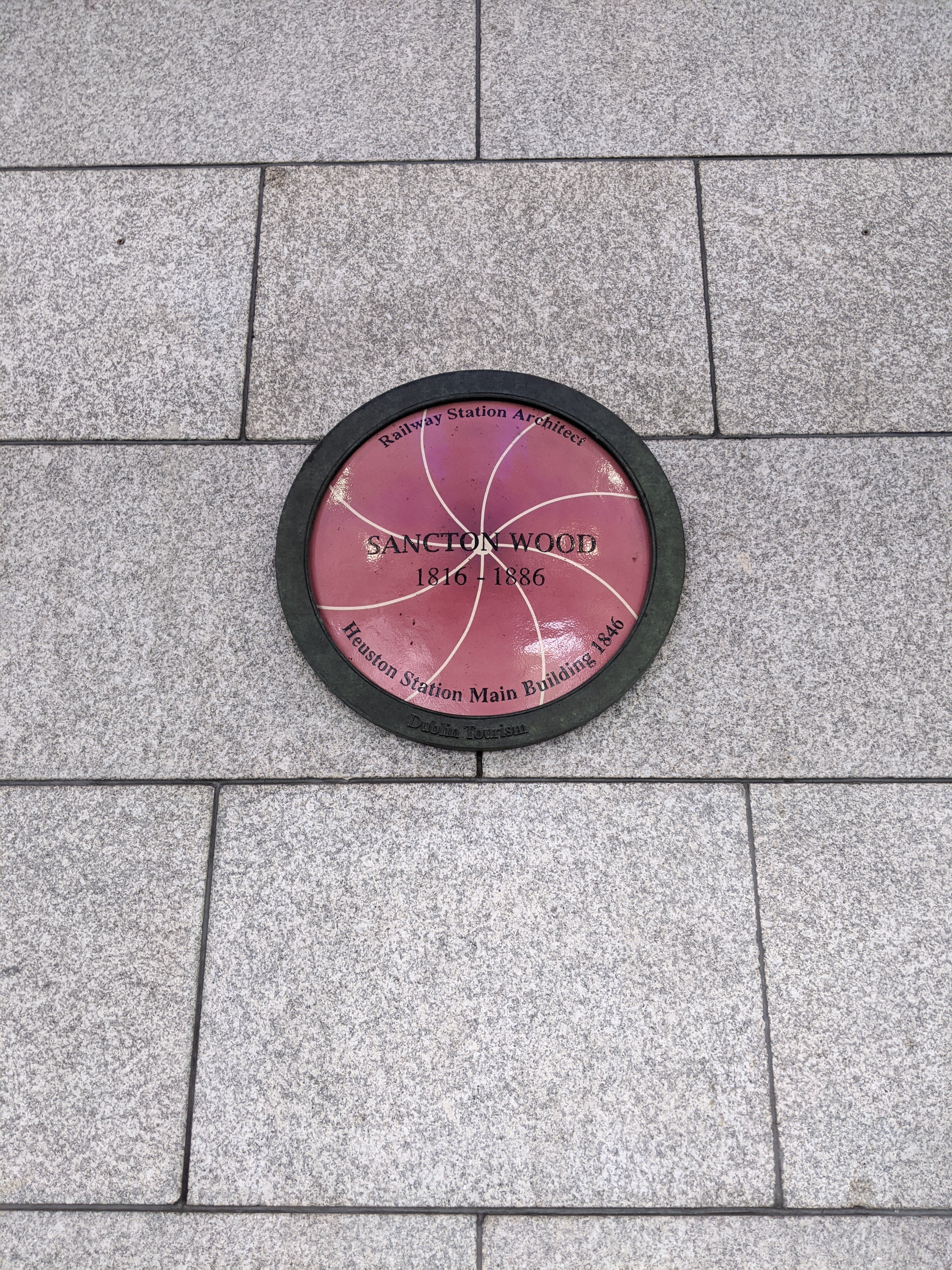
Plaque to Wood at Heuston Station

- Portlaoise railway station (1847)
- Thurles railway station (1848)
- Muine Bheag railway station (1850)
