= Robert Smirke =

Robert Smirke may refer to:

- Robert Smirke (painter) (1753–1845), English painter
- Robert Smirke (architect) (1780–1867), his son, English architect
