= Robert Smirke (painter) =

English painter

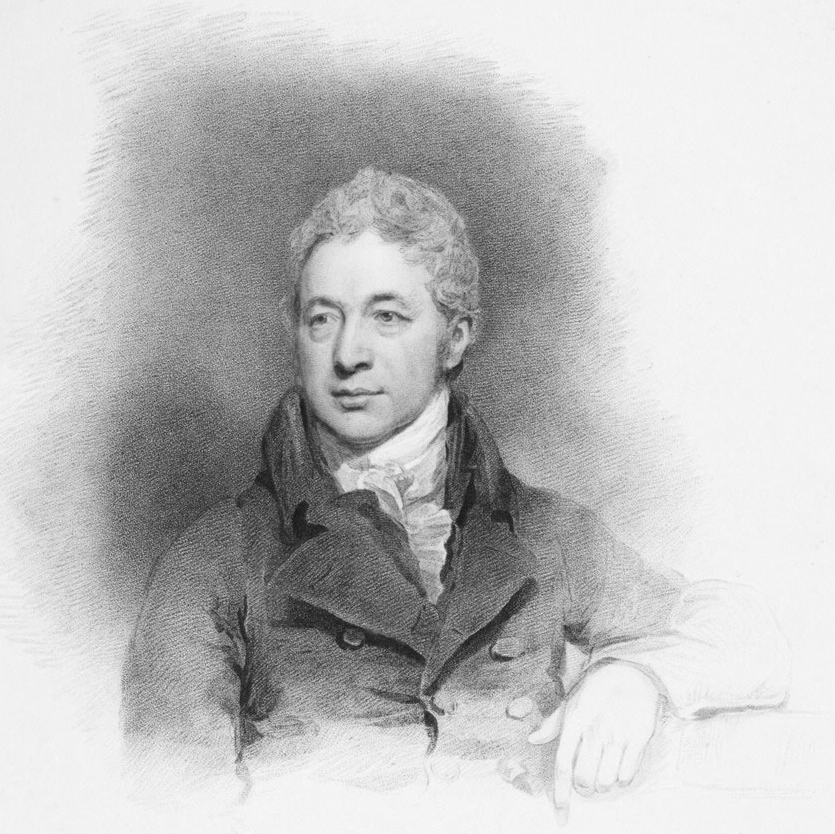
Robert Smirke, after a painting by Mary Smirke, engraved by Charles Picart, 1814

Robert Smirke RA (15 April 1753 – 5 January 1845) was an English painter and illustrator, specialising in small paintings showing subjects taken from literature. He was a member of the Royal Academy.

== Life ==
Smirke was born at Wigton near Carlisle, the son of a travelling artist. When he was twelve he was apprenticed to a heraldic painter in London, and at the age of twenty began to study at the Royal Academy Schools.

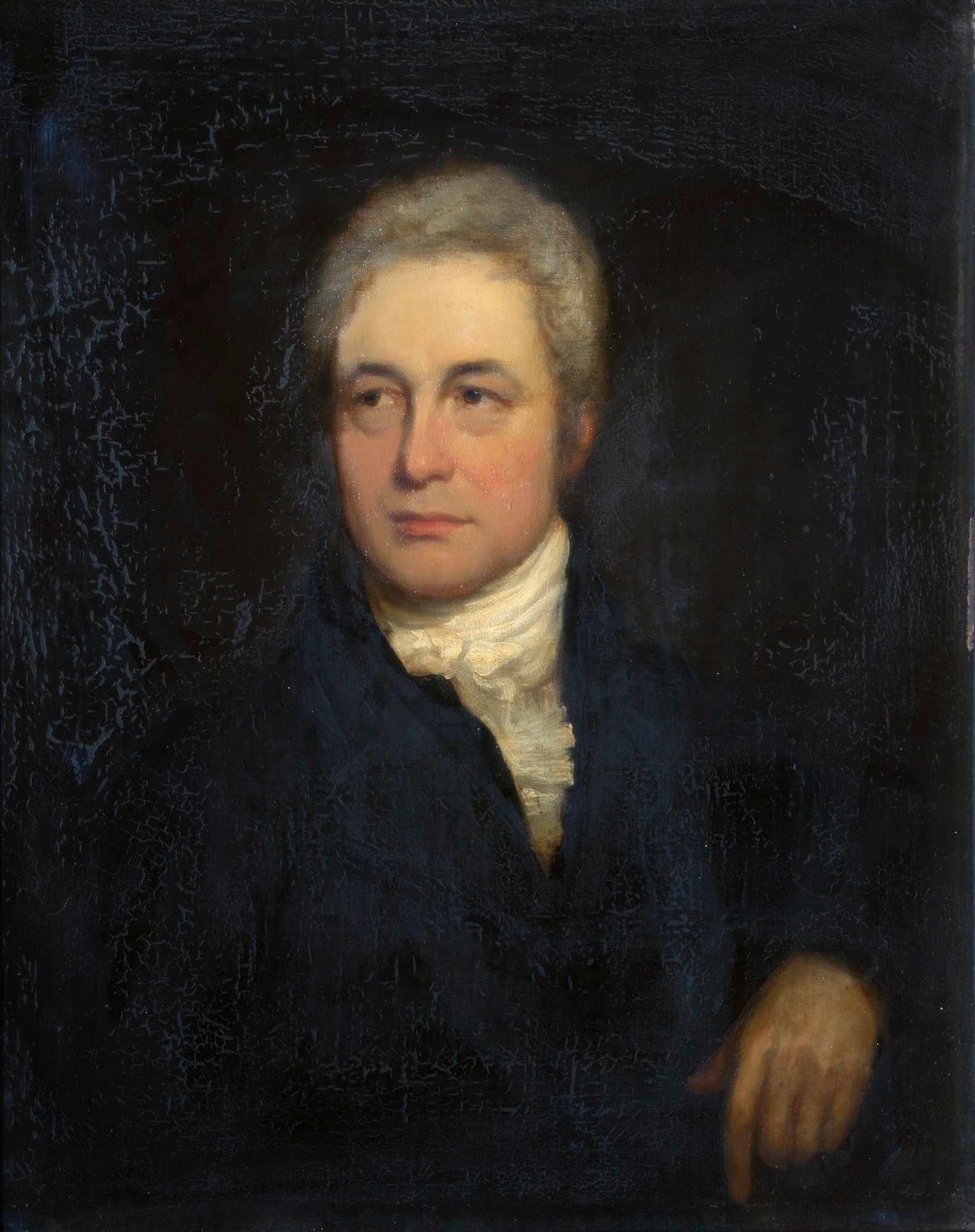
Robert Smirke by Mary Smirke – now in the Royal Academy

In 1775 he became a member of the Incorporated Society of Artists, where he exhibited five of his own works; he held two more exhibitions of his works there again in 1777 and 1778. In 1786 he exhibited Narcissus and The Lady and Sabrina (a subject from Milton's Comus) at the Royal Academy; these were followed by many works, usually small in size, illustrative of the English poets, especially James Thomson.

In 1791 Smirke was elected an associate of the Royal Academy, in which year he exhibited "The Widow". He became a full academician in 1793, when he painted as his diploma work Don Quixote and Sancho. His last contribution to the academy, entitled Infancy, appeared in 1813, but he continued to exhibit occasionally elsewhere until 1834.

In 1804 he was nominated to succeed Joseph Wilton as keeper to the Royal Academy, but George III refused to sanction the appointment on account of his revolutionary political opinions, and the appointment went instead to Henry Fuseli.

In 1815 the British Institution upset many British artists by a preface to the catalogue of their exhibition of Old Masters, The Catalogues Raisonnés, implying rather too strongly that British artists had a lot to learn from them. Smirke is generally accepted as the author in 1815–16 of a series of satirical "Catalogues Raisonnés", which savagely lampooned the great and the good of British art patronage. Of his sons, Richard Smirke (1778–1815) was a notable antiquarian artist. Robert and Sydney both became notable architects and were both elected members of the Royal Academy. His fourth son, Edward was a noted lawyer and antiquary. There is a portrait of Smirke by John Jackson taken from an original picture by Mary Smirke, engraved by Charles Picart. Sir William John Newton painted several miniatures of him.

Smirke died at 3 Osnaburgh Terrace, Regent's Park, London, on 5 January 1845, aged 92, and was buried in Kensal Green Cemetery.

== Works ==
Smirke's pictures were usually of small size and painted in monochrome, and so adapted for engraving. He designed illustrations for the Bible, The Picturesque Beauties of Shakespeare (1783), Johnson's Rasselas (1805), Gil Blas (1809), the Arabian Nights (1811), Adventures of Hunchback (1814), Don Quixote, (translated by his daughter, Mary Smirke, 1818), and various British poets, especially James Thomson. The Pedagogue, engraved by Joseph Goodyear for the Amulet of 1830, is typical. The Rivals was engraved by William Finden for the Keepsake of 1828; The Secret, by James Mitchell for the same annual in 1830; and The Love Letter was engraved by Alfred W. Warren for the Gem of 1830.

Smirke also painted some pictures for John Boydell's Shakespeare Gallery and for Bowyer's History of England. These works included Katharine and Petruchio, Juliet and the Nurse, Prince Henry and Falstaff, and The Seven Ages. A large commemorative plate, with fifteen medallion portraits, of The Victory of the Nile was engraved by John Landseer from his design. In the Guildhall Art Gallery was a picture by him representing Conjugal Affection, or Industry and Prudence, and a series of scenes from Don Quixote.

== Gallery ==
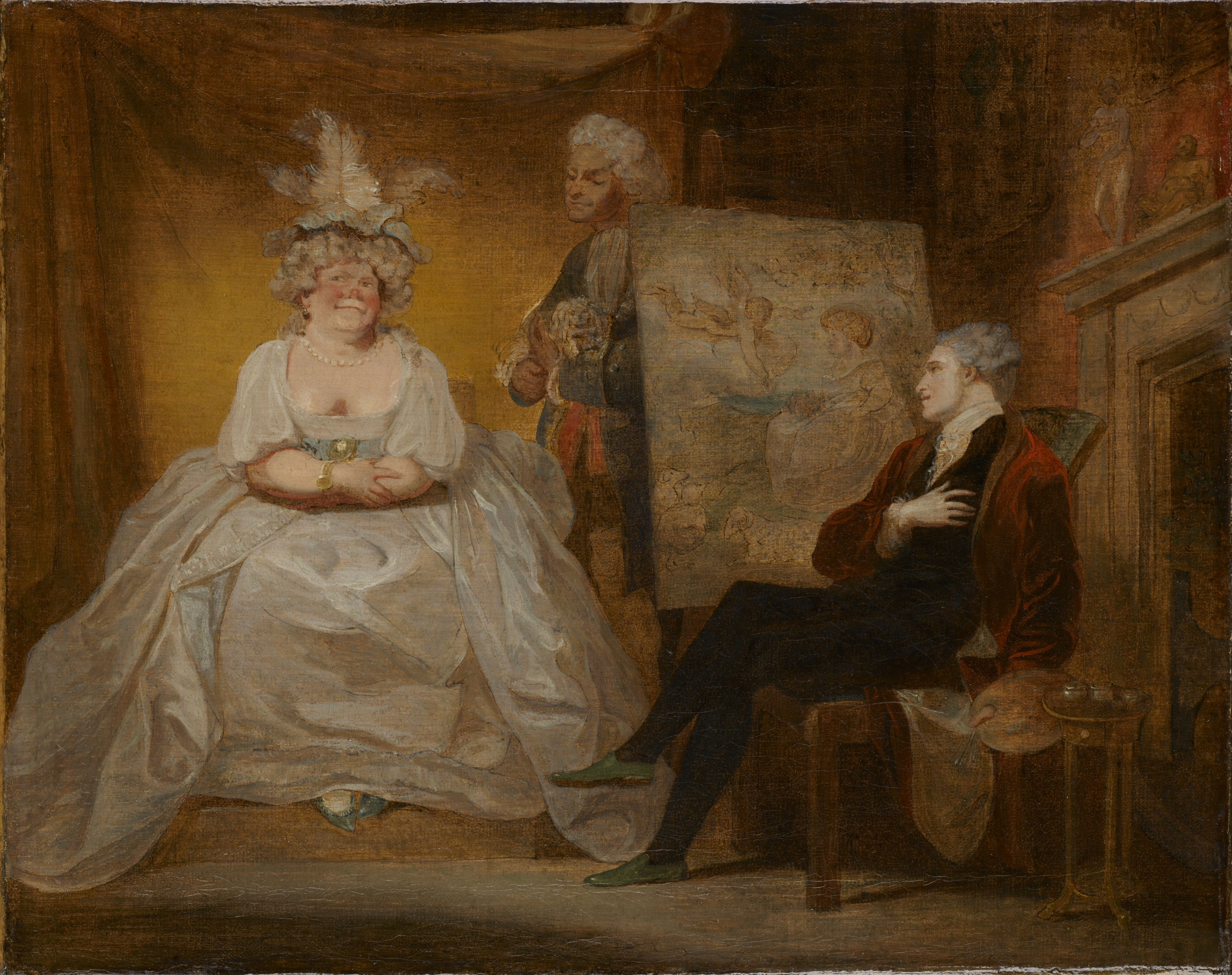
Scene from Samuel Foote's play "Taste", second half of 18th century

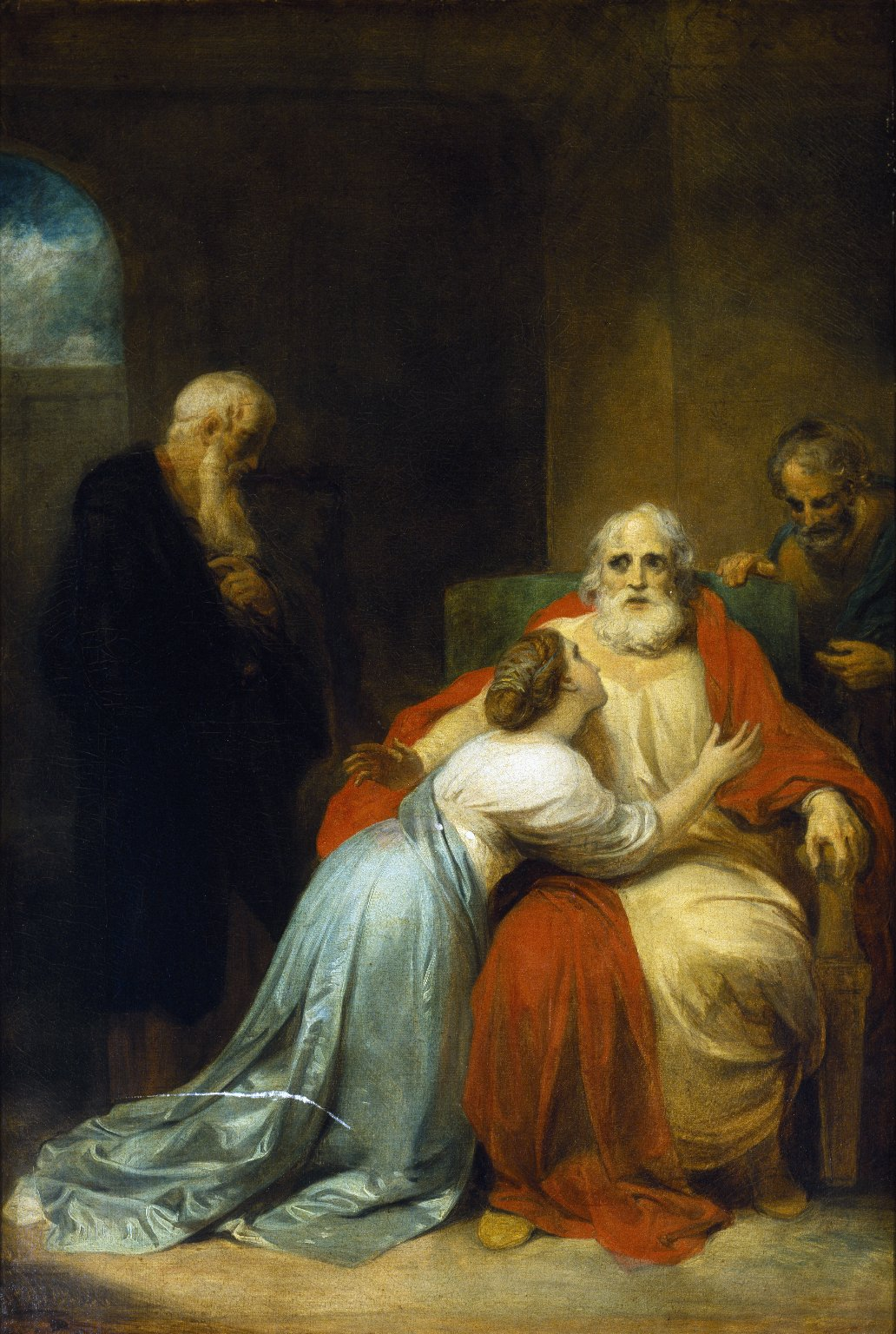
The Awakening of King Lear, c. 1792

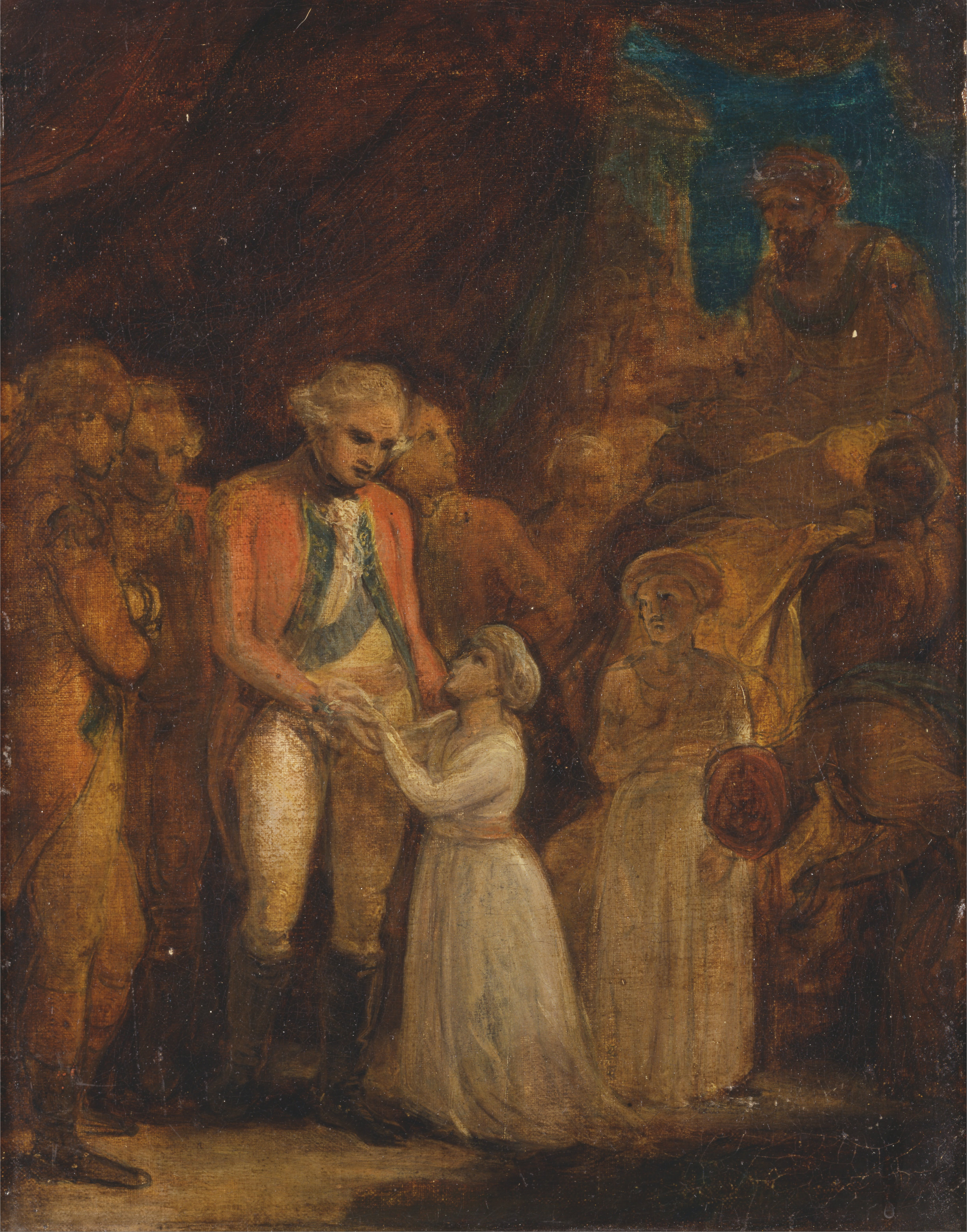
The Two Sons of Tipu Sahib, Sultan of Mysore, Being Handed over as Hostages to General Cornwallis, c. 1792

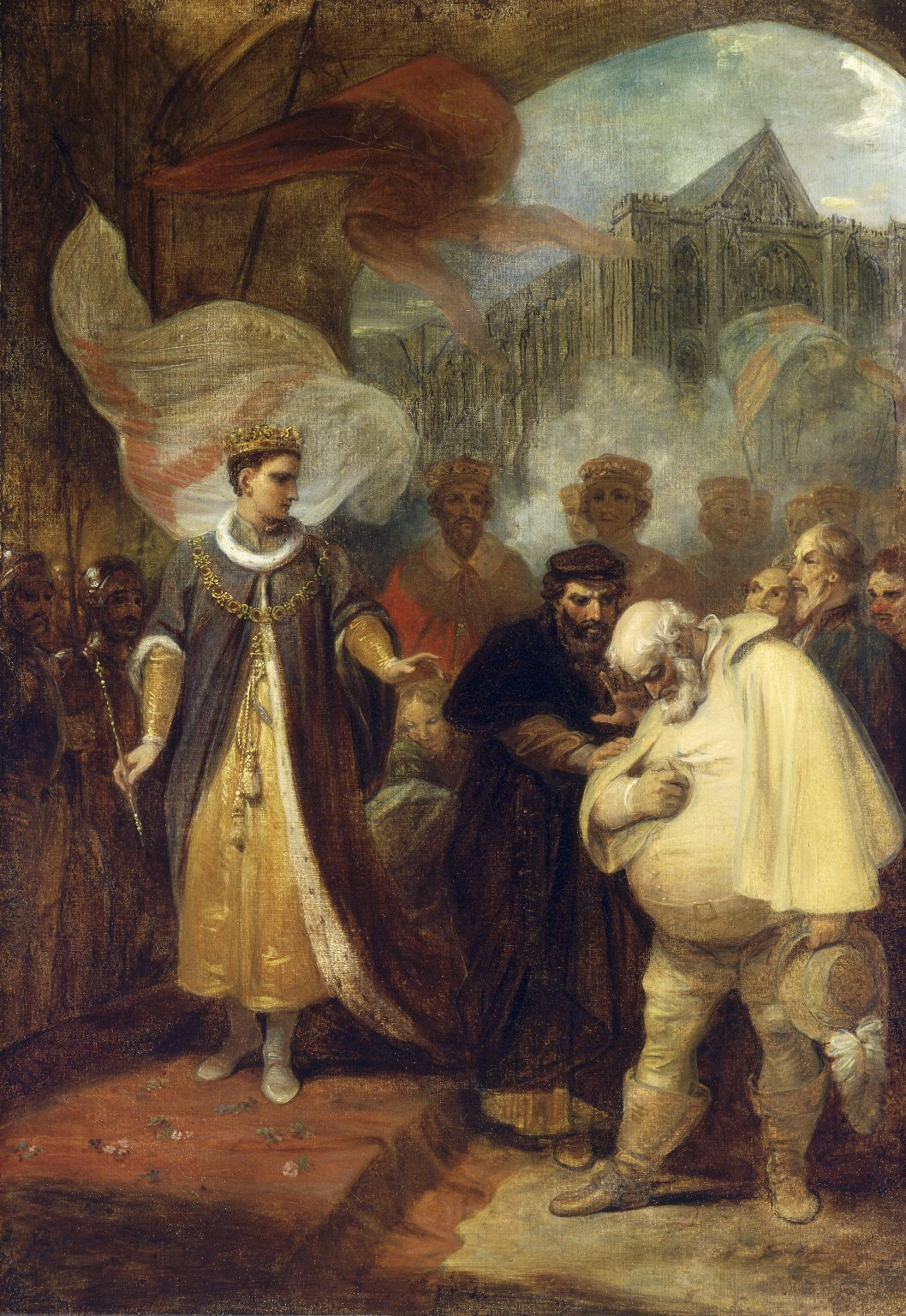
Falstaff rebuked, c. 1795

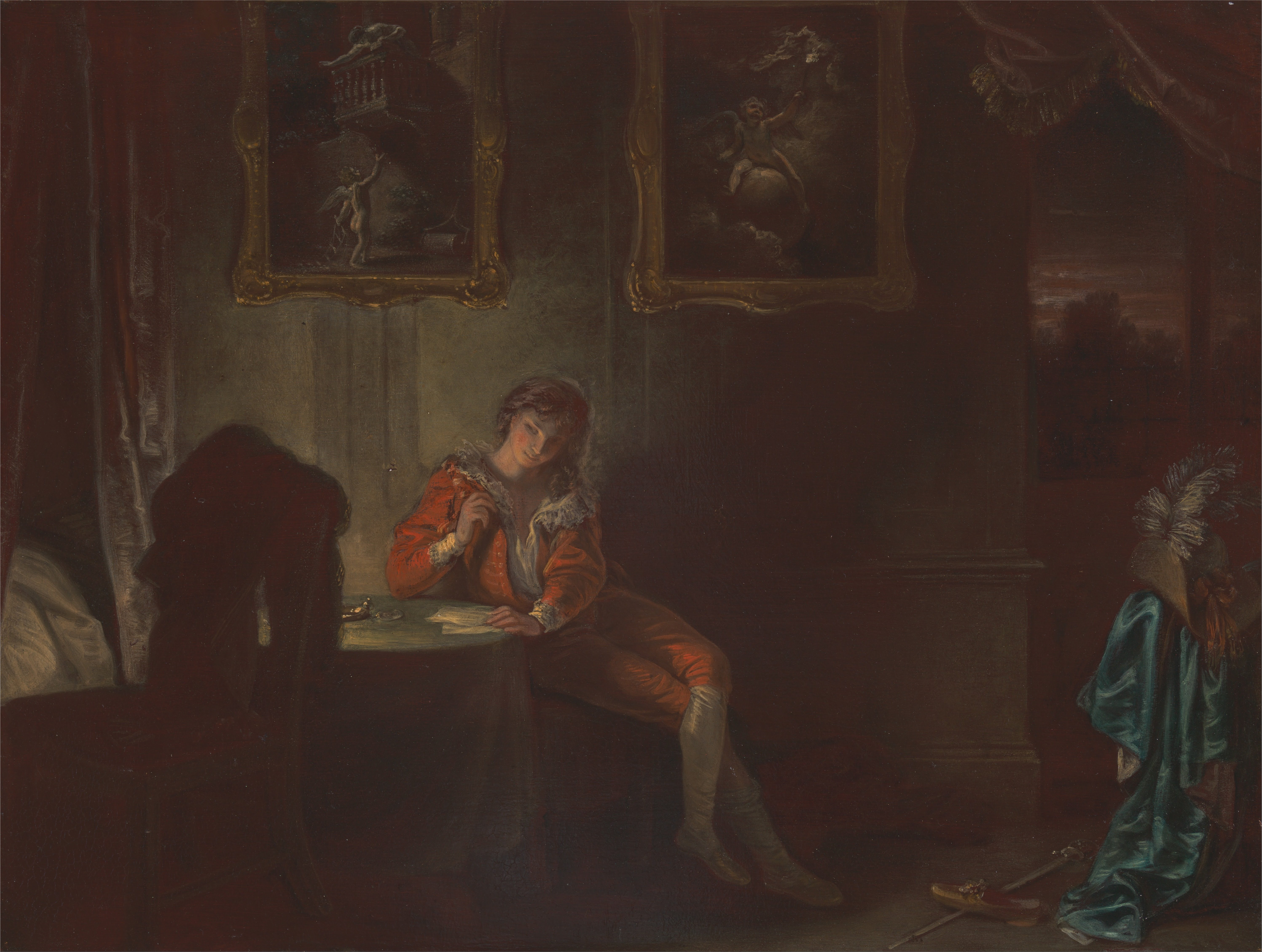
From the series The Seven Ages of Man, The Lover, from As You Like It, between 1798 and 1801

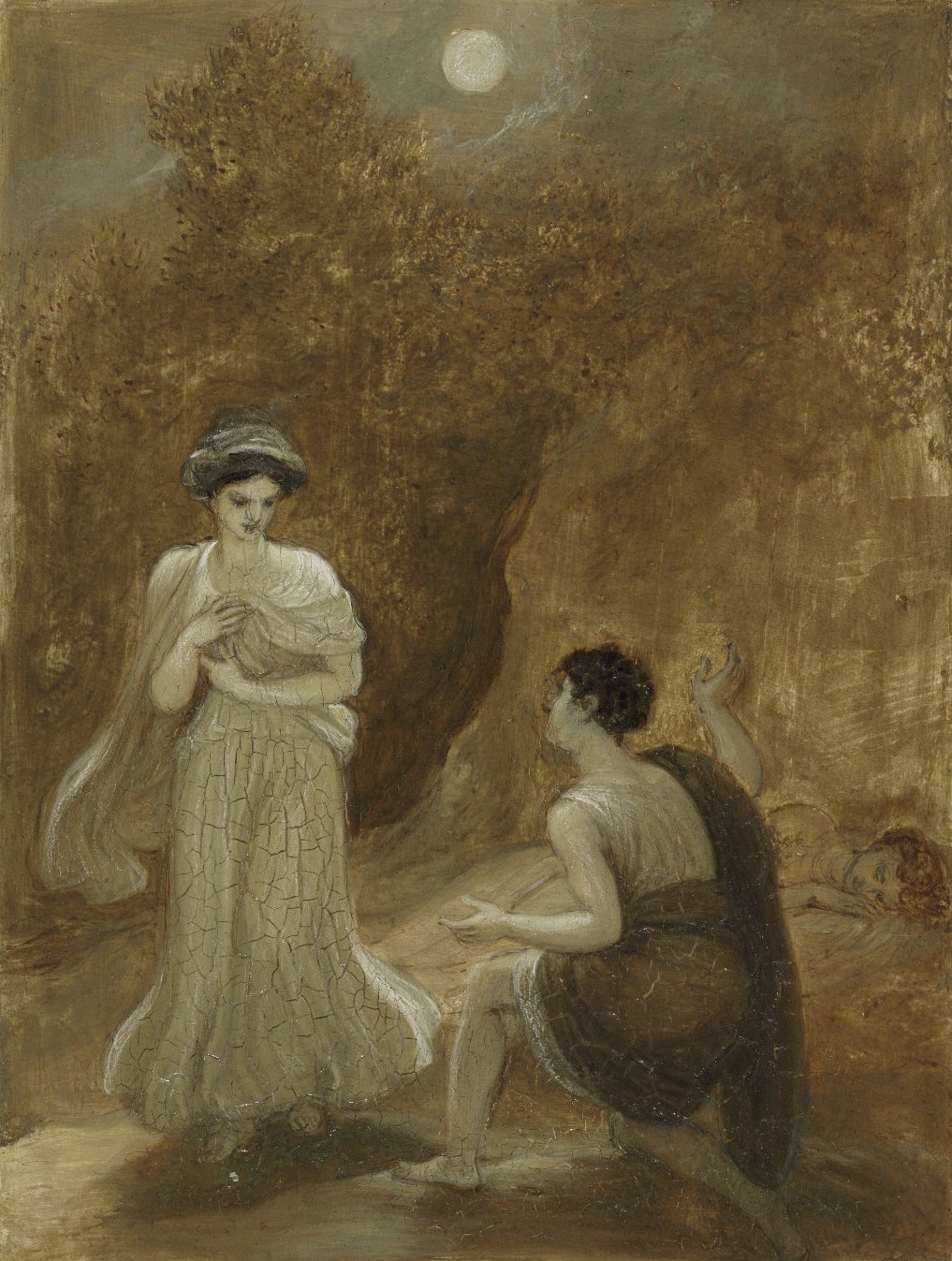
Lysander declaring his passion to Helena, c. 1820–1825

== Sources ==
- "Smirke, Robert (1752-1845)". Dictionary of National Biography. London: Smith, Elder & Co. 1885–1900.
