= Joseph Goodyear =

English engraver

Joseph Goodyear (1799–1839) was an English engraver.

== Biography ==
Joseph Goodyear was born in Birmingham in 1799 and was first apprenticed to an engraver on plate, named Tye. He also studied drawing under G. V. Burkes at Birmingham. He came to London, and was employed at first by Joshua Allen, brother of James Baylis Allen, on engraving devices for shop bills and the like. In 1822 Goodyear placed himself under Charles Heath, the well-known engraver, for three years. Subsequently, he was extensively employed on the minute illustrations and vignettes which adorned the elegant 'Annuals' so much in vogue at that date.

In 1830 he exhibited two engravings at the Suffolk Street Exhibition.

He did not execute any large plate until he was employed by William and Edward Finden to engrave Eastlake's picture of 'The Greek Fugitives' for their Gallery of British Art. This he completed, and the engraving was much admired, but the mental strain and prolonged exertion which was required for so carefully finished an engraving broke down his health. He endured a lingering illness for a year, and died at his house in Kentish Town on 1 October 1839, in his forty-first year, and was buried on the western side of Highgate Cemetery. His grave (no.38), which no longer has a visible headstone or marker, is close to that of James Baylis Allen.
