= William John Newton =

English painter

Sir William John Newton (1785–1869) was an English miniature-painter, in fashion in the early part of the 19th century.

== Life ==
Born in London, he was the son of James Newton the engraver, and nephew of Willam Newton (1735–1790) the architect. He began his career as an engraver, and executed a few plates, including a portrait of Joseph Richardson, M.P., after Martin Archer Shee. Concentrating then on miniature-painting, he became one of the most fashionable artists of his day, and for many years his only real rival was Sir William Ross. In 1831 he was appointed miniature-painter in ordinary to William IV and Queen Adelaide, and from 1837 to 1858 held the same post under Queen Victoria. He was knighted in 1837.

Though popular, Newton was never elected to the Royal Academy. He long resided in Argyll Street, London; after his retirement he moved to 6 Cambridge Terrace, Hyde Park, where he died 22 January 1869.

== Works ==
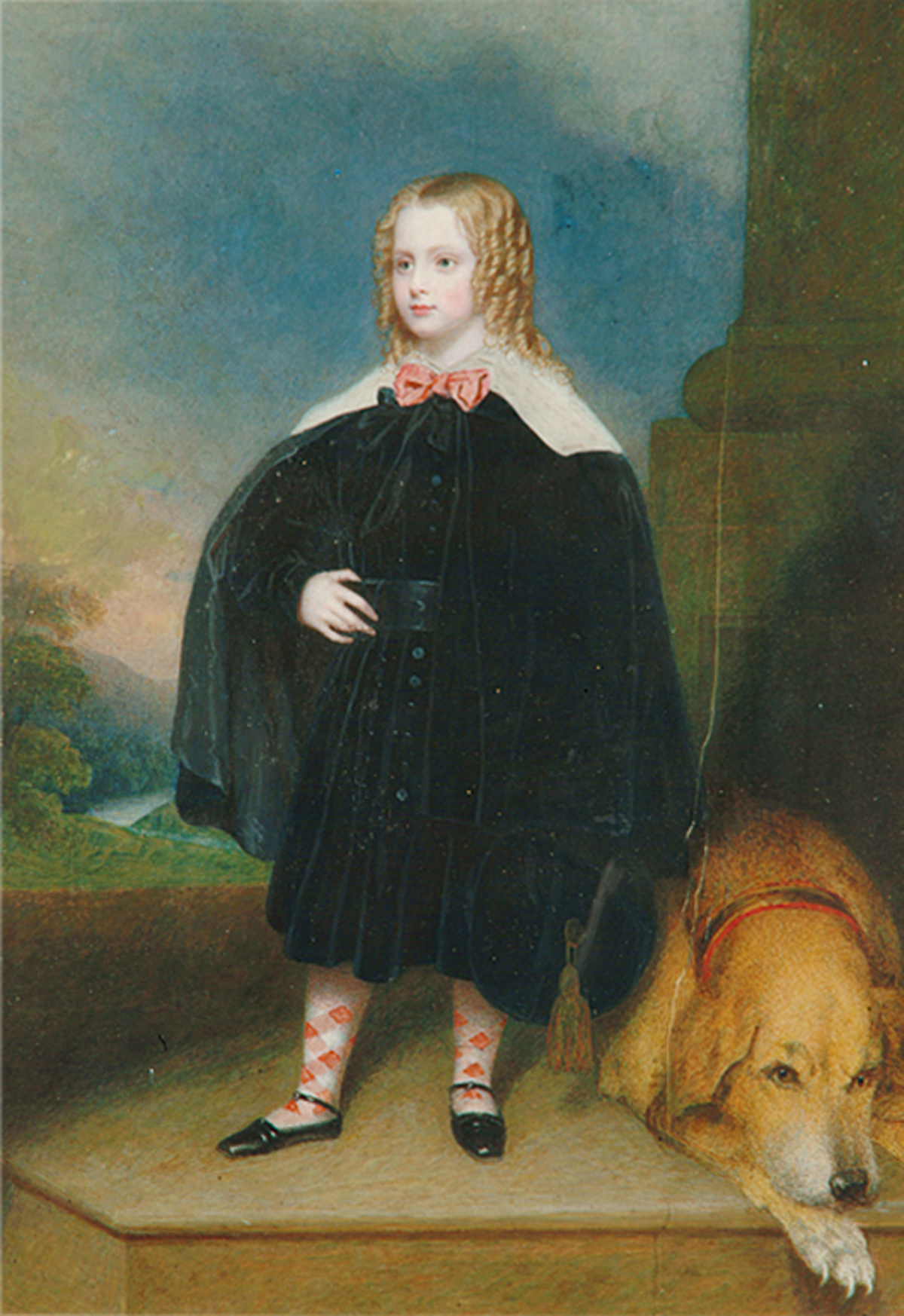
Scottish Child and Dog (1839) by William John Newton

Newton was a constant contributor to Royal Academy exhibitions, from 1808 to 1863. He found a method for joining several pieces of ivory to form a large surface, and was then able to paint some larger groups. Three of these were: The Coronation of the Queen, 1838; The Marriage of the Queen, 1840; and The Christening of the Prince of Wales, 1842.

Many of Newton's portraits were engraved, including those of Stephen Lushington, Joanna Baillie, Sir Herbert Taylor, Joseph Hume, Lady Byron, Mary Ann Paton, and Lady Sophia Gresley. Some drawings by Newton, among them a self-portrait, went to the print room of the British Museum.

== Family ==
Newton married in 1822 Anne, daughter of Robert Faulder; she died in 1856. Their son, Harry Robert Newton, an architect, studied under Sydney Smirke; he died in November 1889. His collection of drawings and manuscripts went to the Institute of British Architects.
