= The Seven Ages of Man (painting series) =

1798–1801 series of paintings by Robert Smirke

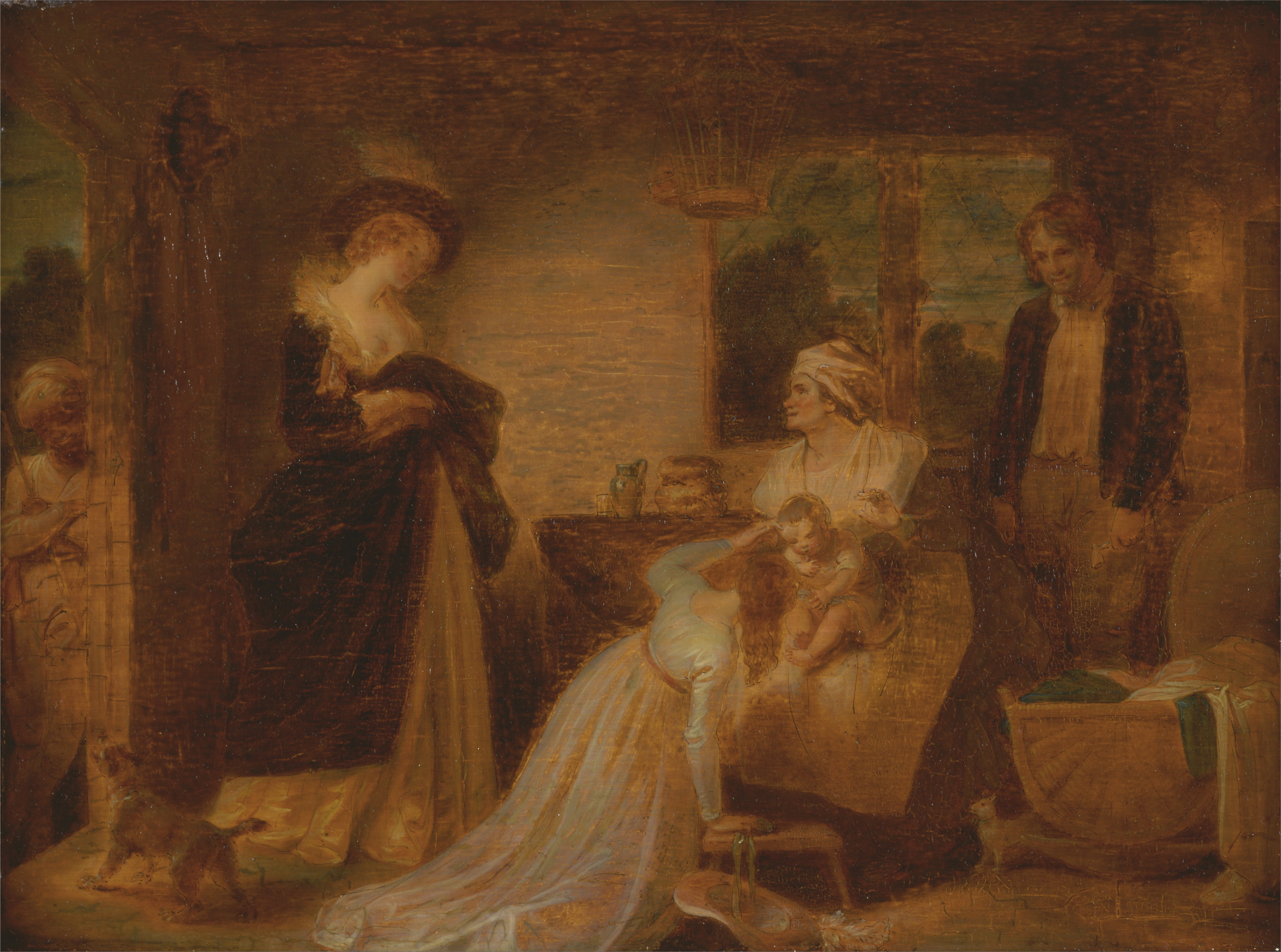
The Infant

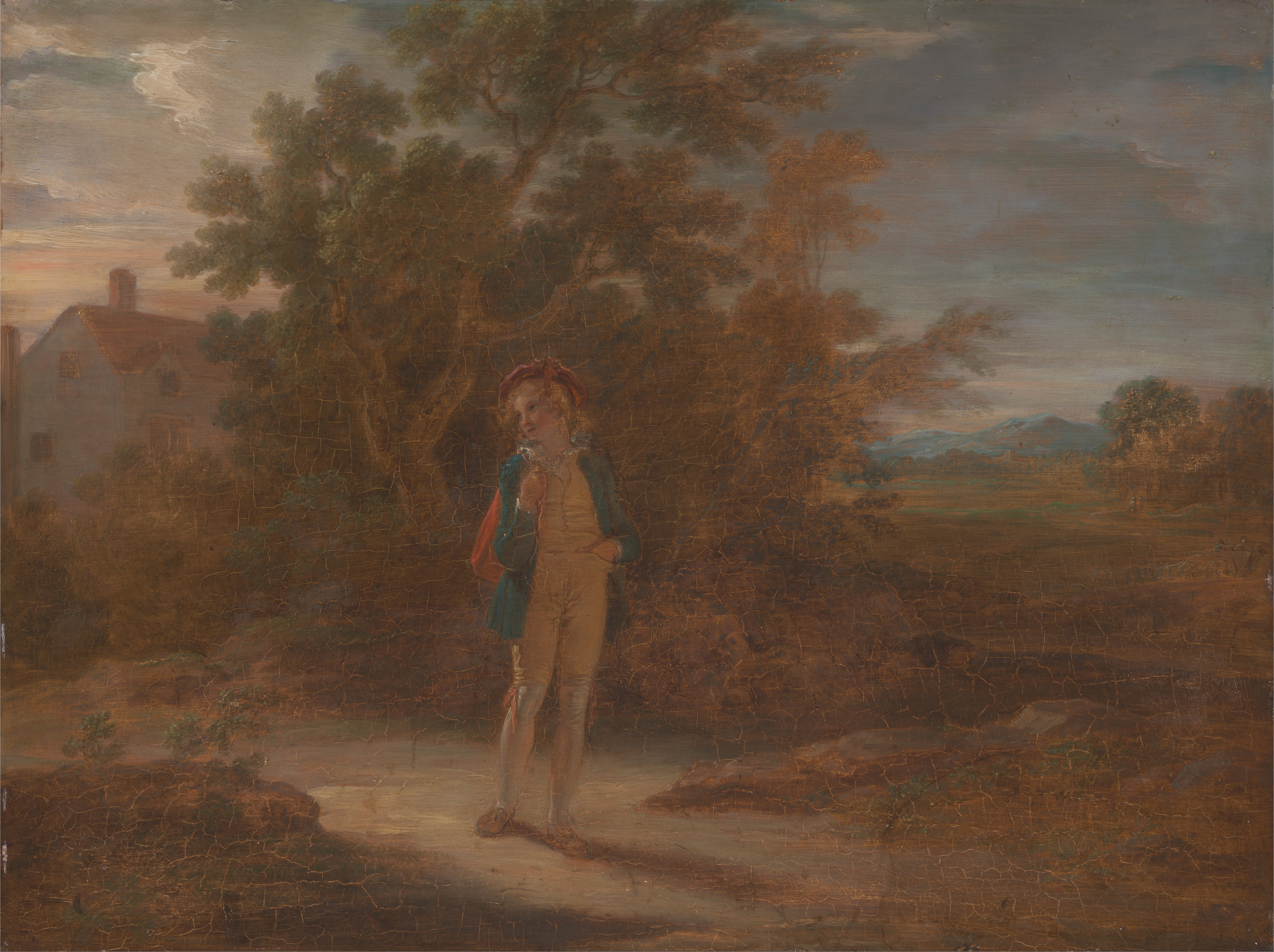
The Schoolboy

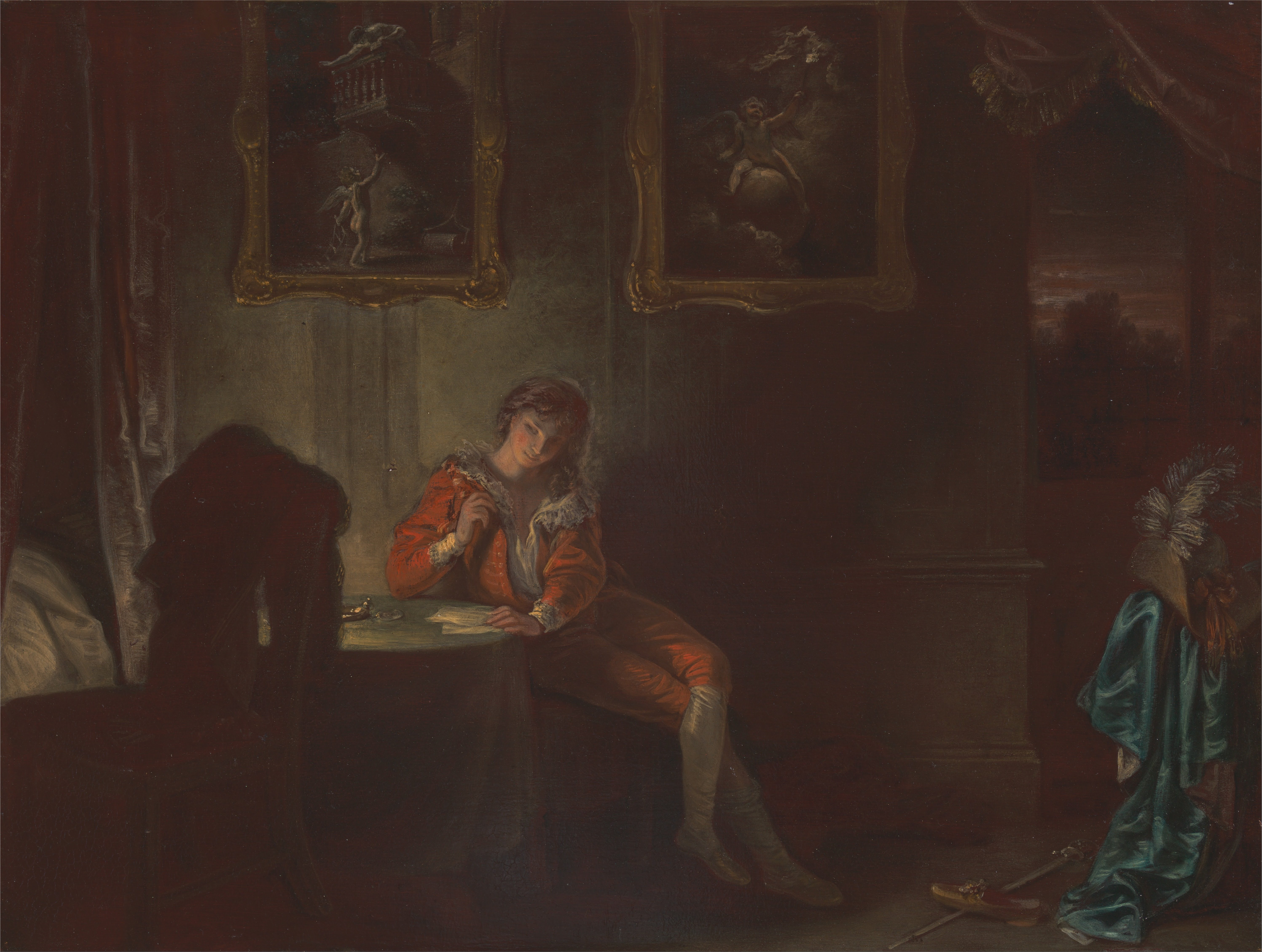
The Lover

The Seven Ages of Man is a series of paintings by Robert Smirke, derived from the famous monologue beginning all the world's a stage from William Shakespeare's As You Like It, spoken by the melancholy Jaques in Act II Scene VII. The stages referred are: infant, schoolboy, lover, soldier, justice, pantaloon and old age.

The set of paintings are in pen and ink and oil on panel, and measure: height: 381 mm (15 in); width: 505 mm (19.88 in). They are now in the Yale Center for British Art, though usually not on display. In 1796, Robert Smirke agreed to paint William Shakespeare's The Seven Ages of Man for John and Josiah Boydell's Shakespeare Gallery.

Painted between 1798 and 1801, they depict the journey of life in its various forms. They were produced for the Boydell Shakespeare Gallery, and engravings by Peltro William Tomkins, John Ogborne, Robert Thew, Peter Simon the Younger and William Satchwell Leney based on Smirke's paintings were included in the gallery's folio edition of Shakespeare's work.

== The monologue ==
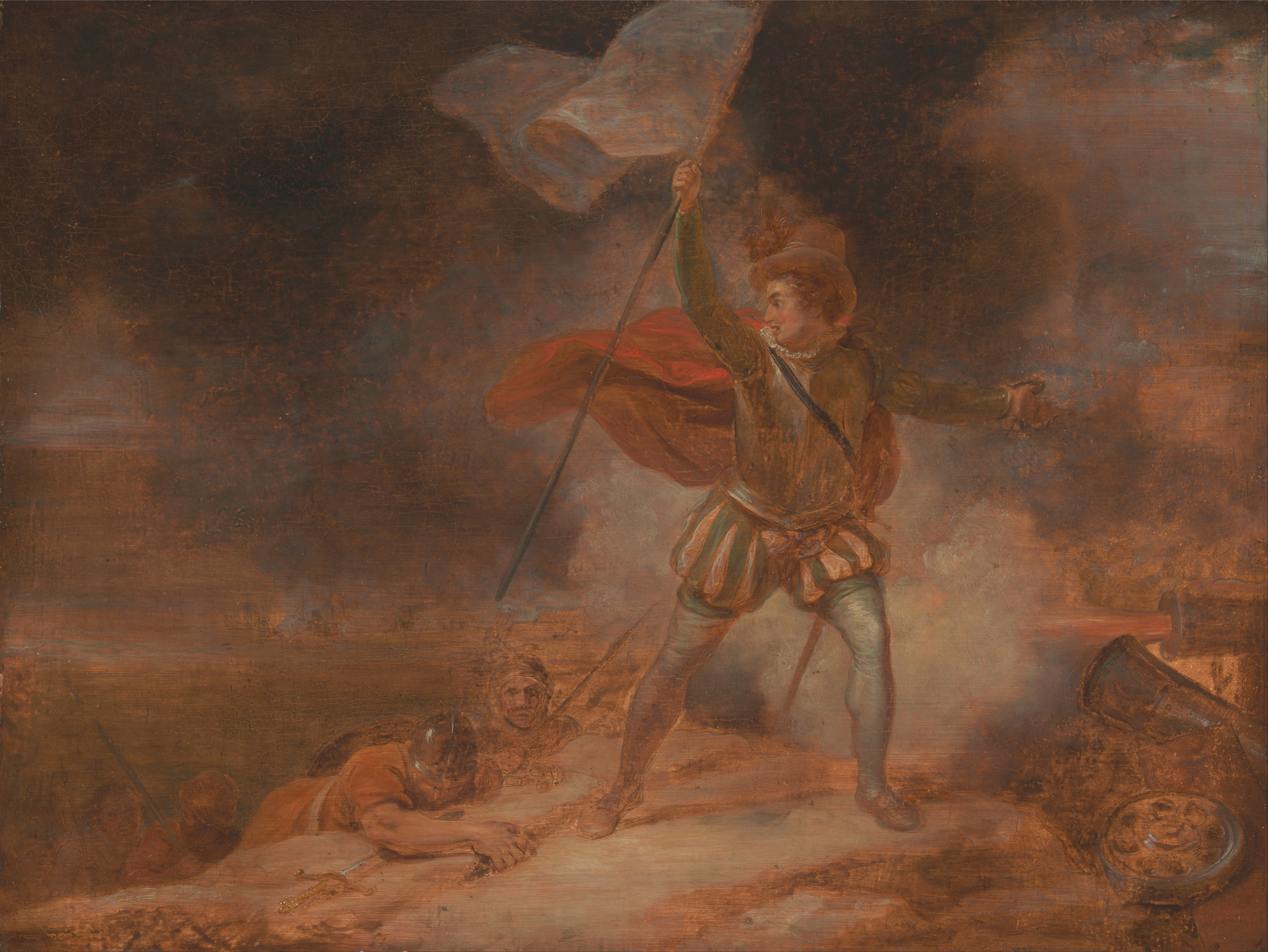
The Soldier

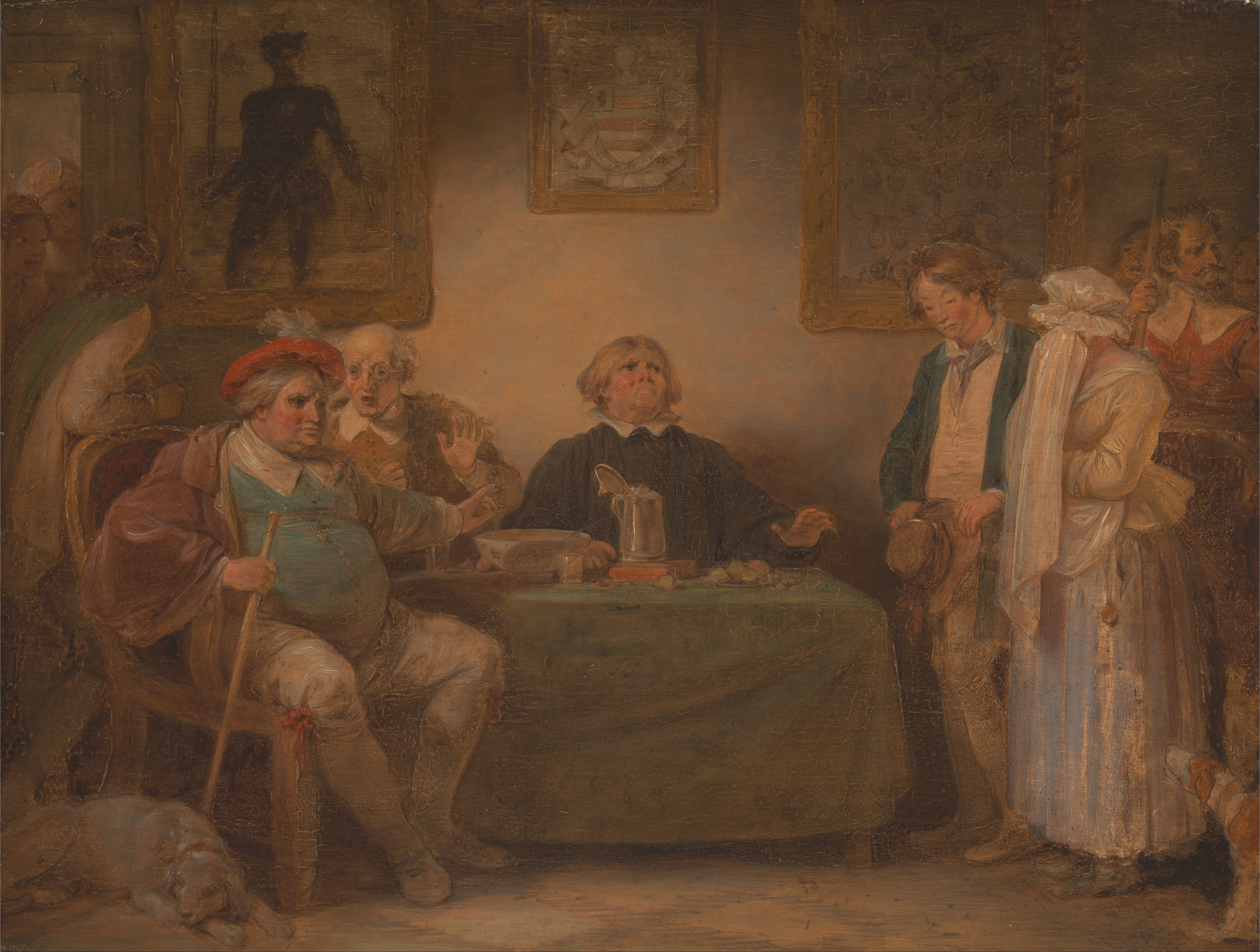
The Justice

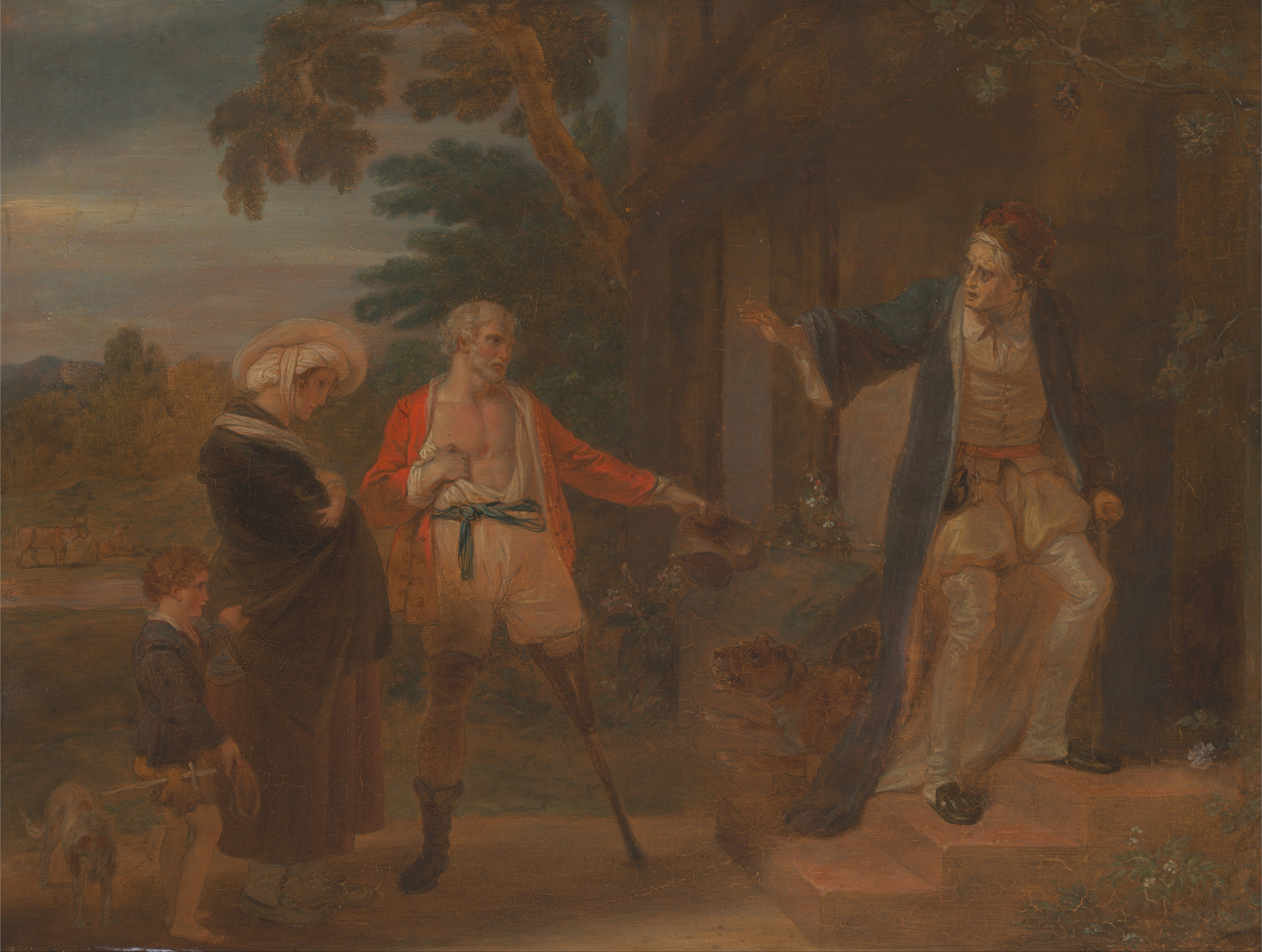
The Pantaloon

"All the world's a stage,
And all the men and women merely players.
They have their exits and their entrances,
And one man in his time plays many parts,
His acts being seven ages. At first the infant,
Mewling and puking in the nurse's arms.
Then, the whining school-boy with his satchel
And shining morning face, creeping like snail
Unwillingly to school. And then the lover,
Sighing like furnace, with a woeful ballad
Made to his mistress' eyebrow. Then, a soldier,
Full of strange oaths, and bearded like the pard,
Jealous in honour, sudden, and quick in quarrel,
Seeking the bubble reputation
Even in the cannon's mouth. And then, the justice,
In fair round belly, with a good capon lined,
With eyes severe, and beard of formal cut,
Full of wise saws, and modern instances,
And so he plays his part. The sixth age shifts
Into the lean and slippered pantaloon,
With spectacles on nose and pouch on side,
His youthful hose, well saved, a world too wide
For his shrunk shank, and his big manly voice,
Turning again toward childish treble, pipes
And whistles in his sound. Last scene of all,
That ends this strange eventful history,
Is second childishness and mere oblivion,
Sans teeth, sans eyes, sans taste, sans everything."

-Act II, Scene VII, Shakespeare's As You Like It

== Descriptions ==
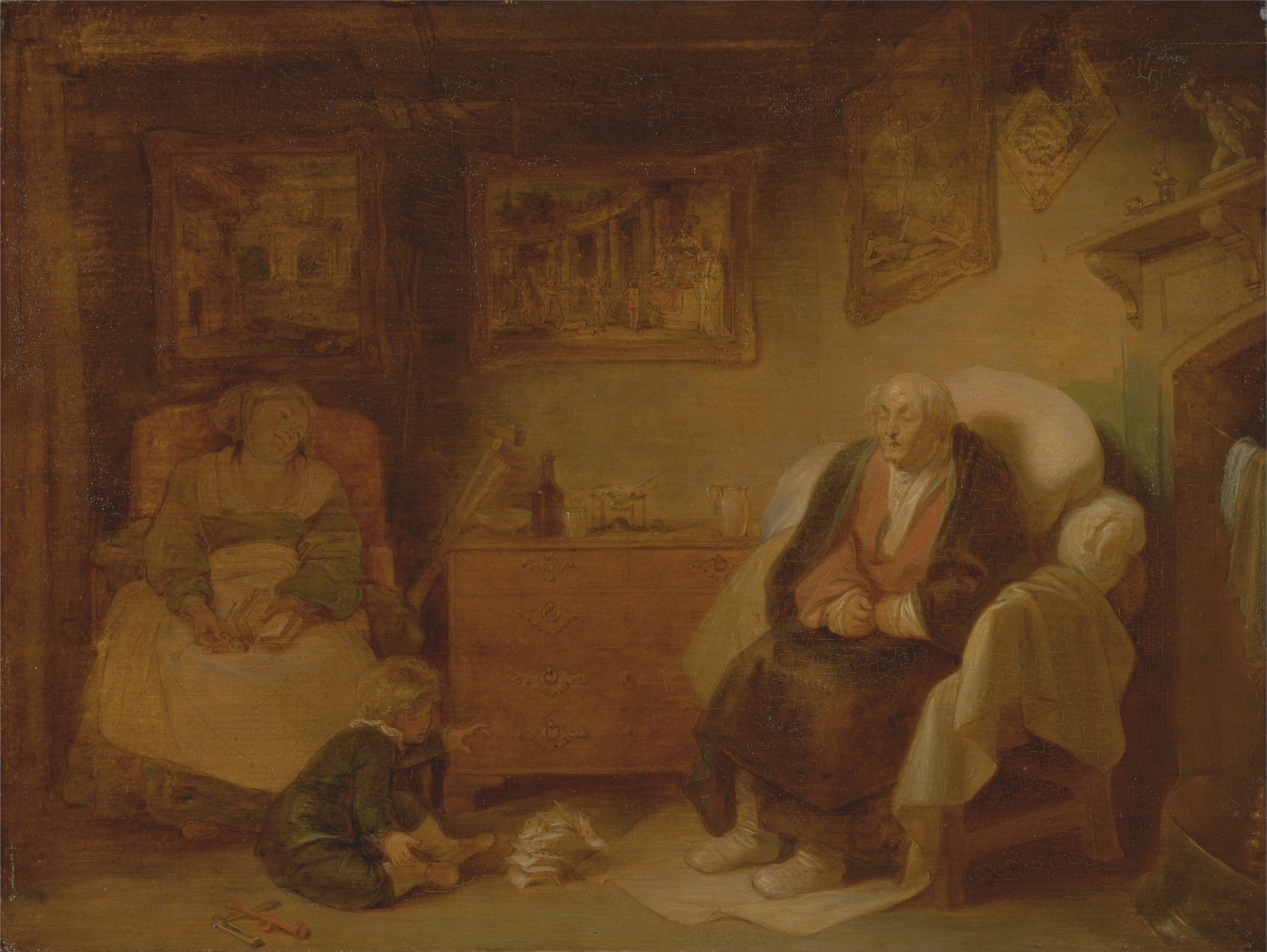
Old Age

=== Infancy ===
Just after being born, he is an innocent baby; all the while wailing and crying like a baby.

=== The Schoolboy ===
Here, he begins his schooling; the charms of helpless innocence cease. It is in that stage of life that he begins to go to school. He is unwilling to leave the protected environments of his home as he is still not confident enough to exercise his own discretion.

=== The Lover ===
The lover is depicted as a young man composing his love poems, shown beneath two pictures of Cupid, the god of love and on the left, Romeo-Juliet balcony scene. In this stage, he is always maudlin, expressing his love in a fatuous manner. He makes himself ridiculous in trying to express his feelings. The child in this stage, cares for its beloved the most and is quite concerned about it and is ready to sacrifice its life also to show its affection towards it.

=== The Soldier ===
He is portrayed as hot-tempered and strongly motivated by a sense of self respect and the desire to gain a reputation. He is very easily aroused and is hot headed. Driven by a passion for warfare, he is quick to react and willing to take considerable risks, even at the cost of his life, to achieve lasting recognition.

=== The Justice ===
In this stage he thinks he has acquired wisdom through the many experiences he has had in life and is likely to impart it. He has reached a stage where he has gained prosperity and social status. He becomes vain and begins to enjoy the finer things of life and he attains a socially accepted state and expounds the wisdom he has gained in his life.

=== The Pantaloon ===
He is a shell of his former self — physically and mentally. He begins to become the butt of others' jokes. He loses his firmness and assertiveness, and shrinks in stature and personality and tries to shrink himself into a shell of his worries and is indifferent to his physical appearance and apparel, just as he was in his youth.

=== Old Age ===
In this stage he is dependent on others for care and unable to interact with the world, he experiences "second innocence, and mere oblivion." This stage is also known as second infancy.

== See also ==
- All the world's a stage
- Jaques
- As You Like It
- Robert Smirke
