= Sir William Alexander, 3rd Baronet =

British Aristocrat

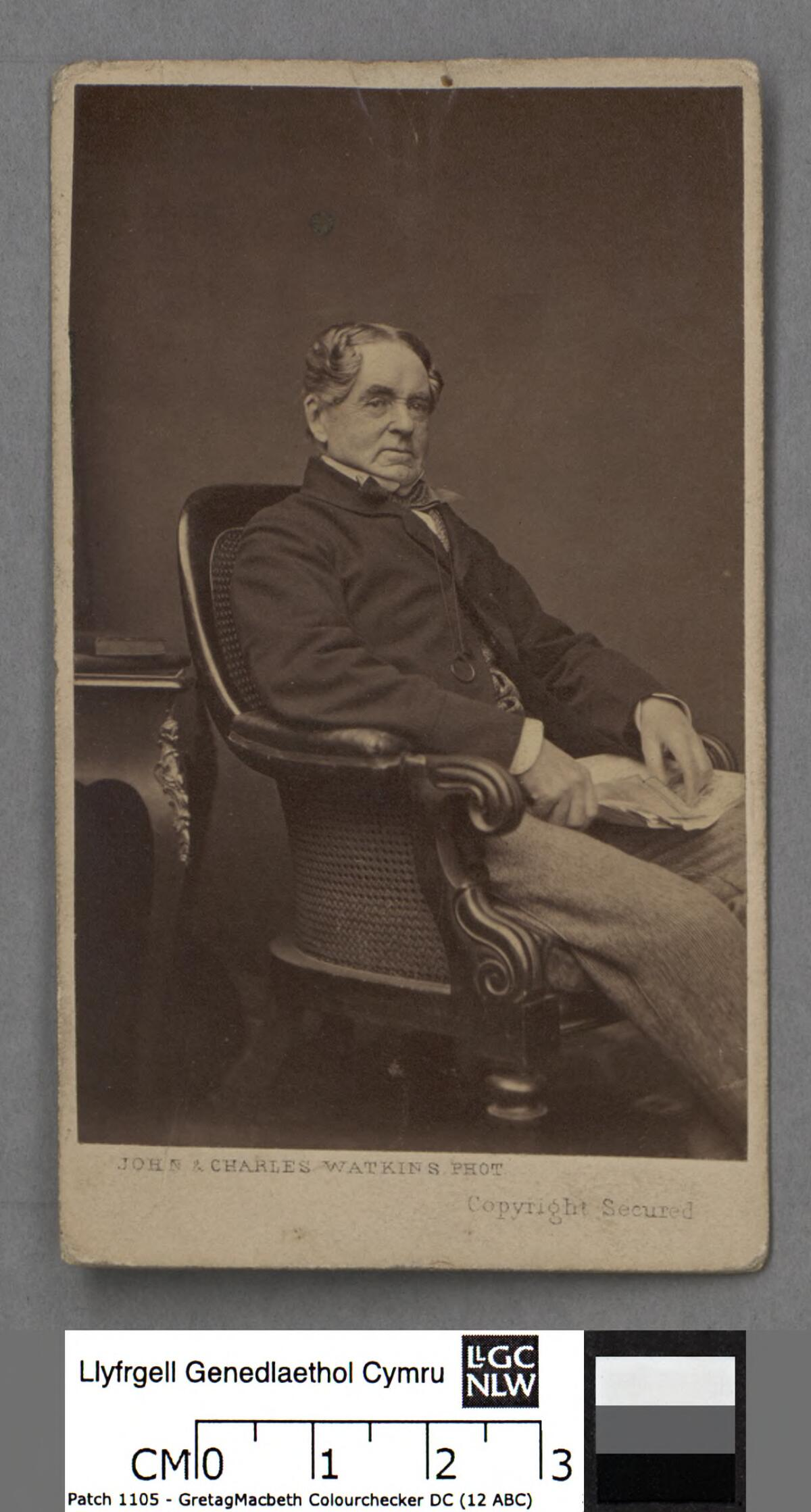

Sir William John Alexander, 3rd Baronet QC (1 April 1797 – 31 March 1873) was a British lawyer.

He was the elder son of Sir Robert Alexander, 2nd Baronet and his wife Elisa Wallis, daughter of John Wallis. In 1859, he succeeded his father as baronet. Alexander was educated at Trinity College Dublin and then at Trinity College, Cambridge, where he graduated Bachelor of Arts and later proceeded Master of Arts.

Alexander was nominated a Queen's Counsel in 1844 and became a bencher of the Middle Temple in the same year. He was called to the bar by Lincoln's Inn in 1825. In 1863, he was appointed Attorney-General of the Duchy of Cornwall by Albert Edward, Prince of Wales, an office he held until his death in 1873.

Alexander died unmarried and was succeeded in the baronetcy by his younger brother John.

Legal offices
Preceded by Sir Edward Smirke	Attorney-General of the Duchy of Cornwall; 1863–1873	Succeeded by George Loch
Baronetage of the United Kingdom
Preceded by Robert Alexander	Baronet (of Dublin); 1859–1873	Succeeded by John Wallis Alexander
