= James Baylis Allen =

British engraver (1803–1876)

- Born: 18 April 1803; Birmingham
- Died: 10 January 1876 (aged 72); London
- Occupation: Engraver

James Baylis Allen (1803–1876) was a British engraver. Allen, together with Edward and William Radclyffe and the Willmores, belonged to a school of landscape-engravers which arose in Birmingham, where there were numerous engravers working on iron and steel manufactures.

== Biography ==
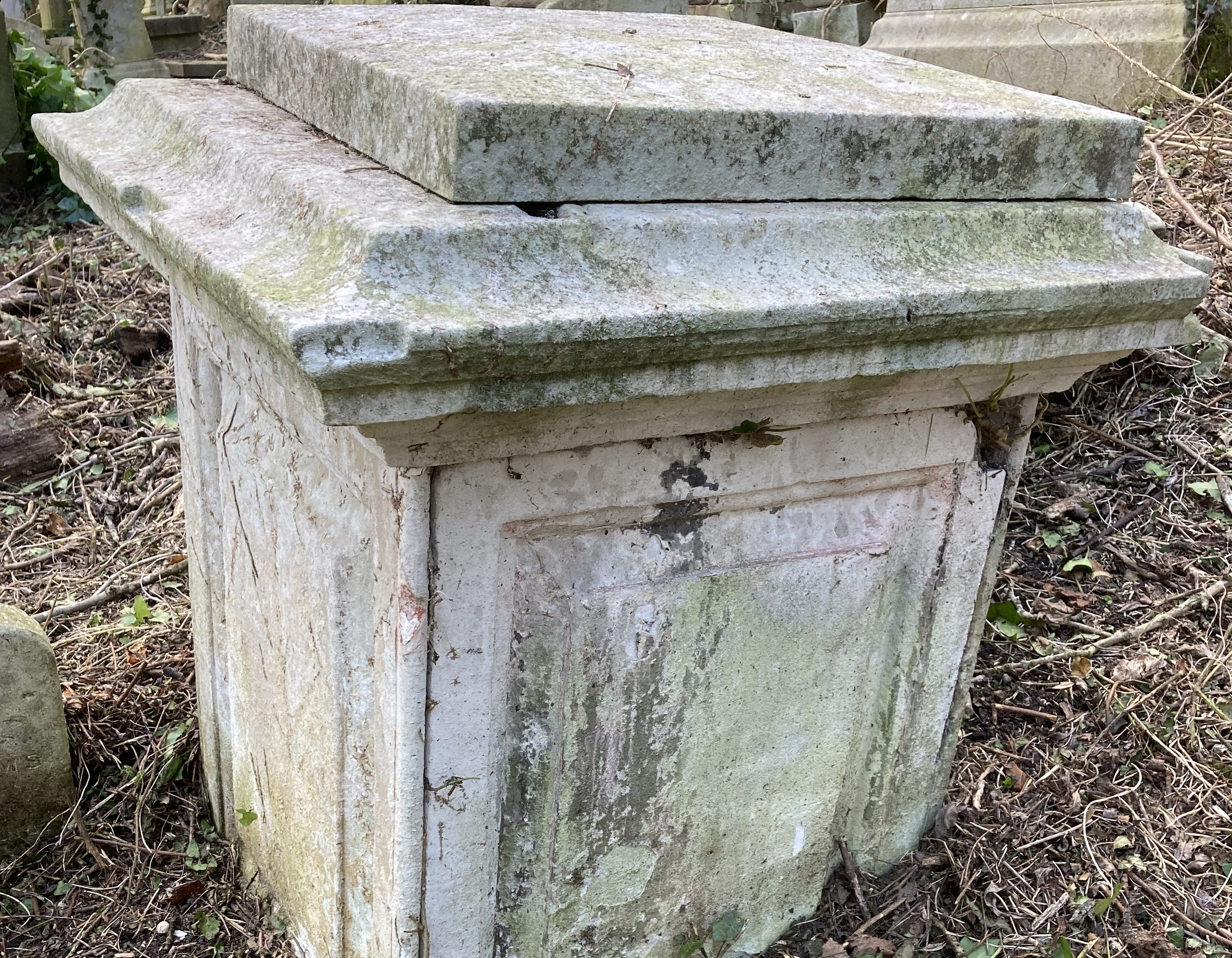
Grave of James Baylis Allen in Highgate Cemetery

Allen was born in Birmingham, 18 April 1803, the son of a button-manufacturer. As a boy he followed his father's business; then about age 15 he was articled to Josiah Allen, an elder brother and general engraver in Birmingham. Three years later he began his artistic training by attending the drawing classes of John Vincent Barber and Samuel Lines.

In 1824 Allen went to London, and found employment in the studio of the Findens, for whose Royal Gallery of British Art he engraved at a later period "Trent in the Tyrol", after Augustus Wall Callcott.

In the 1860s he was living in Cantelowes Road near Camden Town, living at the same address as another artist, Walter James Allen, who was presumably a close relative.

He died after a long illness, still living near Camden Town, on 10 January 1876 and was buried on the western side of Highgate Cemetery. The grave (no 144) no longer has a marker but the remains of the plinth are still visible.

== Works ==
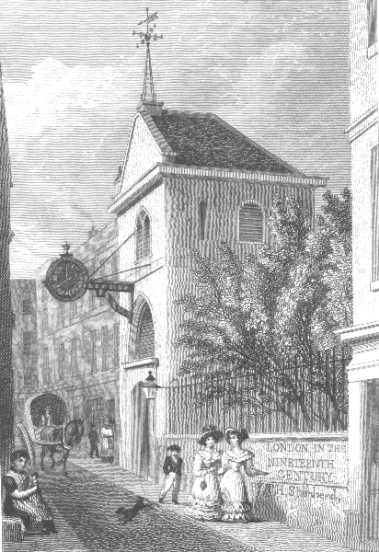
St Martin Ongar, London, an 1831 engraving by Allen from a pencil drawing by Thomas Hosmer Shepherd (1793–1864)

Allen's best known plates are those after J. M. W. Turner's drawings for the ‘Rivers of France,’ 1833–5, consisting of views of Amboise, Caudebec-en-Caux, Havre, and St. Germain; and for the ‘Picturesque Views in England and Wales,’ 1827–38, for which he engraved the plates of Stonyhurst, Upnor Castle, Orfordness, Harborough Sands, and Lowestoft Lighthouse. Other works were ‘The Falls of the Rhine,’ after Turner, for the Keepsake of 1833; some plates after Clarkson Stanfield and Thomas Allom for Charles Heath's Picturesque Annual, and others after Samuel Prout, Roberts, Holland, and James Duffield Harding, for Robert Jennings's Landscape Annual; and ‘The Grand Bal Masqué at the Opera, Paris,’ after Eugène Lami for Allom's France Illustrated.

His larger works were executed chiefly for The Art Journal:

- The Columns of St. Mark, Venice after Bonington
- Battle of Borodino, Lady Godiva, and The Fiery Furnace after George Jones
- Westminster Bridge, 1745 and London Bridge, 1745 after Samuel Scott, for the Vernon Gallery
- Death of Nelson, Phryne going to the Bath as Venus, Decline of Carthage, Ehrenbreitstein, St. Mawes, Cornwall, and Upnor Castle after Turner for the Turner Gallery
- The Battle of Meeanee after Edward Armitage
- Greenwich Hospital after Chambers
- Hyde Park in 1851 after J. D. Harding
- Venice: the Bucentaur and The Dogana, Venice after Canaletto, and The Herdsman after Berchem, for the Royal Gallery
- The Nelson Column after G. Hawkins
- Smyrna after Allom
- The Temple of Jupiter Panhellenius after Turner

He engraved also a set of five views on the coasts of Suffolk and Kent, and plates for William Henry Bartlett's ‘Ireland,’ 1835, Bartlett's ‘Switzerland,’ 1839, Bartlett's ‘Canadian Scenery,’ 1840, Beattie's ‘Scotland,’ 1836, Finden's ‘Views of the Ports and Harbours of Great Britain,’ 1839, and George Newenham Wright's ‘Rhine, Italy, and Greece,’ 1843.
