= Edward Smirke =

English lawyer and antiquary

Sir Edward Smirke (1795 – 4 March 1875) was an English lawyer and antiquary.

== Life ==
The third son of Robert Smirke, and brother of Sir Robert Smirke, and of Sydney Smirke, he was born at Marylebone. He was educated privately and at St. John's College, Cambridge, where he graduated B.A. (being twelfth wrangler) in 1816, and M.A. in 1820. In July 1815 he obtained the Chancellor's gold medal for an English poem on Wallace, which was printed in that year, and in Cambridge Prize Poems (1820, 1828, and 1859).

Smirke was called to the bar at the Middle Temple on 12 November 1824, went on the western circuit, and attended the Hampshire sessions. In December 1844 he was appointed solicitor-general to the Prince of Wales, and on the following 5 February solicitor-general to him as Prince of Wales and Duke of Cornwall. He succeeded to the post of attorney-general to the prince on 25 June 1852, and was ex officio member of his council. By letters patent under the great seal of England he was constituted on 2 July 1853 vice-warden of the stannaries of Cornwall and Devon, which post he held until 29 September 1870. From 1846 to 1855 he was recorder of Southampton. On his retirement in 1870 from active life he was knighted at Windsor.

As a student, Smirke had a predilection for the investigation and elucidation of charters, and for the history of mining in Cornwall. He was a member of the Royal Archæological Institute from its foundation, and took an active part at its annual meetings. From November 1861 to November 1863, and from that date in 1865 to November 1867, he presided over the Royal Institution of Cornwall. During the first of these periods, when the Cambrian Archæological Society paid a visit to Truro in 1862 he presided over the congress. He died at 18 Thurloe Square, South Kensington, on 4 March 1875, and is buried at Kensal Green Cemetery, London. He married at Kensington, on 11 September 1838, Harriet Amelia, youngest daughter of Thomas Neill of Turnham Green. She died at Truro on 23 February 1863.

== Works ==
Apart from many papers read before the Society of Antiquaries and the Royal Institution of Cornwall, Smirke was author of:

- Wallace, a poem, 1815.
- Report of Cases, 1670–1704, by R. Freeman, 2nd ed. 1826.
- Digest of the Law of Evidence on the Trial of Actions at Nisi Prius, by Henry Roscoe. 5th ed., with considerable additions by C. Crompton and E. Smirke, 1839; subsequent editions down to the tenth in 1861 were ‘revised and enlarged’ by him.
- Case of Vice against Thomas, with an Appendix of Records and Documents on the early History of the Tin Mines in Cornwall, 1843.
- A Letter to Lord Campbell on the Rating of Railways, 1851.
- Procedure in the Court of the Vice-warden of the Stannaries, 1856; other volumes of rules and orders were published by him in 1862, 1863, and 1870.

== Sources ==
Attribution

This article incorporates text from a publication now in the public domain: "Smirke, Edward". Dictionary of National Biography. London: Smith, Elder & Co. 1885–1900.

Legal offices
Preceded by Hon. John Chetwynd-Talbot	Attorney-General of the Duchy of Cornwall; 1852–1863	Succeeded by Sir William Alexander, 3rd Bt
