= Sydney Smirke =

British architect

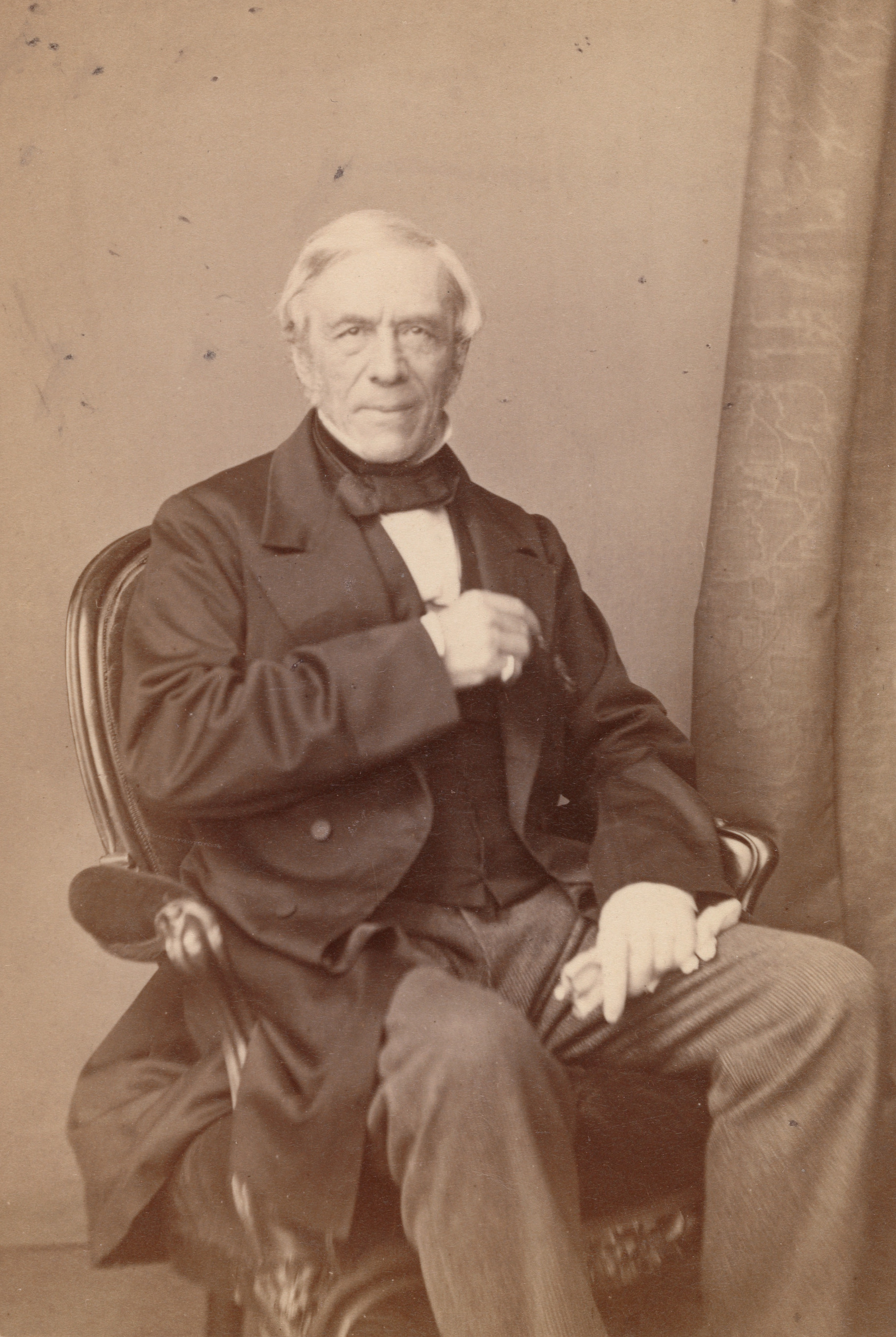
- Sydney Smirke, 1860s
- Born: 20 December 1797; London, England
- Died: 8 December 1877 (aged 79); Tunbridge Wells, Kent, England
- Occupation: Architect
- Awards: RIBA Royal Gold Medal
- Buildings: The circular reading room at the British Museum

Sydney Smirke RA FGS FSA (20 December 1797 – 8 December 1877) was a British architect.

Smirke was born in London, England, as the fifth son of painter Robert Smirke and his wife, Elizabeth Russell. He was the younger brother of Sir Robert Smirke and Sir Edward Smirke, who was also an architect. Their sister Mary Smirke was a noted painter and translator.

He received the RIBA Royal Gold Medal in 1860. He became an associate of the Royal Academy (RA) in 1847 and was elected a full Academician in 1859. He served as RA Treasurer from 1861 to 1874, and was professor of Architecture from 1860 to 1865.

== Personal life ==
He married Isabella Dobson, daughter of Newcastle upon Tyne architect John Dobson, on 8 December 1840 at Newcastle upon Tyne.

Among Smirke's numerous apprentices was the successful York architect George Fowler Jones.

== Smirke's works ==
Sydney Smirke's works include:

- Customs House, High Street, Shoreham-by-Sea (1830)
- Customs House (refronting), Quayside, Newcastle upon Tyne (1833)
- The Orangery in Gunnersbury Park (1836)
- The Custom House, Queen Square, Bristol (1835–57)
- Wellington Pit Surface Buildings (Whitehaven) (1840)
- The nave roof of York Minster (1840–44)
- Holy Trinity Church, Bickerstaffe, Lancashire (1843)
- The Carlton Club in Pall Mall, London (1845)
- The Custom House, Commercial Road, Gloucester (1845)
- The dome chapel of the Bethlem Royal Hospital, St George's Fields, Southwark (now housing the Imperial War Museum) (1846)
- The Frewen Mausoleum at St Mary's Church, Northiam, East Sussex (1846)
- St. James' Church, Westhead, Lancashire (1850)
- St Mary the Virgin Church, Theydon Bois (1850)
- The Derby Hall, Derby Hotel and Athenaeum in Bury (1849–52; the latter two now demolished)
- The circular reading room at the British Museum (1857)
- King Edward's School, Witley, Surrey (1865)
- Exhibition galleries at Burlington House, home of the Royal Academy (1868)

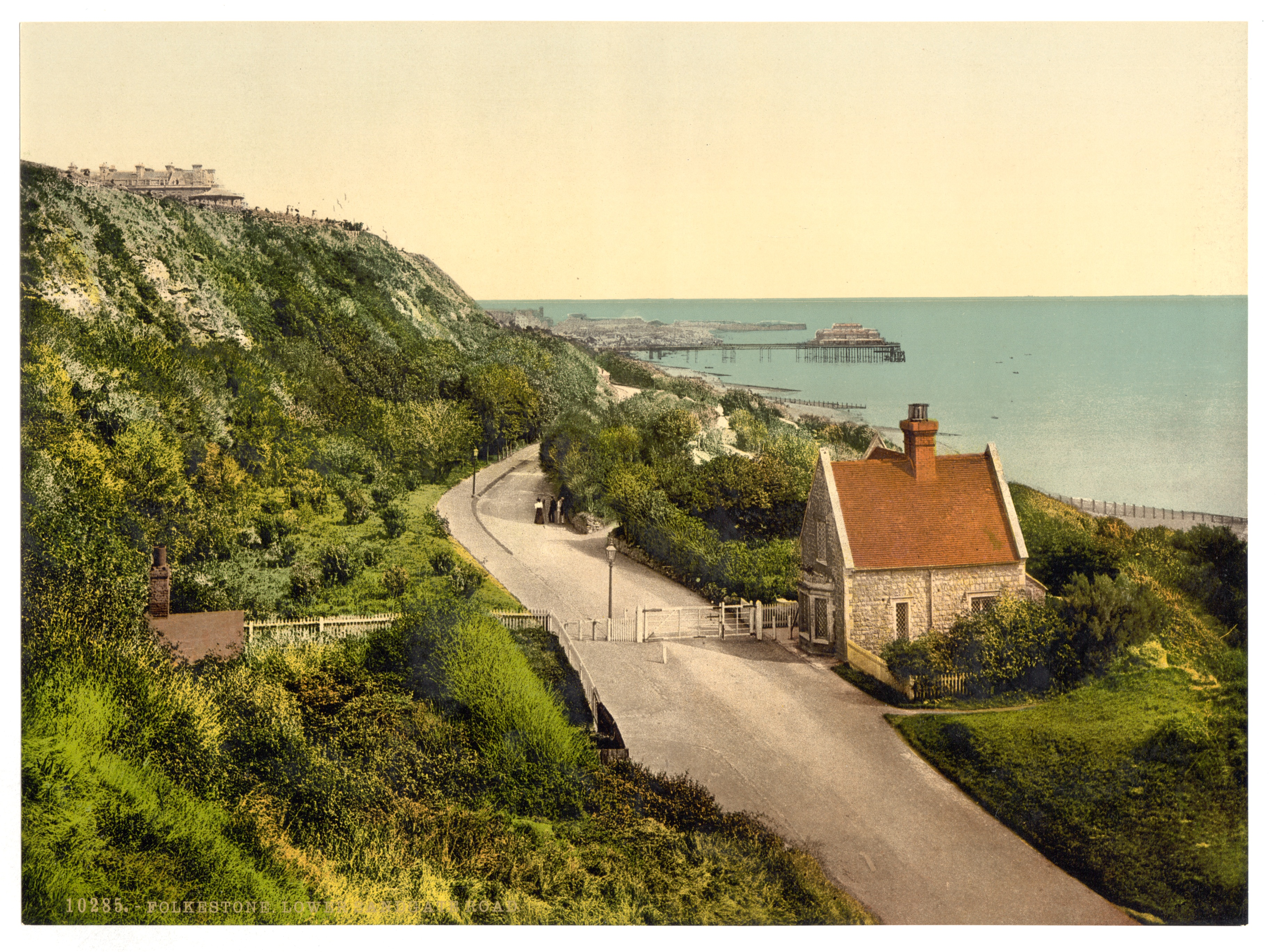
Lower Sandgate Road, Folkestone, with Tollhouse (1847) by Sidney Smirke

- Hall of Inner Temple (1870)
- St John the Baptist Church, Loughton
- Landscaping of Brookwood Cemetery, near Woking, Surrey (with William Tite)
- Toll House, Lower Sandgate Road, Folkestone
- Barkham Street, Wainfleet All Saints
