= Richard Smirke =

English antiquarian draughtsman

Richard Smirke (1778–1815) was an English antiquarian draughtsman. He was the son of Robert Smirke.

Born in 1778, he studied painting in the schools of the Royal Academy, where in 1799 he gained the gold medal with a picture of Samson and Delilah. But his tastes led him to the study of ancient works of art and historical costume, and he became a highly skillful antiquarian draughtsman. When the wall paintings in St. Stephen's Chapel, Westminster, were discovered in 1800, Smirke made a set of facsimile copies of them in watercolours, on a small scale, which are now in the possession of the Society of Antiquaries; he was afterwards employed by the society on similar work. He gave much time to the study of chemistry, and made some discoveries in the qualities of colour. He died at the Howard Arms Inn.

== Gallery ==
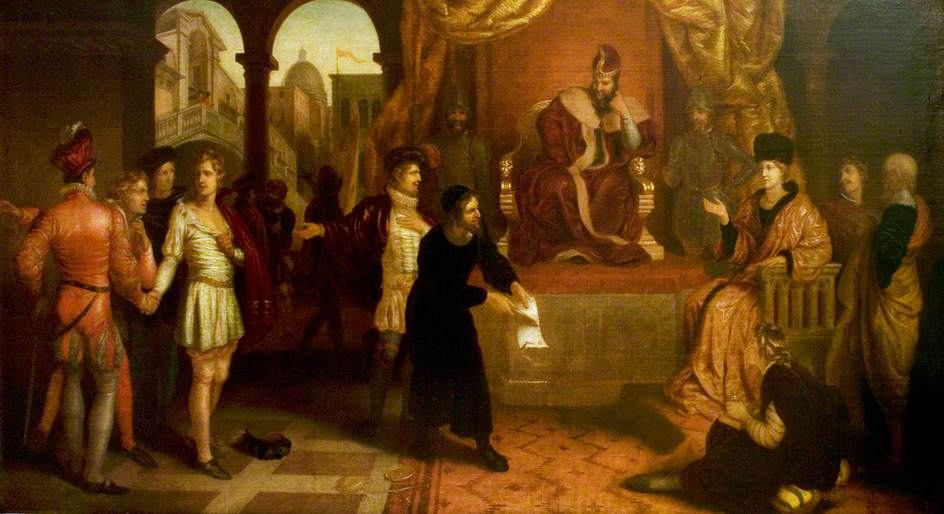
The Merchant of Venice, Act IV

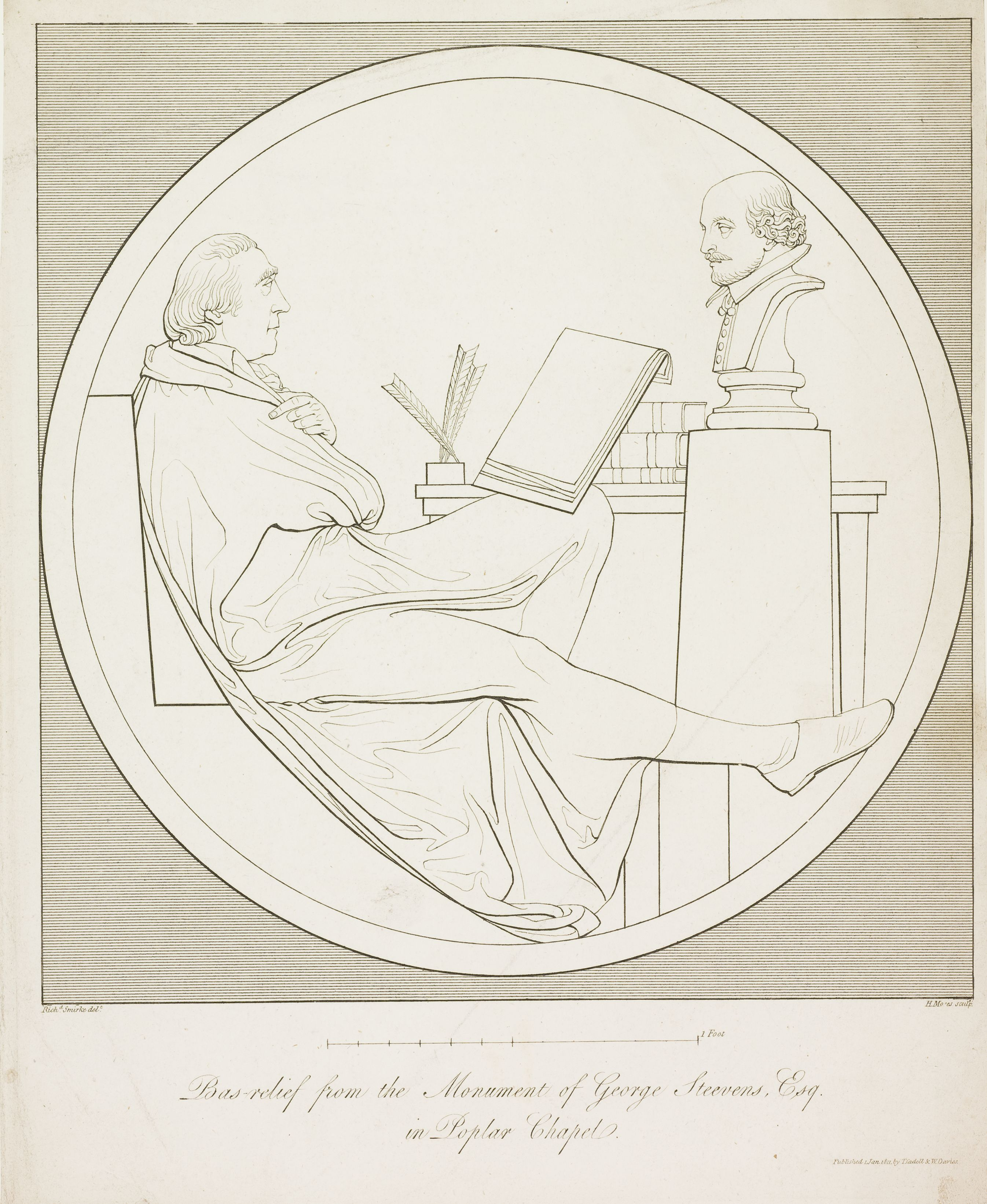
Design for the bas-relief from the Monument of George Steevens

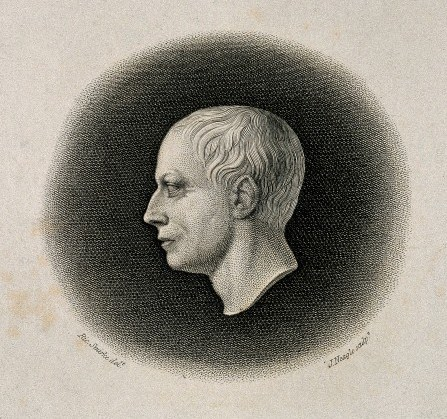
Portrait of Charles Brandon Trye (Neagle, after a drawing by Smirke)

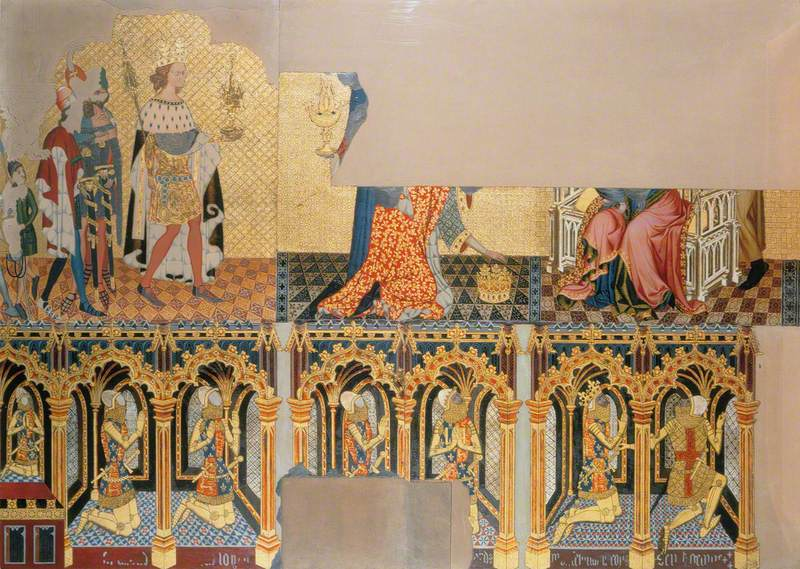
The Adoration of the Magi in Burlington House
