= Peter Toms =

Peter Toms may refer to:

- Peter Toms (painter) (died 1777)
- Peter Toms (politician) (1933–2017)
