= Portrait of William Woollett =

Painting by Gilbert Stuart

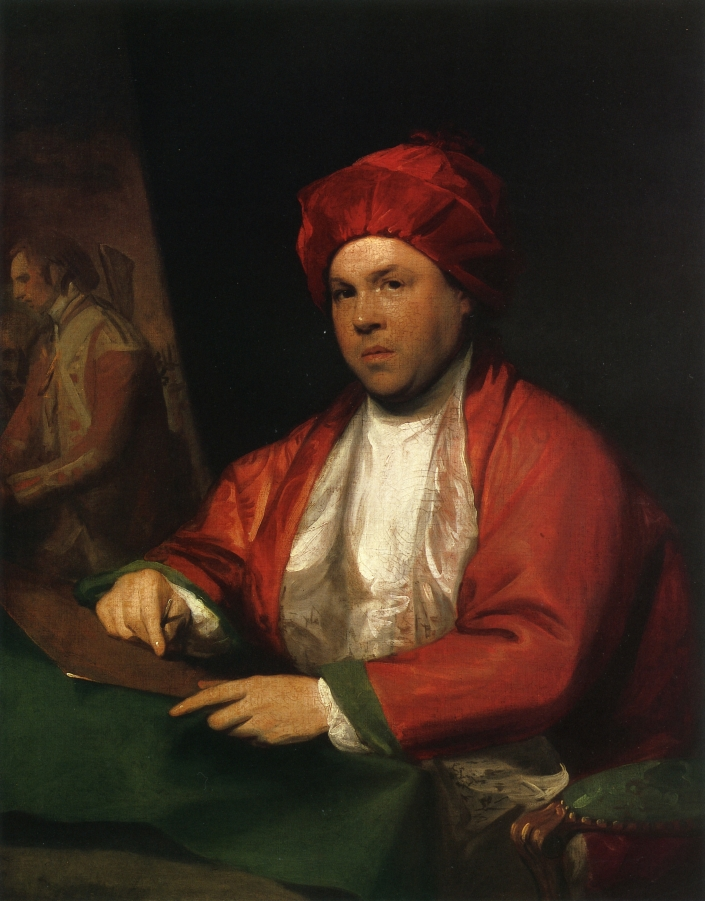
- Artist: Gilbert Stuart
- Year: 1783
- Type: Oil on canvas, portrait painting
- Dimensions: 90.2 cm × 70.5 cm (35.5 in × 27.8 in)
- Location: Tate Britain; London

Portrait of William Woollett is a 1783 portrait painting by the American artist Gilbert Stuart. It depicts the English artist William Woollett, known for his work as an engraver. Woollett is shown engraving his most popular work, a print of Benjamin West's The Death of General Wolfe.

The painting was commissioned by the publisher John Boydell. It was displayed at the exhibition of the Society of Artists in 1783. From 1790 until 1792 it hung in Boydell's Shakespeare Gallery in Pall Mall. Tqhe painting was acquired by the National Gallery in 1849. Today it is in the collection of the Tate Britain in Pimlico. in 1785 this painting was itself engraved by Caroline Watson.

== Bibliography ==
- Barratt, Carrie Rebora & Miles, Ellen G. Gilbert Stuart. Metropolitan Museum of Art, 2004.
- McNairn, Alan. Behold the Hero: General Wolfe and the Arts in the Eighteenth Century. McGill-Queen's Press, 1997
