= Thomas Badeslade =

English topographical draughtsman

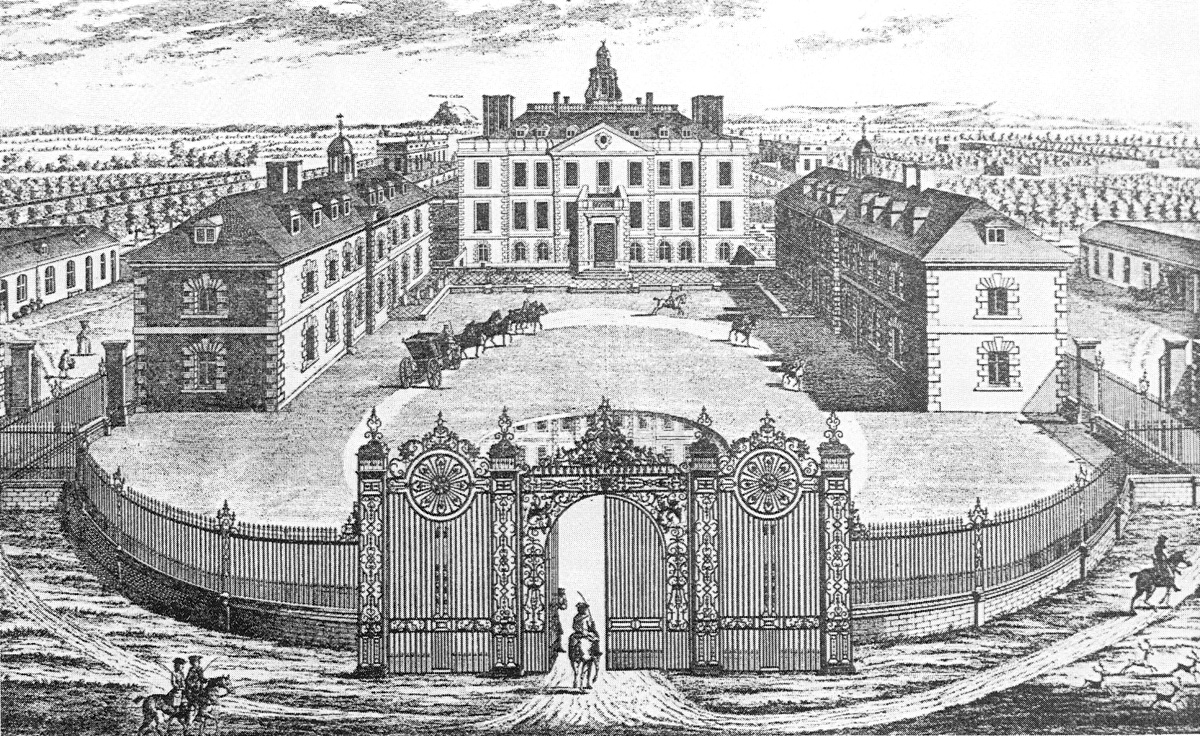
Engraving showing Eaton Hall, Cheshire, by Thomas Badeslade (c. 1740)

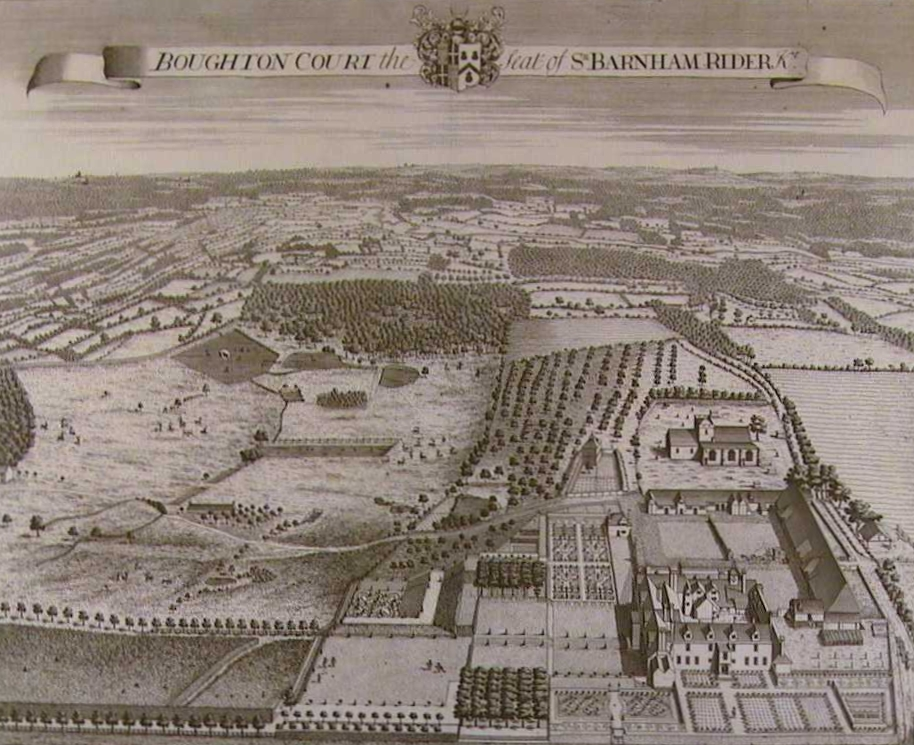
Boughton Court, the Seat of Sir Barnham Rider, Kt, now Boughton Monchelsea Place, from Harris's History of Kent (1719)

Thomas Badeslade (active c. 1719–1750) was an English topographical draughtsman, who worked extensively with the engraver W. H. Toms.

One of his early works was to draw the illustrations for the History of Kent published in 1719 by Dr John Harris. Most of the plates were aerial views of country houses, drawn in the style of Leonard Knyff, a Dutch artist who had worked in England in the early 18th century. Harris was inspired by publication in 1707 and 1708 of two editions of Knyff's drawings of British estates, engraved by John Kip, and decided to attempt a similar work for country houses in Kent. Harris wrote the text himself, and commissioned Badeslade to produce the drawings, of which there were 36 in total. Harris paid for Badeslade to draw the view Rochester and Chatham, and for a bird's eye view of Tunbridge Wells from the south. For the other drawings, the arrangement was that the owner of the estate would pay for the plate to be made, and Harris would pay for the printing. Most of the drawings were engraved by John Kip and the rest by another John Harris (not the author). The history was published in 1719, but the drawings and plates were probably completed several years earlier.

In the 1720s and 1730s, Badeslade produced several volumes dealing with river navigation and canals, such as The history of the ancient and present state of the navigation of the port of King's-Lyn, and of Cambridge, and the rest of the trading-towns in those parts..., a 1725 treatise on fenland navigation and drainage.

It is unclear whether Thomas was the "J. Badeslade" or "T. Badeslade" who is credited along with John Rocque as an illustrator of Colen Campbell's Vitruvius Britannicus, or the British Architect.... Three volumes appeared between 1715 and 1725, and these appear to credit J. Badeslade, who may have been a relative. A small edition of the fourth volume was published in 1739, and this clearly credits Thomas Badeslade and John Roque.

In 1741, Badeslade worked with W. H. Toms on "Chorographia Britanniae or a New Set of Maps of all the Counties in England and Wales". The maps were republished on 29 September 1742, with additional place names. An engraving by W. H. Toms of Badeslade's drawing of Hawarden Castle is reported to have inspired John Boydell to leave Flintshire for London to learn the craft of printmaking.

Other works by Badeslade are known to include a plan of the ornamental gardens at Boughton Park, Northamptonshire and a watercolor of the orangery at Mount Edgcumbe House in Plymouth.

== Works ==
- Harris, John (1719), History of Kent, Illustrated by Thomas Badeslade, OCLC 560654331
- Badeslade, Thomas; Negus, Francis; Moll, Herman (1724), A compleat sett of mapps of England and Wales in general, and of each county in particular : accurately projected in a new method and all of them original drawings, most humbly inscribed to His Majesty King George by Francis Negus, Comisioner for Executing the Office of Master of the Horse to His Majesty : drawn and finsh'd by Tho. Badeslade, 1724., OCLC 702196886
- Badeslade, Thomas (1725), A Survey of the Thames, OCLC 557670671
- Badeslade, Thomas (1725), The history of the ancient and present state of the navigation of the port of King's-Lyn, and of Cambridge, and the rest of the trading-towns in those parts..., OCLC 831172129
- Badeslade, Thomas (1729), A scheme for draining the great level of the fens, called Bedford-Level : and for improving the navigation of Lyn-Regis, OCLC 20885393
- Badeslade, Thomas (1735), Reasons humbly offer'd to the consideration of the publick; shewing how the works ... to recover and preserve the navigation of the River Dee, will destroy the navigation and occasion the drowning of all the low lands adjacent, OCLC 722208256
- Badeslade, Thomas (1736), The new cut canal, intended for improving the navigation of the city of Chester, OCLC 642429656
- Rocque, John; Badeslade, Thomas (1739), Vitruvius Brittanicus, volume the fourth : being a collection of plans, elevations and perspective views, of the royal palaces, noblemen, and gentlemen's seats in Great Britain, not exhibited in any collection of this nature hitherto published, OCLC 78917194
- Badeslade, Thomas; Toms, W. H. (1741), Chorographia Britanniae or a New Set of Maps of all the Counties in England and Wales, OCLC 20712049

== Sources ==
- Bracken, C.W. (10 September 1946), "Mt. Edgcumbe Orangery: Traced Back to 18th Century", Western Morning News: 6 – via British Newspaper Archive
- Flight, Colin (June 2013). "Thomas Badeslade, Illustrations for Harris's 'History of Kent', London, 1719" (PDF).
- "The Famous "Vistas" of Boughton Park", Northampton Mercury: 7, 30 August 1935 – via British Newspaper Archive
- Redgrave, Samuel; Redgrave, Frances Margaret (1878). "Badeslade, Thomas". A Dictionary of Artists of the English School. George Bell & Sons. p. 18.
