= John Haynes (draughtsman) =

British draughtsman and engraver

John Haynes (fl. 1730–1750) was a British draughtsman and engraver. His life is known only from internal evidence in his works, and he was apparently working in York.

== Works ==
Haynes drew and engraved some views of York and Scarborough for Thomas Gent's History of Kingston-on-Hull. He also created many plates for Francis Drake's Eboracum, published in 1736. In 1740, he published an etching from his own drawing of The Dropping Well at Knaresborough as it appeared in the Great Frost, January 1739. Haynes engraved a view of the Duke of Cumberland's Mandarine Yacht at Windsor, in 1753, as well as a large plan of the city of York in 1748. Richard Gough believed that Haynes was more successful at providing drawings for William Henry Toms and others to engrave, than as an engraver in his own right.

== Notes ==
Attribution

This article incorporates text from a publication now in the public domain: Stephen, Leslie; Lee, Sidney, eds. (1891). "Haynes, John (fl.1730-1750)". Dictionary of National Biography. Vol. 25. London: Smith, Elder & Co.
