= The Destruction of the Children of Niobe =

Painting by Richard Wilson

The Destruction of Niobe's Children
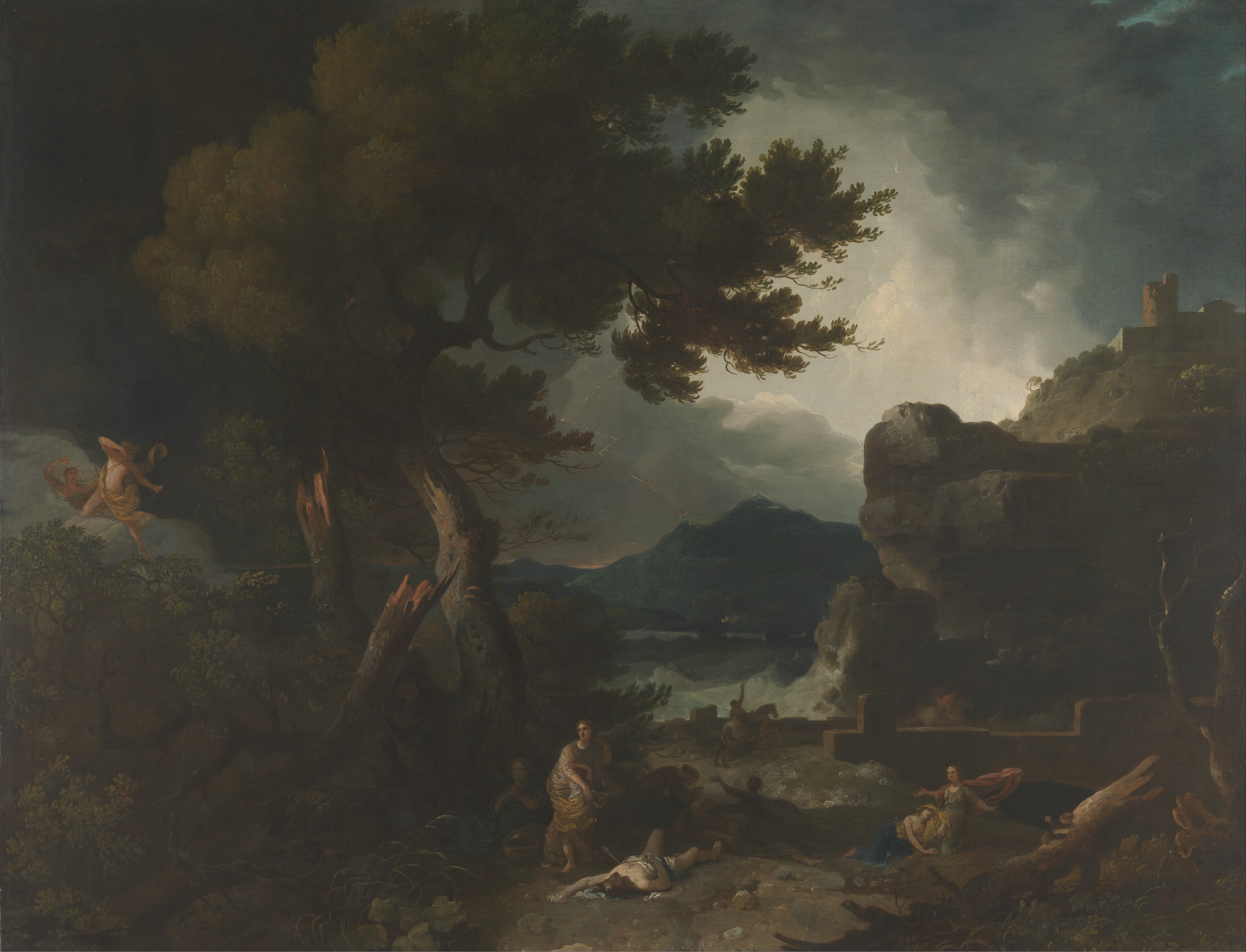
- Artist: Richard Wilson
- Year: 1760
- Medium: Oil on canvas
- Dimensions: 147.3 cm × 188 cm (58.0 in × 74 in)
- Location: Yale Center for British Art, Yale University, New Haven

The Destruction of the Children of Niobe is a painting by Richard Wilson, created in 1760. It depicts the Greek myth of the murder of Niobe's daughters by the goddess Artemis and her sons by Apollo. The painting won acclaim for Wilson, who obtained many commissions from British landowners seeking classical portrayals of their estates.

In 1761, publisher John Boydell hired William Woollett, the foremost engraver in England, to make a print of Wilson's Niobe. Boydell wanted a spectacular print to demonstrate the capability of English engravers, and he paid Woollett approximately £100 for the Niobe engraving, a staggering amount compared to the usual rates. This single act of patronage raised engravers' fees throughout London.

Wilson's painting of Niobe is currently in the collection of Ashridge House in Hertfordshire.
