= William Maitland (historian) =

Scottish merchant (c.1693–1757)

William Maitland (c. 1693–1757) was a Scottish merchant, known as a historian and topographer.

== Life ==
Born at Brechin, Forfarshire, about 1693, Maitland travelled as a hair merchant in northern Europe. He settled for a time in London, and on 12 April 1733 was elected fellow of the Royal Society, and on 13 March 1736 member of the Society of Antiquaries of London. He resigned from the latter in December 1740 when he returned to Scotland.

== Works ==
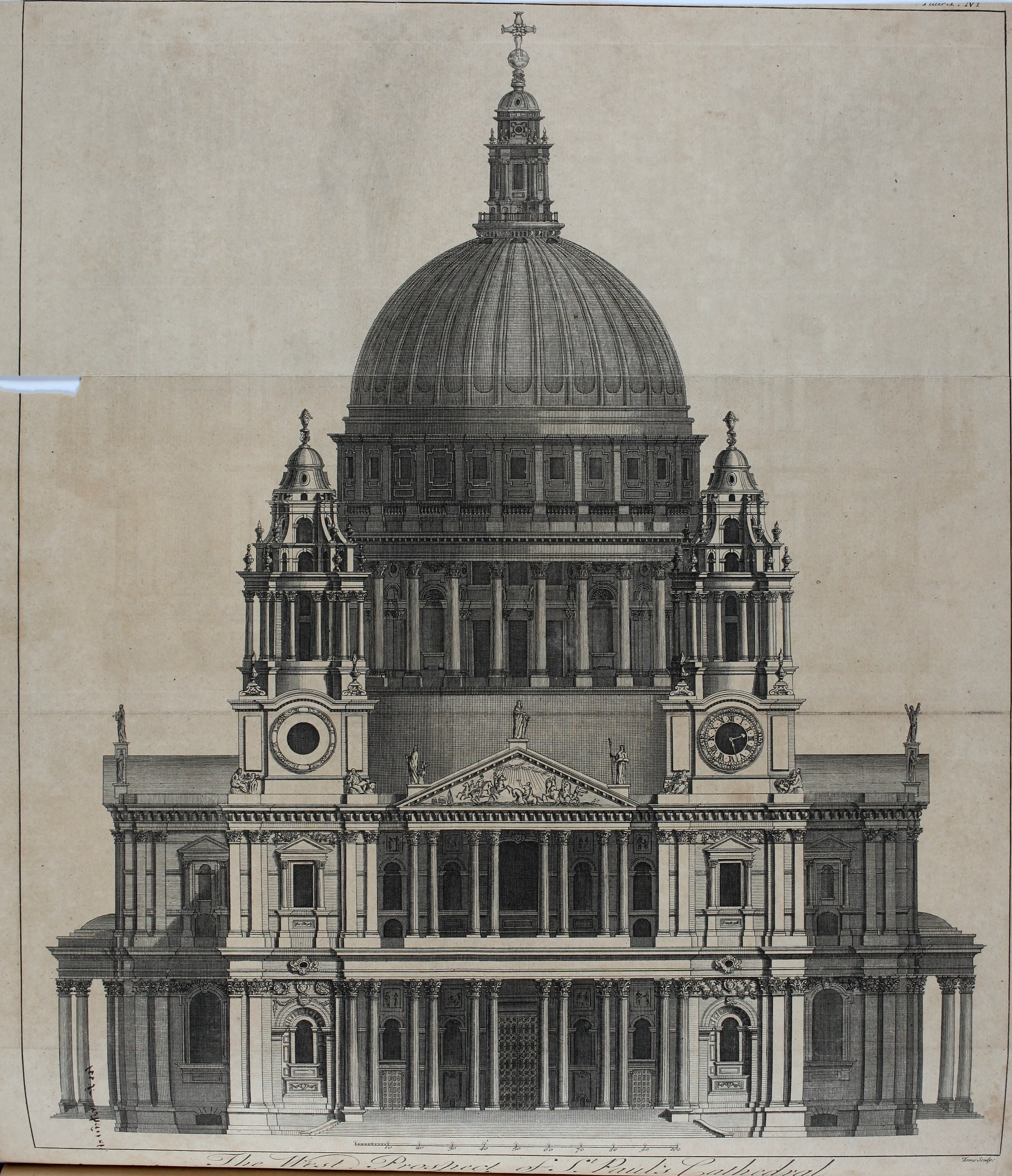
The history and survey of London, by William Maitland, 1756.

Most of the print of Bethlehem Hospital by William Henry Toms for Maitland's History of London, published 1739.

In 1739 Maitland published The History of London, from its Foundation by the Romans to the present time. . . . With the several accounts of Westminster, Middlesex, Southwark, and other parts within the Bill of Mortality. The whole illustrated with a variety of fine cuts, London, 1739 (another edition, brought down to 1756, 2 vols. 1756, 3rd edition 1700, 4th edition 1769). An edition enlarged and continued to 1772, by John Entick, appeared in 1775. The illustrations were by William Henry Toms after Robert West. His next publication was The History of Edinburgh, from its Foundation to the present time . . . with the several accounts of the Parishes. . . within the Suburbs, the antient and present state of Leith, and ... a great variety of cuts of the principal buildings, Edinburgh, 1753.

Around 1750 Maitland planned to write a general description of Scotland, and sent a printed letter and a list of queries to every minister in the country. The response was inadequate; but he went ahead with a tour of the country. His History and Antiquities of Scotland from the earliest account to the Death of James I . . . 1437; and from that period to the Accession of James VI to the Crown of England, 1603, by another hand, 2 vols, London, 1757, was a posthumous work, with his first-hand experience used in the first volume.
