= Thomas Gent =

Irish printer and writer (1693–1778)

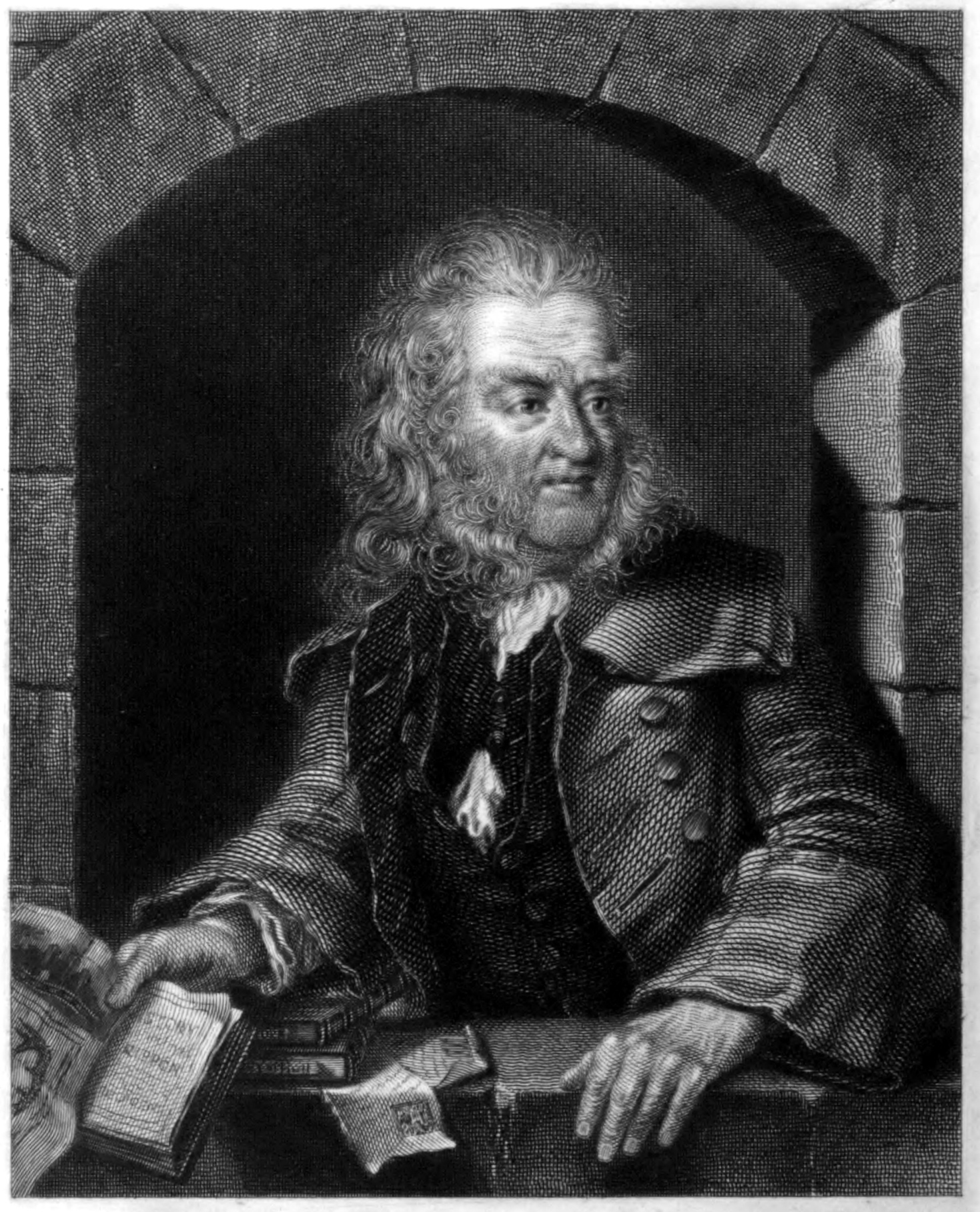
- Thomas Gent, in later life, mezzotint based on an oil painting by Nathan Drake
- Born: 4 May 1693; Ireland
- Died: 19 May 1778 (aged 85); York

Thomas Gent (1693–1778) was a printer and writer, born in Ireland, who spent most of his working life in York. He authored several works, mostly histories, but was financially unsuccessful.

His poetry and the woodcut illustrations in his publications are considered to be of a low standard, but his historical accounts, as well as details in his autobiography, are considered to be valuable historical resources.

== Biography ==
Thomas Gent was born to parents of ordinary backgrounds. His father was an Englishman, and he was baptised a Presbyterian. His parents ensured he educated himself during his childhood, and in 1707 he began an apprenticeship with Stephen Powell, a printer of Dublin.

Gent's apprenticeship was an unhappy one, and in 1710 he absconded, and stowed away on a ship, arriving in Wirral, England, then travelled to London where he took up an apprenticeship under Edward Midwinter. After completing his apprenticeship in 1713, he worked briefly for a Mrs. Bradford, and then for a printer named Mears, who involved him in a humiliating initiation rite, discharging him soon after, following which he subsisted by labouring. After several months he obtained a post with John White, King's printer for York, at a rate of £18 a year, plus board and lodging, arriving in April 1714. There he met Alice Guy, whom he would later marry, who became the object of his affections.

At the end of a year with White, Gent would not renew his contract until he had returned to Ireland and visited his parents but was compelled to leave on account of his former apprentice-master attempting to have him seized for absconding. After a period in York he returned to London, and again entered the employment of Midwinter; in 1717 he was admitted to the Company of Stationers and became a freeman of London the same year.

He briefly returned to Ireland again, visiting his parents, and returned to London, taking up employment under a Roman Catholic named Clifton, meeting Atterbury, Bishop of Rochester, for whom he printed a defence of an imprisoned Clergyman. Gent was sought by Midwinter on a number of occasions to return to work with him, eventually leaving the troublesome Clifton. Gent was briefly arrested, on suspicion of printing treasonable works, and placed in prison for five days, but was acquitted without charge.

Gent was seeking to establish himself as a printer in his own right, so that he had the means to marry Alice Guy. However, she married Charles Bourne, grandson of John White and inheritor of his printshop, in 1721. Alice was widowed in 1724, and Gent travelled to York, marrying her in York Minster in December 1724, and by marriage, obtained a print business in York. Gent became publisher of Yorkshire's only newspaper, the Original York Courant, or Weekly Journal, previously the York Mercury.

John White Jnr, printer of Newcastle, son of John White, who had hoped but failed to obtain the York Press for himself set up a rival business in York; the competition prompted Gent to begin to author his own works, and he published A History of York in 1730, followed by one of Ripon in 1733, and of Hull in 1735. Gent's paper ceased publication in 1728, and White's The York Courant became the predominant local paper. Also in 1735 he began the publication of a journal Miscellanea Curiosa, concerned with mathematical and other problems – the publication was not a success.

In 1741 Gent published a history of England, with it a history of Rome in the second volume. From the 1740s Gent's business went into decline, due to competition from John White Jnr., and other printers who had set up in York; he lost the lease on his house and print premises in Stonegate in 1742, and moved to a house in Petergate, where he continued to publish but with reduced output. He published several works covering religious topics, in poem form, the first being The Holy Life and Death of St. Winefred.

On 1 April 1761 his wife, Alice died. His circumstances were much reduced in the last decades of his life, struggling with illness, and poverty, relying on the charity of friends. He died on 19 May 1778, and was buried at St. Michael-le-Belfry in York.

=== Legacy ===
Thomas and Alice Gent's only child Charles died in early childhood in 1726.

Charles Federer characterised Gent as the pre-eminent producer of chapbooks in Yorkshire during his career. Gent's poetry was of an uninspired quality, Tedder describes it as "beneath criticism", Gent's own woodcuts were also primitive.

He is best known for his local histories of Hull and York and Ripon, which contain information not noted elsewhere, and are the earliest discrete histories of those towns; Gent's works are considered to be based on genuine research, observation, or recording, and not based on a regurgitation of other accounts, and contain descriptions of objects not extant at the time of writing of later histories.

=== Works ===
Gent is known to have published more than sixty works, his authored works include:

- God's judgments shewn unto mankind. Being a true and sorrowful relation of the sufferings of the city of Marseilles in France, 1720
- The forsaken lover's letter to his former sweetheart, 1722
- Divine entertainments: or, penitential desires, sighs, and groans of the wounded soul, 1724
- Gent, Thomas (1730), The Antient and Modern History of the famous City of YORK ..
- Gent, Thomas (1733), The History of the Loyal Town of Rippon
- Miscellanae curiosae: or entertainments for the ingenious of both sexes, 1733
- The pattern of piety: or, tryals of patience, 1734
- The pattern of piety: or, Tryals of Patience. Being The Most Faithful Spiritual Songs of the Life and Death of the once Afflicted Job, 1734
- Annales Regioduni Hullini : Or, The History of the Royal and Beautiful Town of Kingston-upon-Hull.., 1869 [1735], reprinted. (with additional large illustrations by John Haynes.)
- Pater patriae: being, an elegiac pastoral dialogue, 1738
- Historia Compendiosa Anglicana: Or, A Compendious and Delightful History of England ... A succinct History of ROME, from its Foundation by Romulus 'till the Fall of K. Tarquin.. An Appendix, relating to York .. A further Historical Account of Pontefract, 1741
  - Volume 1 : Historia Compendiosa Anglicana; Book 2; Book 3; Book 4; Book 5; A Comprehensive dissertation on the Ancient and Present State of Pontefract..
  - Volume 2 : Historia Compendiola Romana; Book 6; Book 7; Book 8; Book 9; Addenda; Appendix; Index, errata
- British piety display'd in the glorious life, suffering, and death of the blessed St. Winefred, 1742
- The Holy Life and Death of St. Winefred and other Religious Persons in Five Parts, 1742
- The History of the Life and Miracles of our Blessed Saviour Jesus Christ from His Birth to His Crucifixion. As also the lives, sufferings, and death of the Evangelists and Apostles, 1889
- Piety Display'd in the Holy Life and Death of the Antient and Celebrated St. Robert, Hermit, at Knaresborough.. (2 ed.), 1889
- Gent, Thomas (1762), The most delectable, scriptural, and pious history of the famous great easter window ... in St. Peter's Cathedral, York
- The pious and poetical works. 11 parts, 1734–72
- Gent, Thomas (1761), The Contingencies, Vicissitdues or Changes of this transitory Life..., transcript with notes of a performed prologue
- Poetical pieces by Thomas Gent, 1772
- Set forth the unhappy Birth, wicked Life, and miserable End of that deceitful Apostle, Judas Iscariot.., 1772

==== Autobiography ====
- Gent, Thomas (1832) [1746], Life of Mr. Thomas Gent, Printer of York; written by himself
Woodcuts from Annales Regioduni Hullini
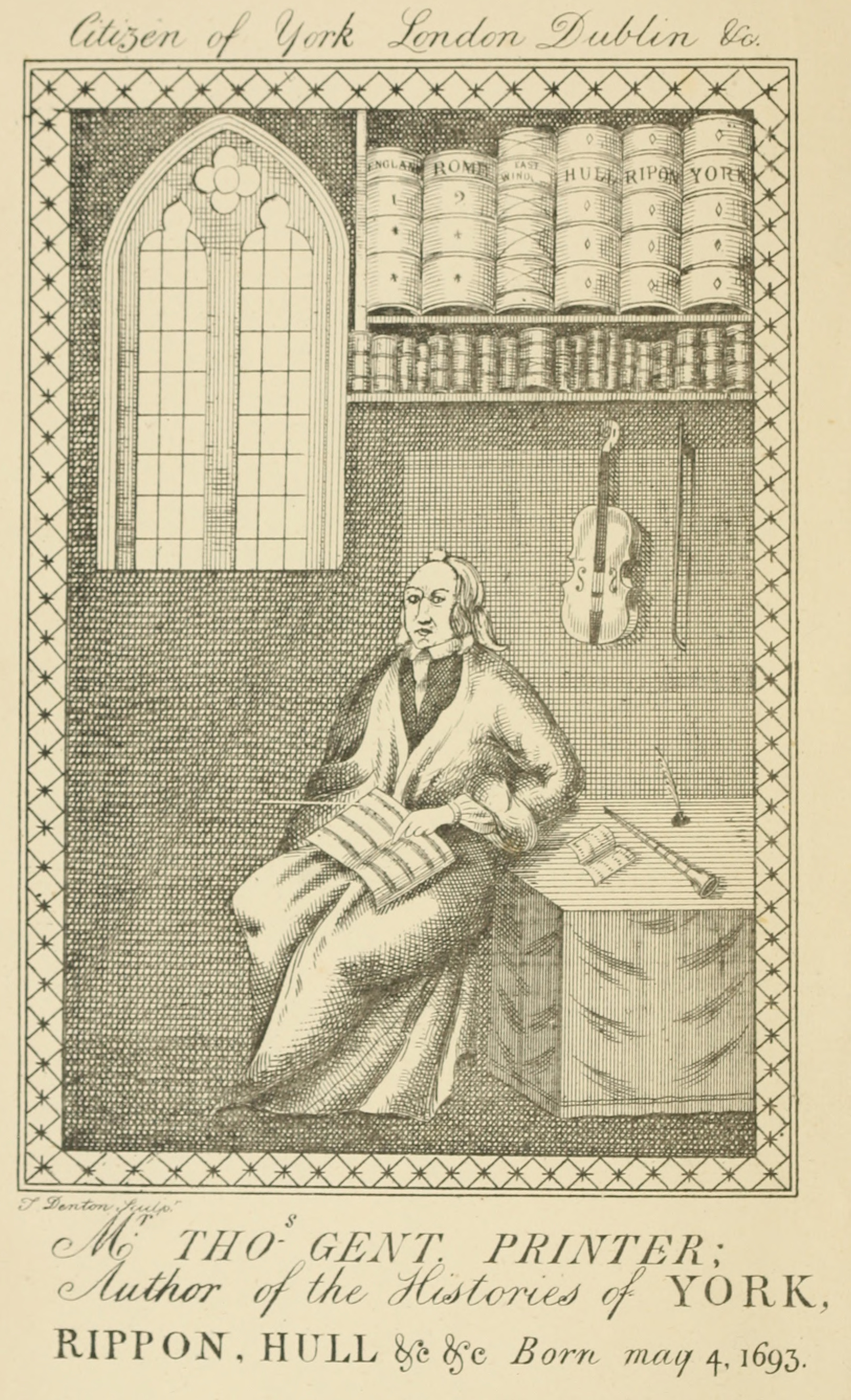
Thomas Gent

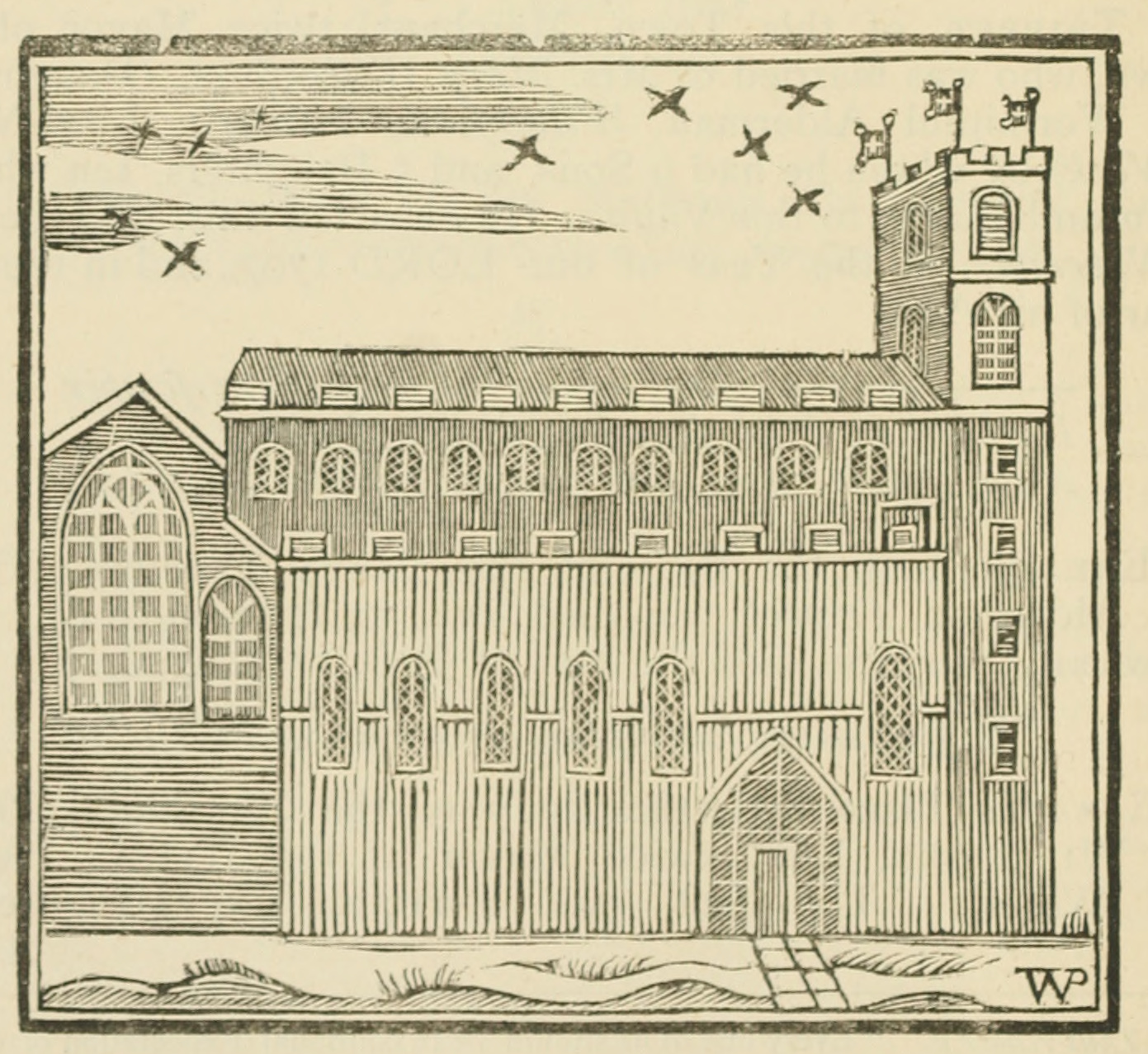
St. Mary Lowgate, Hull

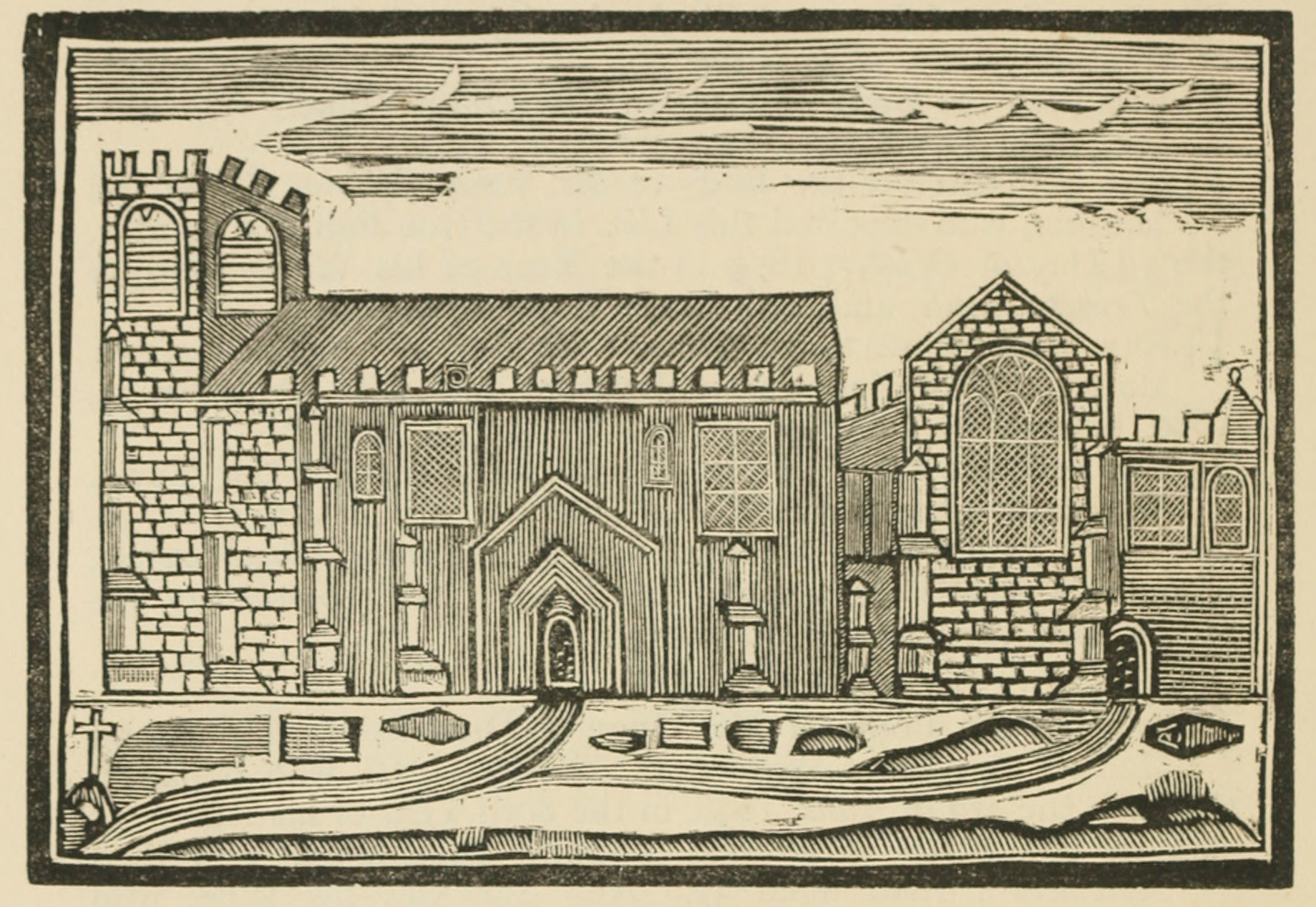
St. Mary's Whitby

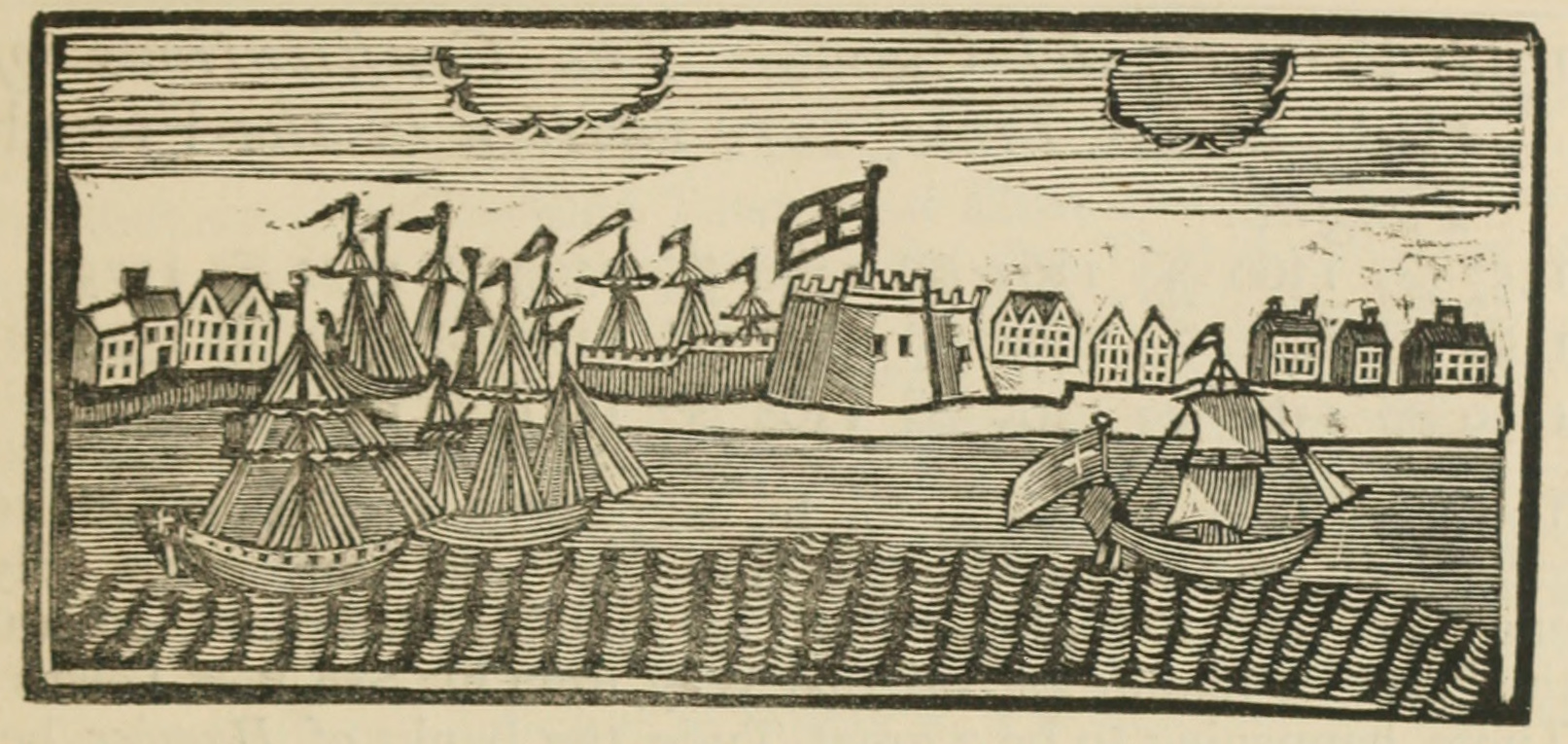
Hull from the Humber

== See also ==
- Newspapers of Yorkshire
