= Peter Toms (painter) =

English portrait and drapery painter

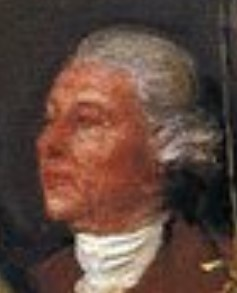
Peter Toms by Zoffany (1771/1772)

Peter Toms RA (fl. 1748, died 1 January 1777) was an English portrait and drapery painter, i.e. a painter specialising in depicting drapery for the works of other artists. He was a founding member of the Royal Academy. He was also the Portcullis Pursuivant at the College of Heralds.

== Life ==
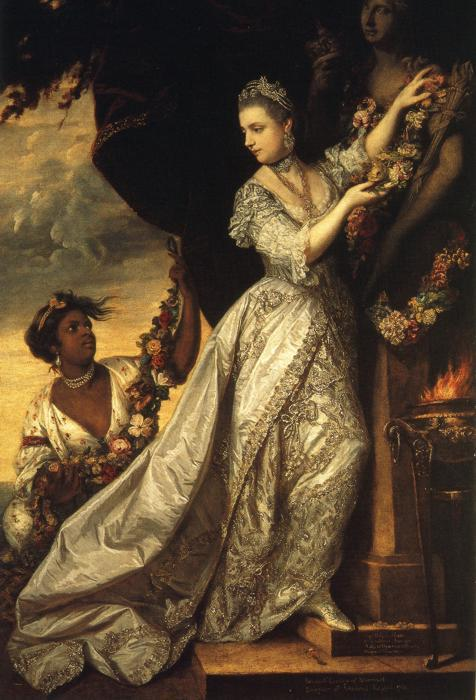
Reynolds' Portrait of Lady Elizabeth Keppel adorning a Herm of Hymen, the clothing painted by Toms.

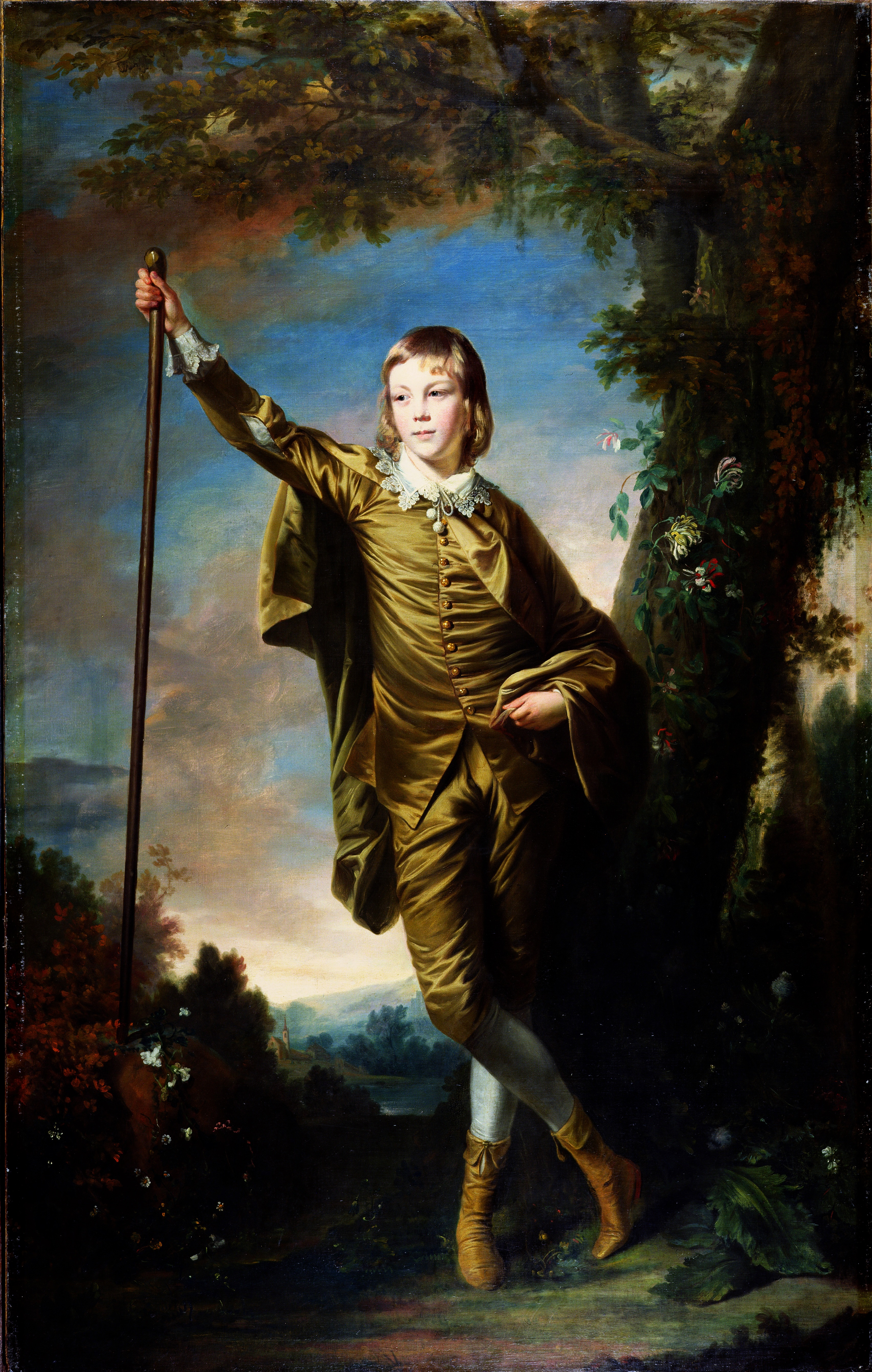
The Brown Boy by Reynolds, 1764, the dress painted by Toms

Toms was the son of an engraver, William Henry Toms, of Masham Street, Westminster. Apprenticed to the portraitist Thomas Hudson, he was by November 1748 described as an ‘eminent painter’. After the death in 1749 of Joseph van Aken, the leading drapery painter in England, he became a drapery-painter, and worked for Francis Cotes for several years. After Cotes' death, he was employed by Sir Joshua Reynolds, Allan Ramsay, Benjamin West and John Zoffany amongst others. He also practised as a portrait painter, but only a few works by him are known. He never exhibited his work at either the Society of Artists of Great Britain or the Free Society of Artists, the two principal exhibiting societies in London prior to the foundation of the Royal Academy. His absence suggests that he was happy to work for other artists rather than create his own paintings. He was appointed the Portcullis Pursuivant, i.e. a junior officer of arms at the College of Heralds.

According to Edward Edwards:

Among the pictures which he did for Sir Joshua, are some very excellent; and candour must allow, that many of Sir Joshua's best whole-lengths are those, to which Toms painted the draperies: Among these was the picture of Lady Elizabeth Keppel, in the dress she wore as bride-maid to the Queen; for which he was paid the sum of twelve guineas, a very slender price in proportion to the merit of the piece, but Sir Joshua was not remarkably liberal upon these occasions, of which circumstance Mr. Toms did not neglect to complain.

He is also believed to have made a major contribution to Reynolds' Master Thomas Lister (early 1760s; Bradford, Cartwright Hall). James Northcote called Toms a very good drapery painter but deemed his rather heavy manner not to be in harmony with Reynolds' style.

He was patronised by Hugh, Duke of Northumberland, who following his appointment as Lord Lieutenant of Ireland in 1763 invited Toms to join him in Dublin. Toms attempted unsuccessfully to find employment as a portrait painter in Dublin. After this failure, he returned to London to work almost exclusively until 1770 for Francis Cotes. There is evidence that he also assisted Thomas Gainsborough in the 1770s. Toms was a founding member of the Royal Academy in 1768, allegedly owing more to his relationships with Reynolds, Cotes and West than to his own reputation. He exhibited three works at the academy: "An allegorical picture". in 1769, "A portrait; half length" in 1779 and "The burdock and other wild plants; a specimen of a work to be published" in 1771.

Despite his success as a drapery painter, his heavy drinking and a lack of prudence in other respects, kept him poor, and prevented his advancement in the College of Heralds. He made a suicide attempt by cutting his own throat. He survived for several years, dying in poverty at his lodging in Rathbone Place in London, on 1 January 1777. He was buried in the cemetery of St. Giles-in-the-Fields.

He married Mary, daughter of Robert Hogg, of Kincardine. She died about three years before him, and was buried at Marylebone, the parish in which he lived many years.
