= John Boydell =

British publisher of engravings (1720–1804)

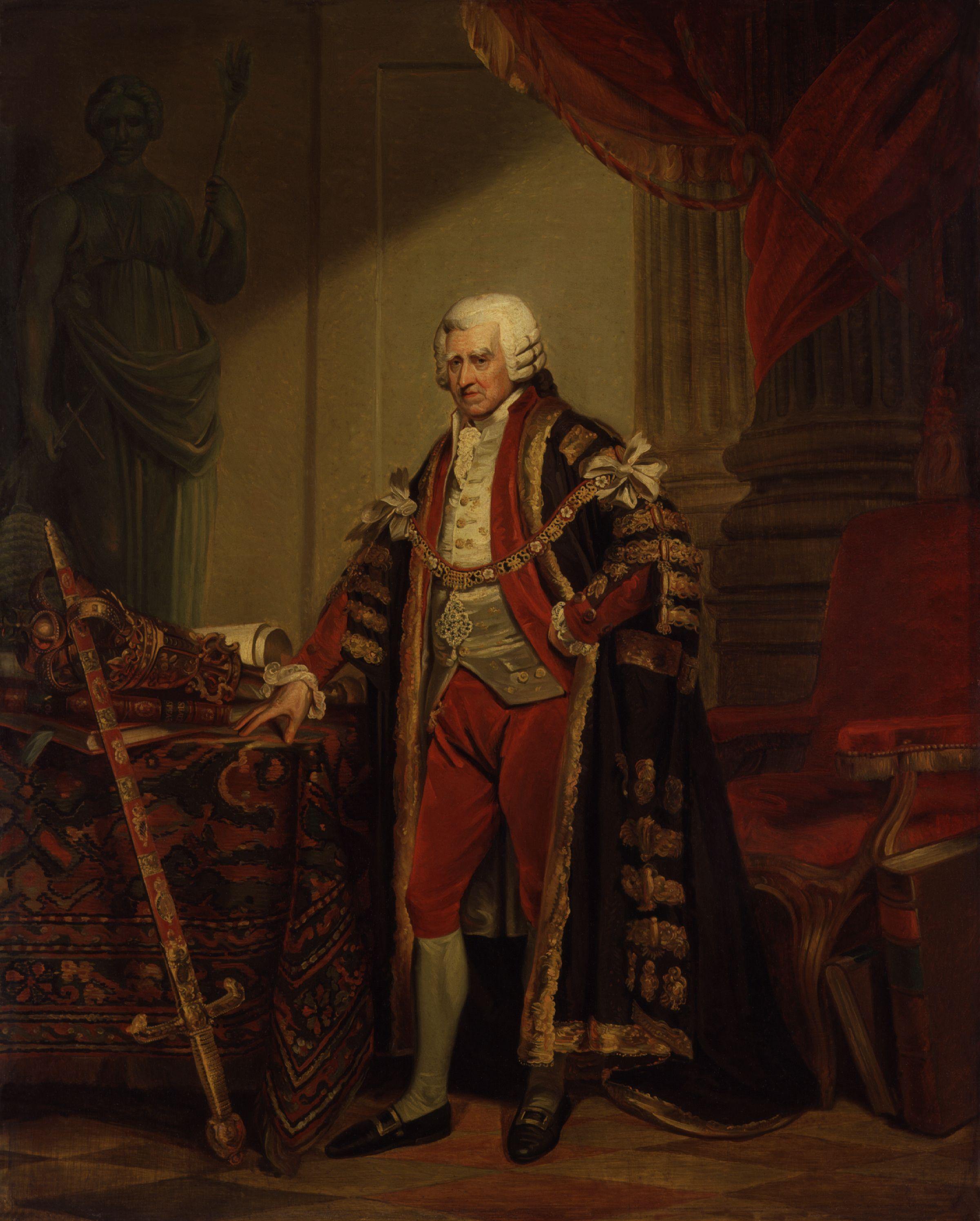
Portrait of John Boydell (1801), after William Beechey

John Boydell (/ˈbɔɪdəl/ BOY-dəl; 19 January 1720 [O.S. 8 January 1719] – 12 December 1804) was an English publisher noted for his reproductions of engravings. He helped alter the trade imbalance between Britain and France in engravings and initiated an English tradition in the art form. A former engraver himself, Boydell promoted the interests of artists as well as patrons and as a result his business prospered.

The son of a land surveyor, Boydell apprenticed himself to William Henry Toms, an artist he admired, and learned engraving. He established his own business in 1746 and published his first book of engravings around the same time. Boydell did not think much of his own artistic efforts and eventually started buying the works of others, becoming a print dealer as well as an artist. He became a successful importer of French prints during the 1750s but was frustrated by their refusal to trade prints in kind. To spark reciprocal trade, he commissioned William Wollett's spectacular engraving of Richard Wilson's The Destruction of the Children of Niobe, which revolutionised the print trade. Ten years later, largely as a result of Boydell's initiative, the trade imbalance had shifted, and he was named a fellow of the Royal Society for his efforts.

In the 1790s, Boydell began a large Shakespeare venture that included the establishment of a Shakespeare Gallery, the publication of an illustrated edition of Shakespeare's plays, and the release of a folio of prints depicting scenes from Shakespeare's works. Some of the most illustrious painters of the day contributed, such as Benjamin West and Henry Fuseli.

Throughout his life, Boydell dedicated time to civic projects: he donated art to government institutions and ran for public office. In 1790 he became Lord Mayor of London. The French Revolutionary Wars led to a cessation in Continental trade at the end of the 1790s. Without this business, Boydell's firm declined and he was almost bankrupt at his death in 1804.

== Early years ==
Boydell was born, according to his monument in St Olave Old Jewry, London (later removed to St Margaret Lothbury after St Olave's demolition), at Dorrington, in the parish of Woore, Shropshire, to Josiah and Mary Boydell (née Milnes), and was educated at least partially at Merchant Taylors' School. His father was a land surveyor and young Boydell, the oldest of seven children, was expected to follow in his footsteps. In 1731, when Boydell was eleven, the family moved to Hawarden, Flintshire. In 1739 he became house steward to MP John Lawton and accompanied him to London. A year later, like many other enterprising young men of the time, Boydell resolved to sail to the East Indies in hopes of making his fortune, but he abandoned the scheme in favour of returning to Flintshire and Elizabeth Lloyd, the woman he was courting. Whether or not he intended to pursue land surveying at this time is unclear.

In either 1740 or 1741, Boydell saw a print of Hawarden Castle by William Henry Toms and was so delighted with it that he immediately set out again for London to learn printmaking and Lloyd promised to wait for him. Boydell apprenticed himself to Toms and enrolled in St Martin's Lane Academy to learn drawing. Each day he worked about fourteen hours for Toms and then attended drawing classes at night. After six years, Boydell's diligence allowed him to buy out the last year of his apprenticeship, and in 1746 he set up an independent shop on the Strand that specialised in topographical prints that cost six pence for a cheap print or one shilling for an expensive print.

Boydell's willingness to assume responsibility for his own business so early in his career indicates that he had ambition and an enterprising spirit. Independent shops were risky in the 1740s because no strict copyright laws, other than the Engraving Copyright Act 1734 (8 Geo. 2. c. 13) (known as "Hogarth's Act"), had yet been instituted. The pirating of published books and prints became a profession in its own right and greatly decreased the profits of publishers such as Boydell.

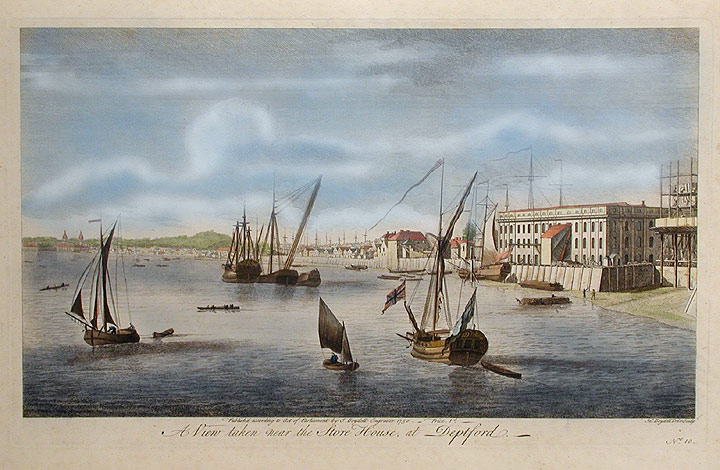
Boydell's "View taken near the Store House at Deptford", later published in his own Collection of Views in England and Wales (1770)

Around 1747, Boydell published his first major work, The Bridge Book, for which he drew and cut each print himself. It cost one shilling and contained six landscapes in each of which, not surprisingly, a bridge featured prominently. A year later, in 1748, Boydell, apparently financially secure, married Elizabeth Lloyd. The couple did not have any children and Elizabeth died in 1781.

Boydell realised early in his career that his engravings had little artistic merit, saying later that they were collected by others "more to show the improvement of art in this country [Britain], since the period of their publication, than from any idea of their own merits". This may explain why in 1751, when he became a member of the Stationers' Company, he started buying other artists' plates and publishing them in addition to his own. Ordinarily an engraver, such as William Hogarth, had his own shop or took his finished engravings to a publisher. In adopting the dual role of artist and print dealer, Boydell altered the traditional organisation of print shops. He was not subject to the whims of public taste: if his engravings did not sell well, he could supplement his earnings by trading in the prints of other artists. He also understood the concerns of both the engraver and the publisher. In fact, as a publisher, he did much to help raise the level of respect for engravers in addition to furnishing them with better paying commissions.

== Success ==
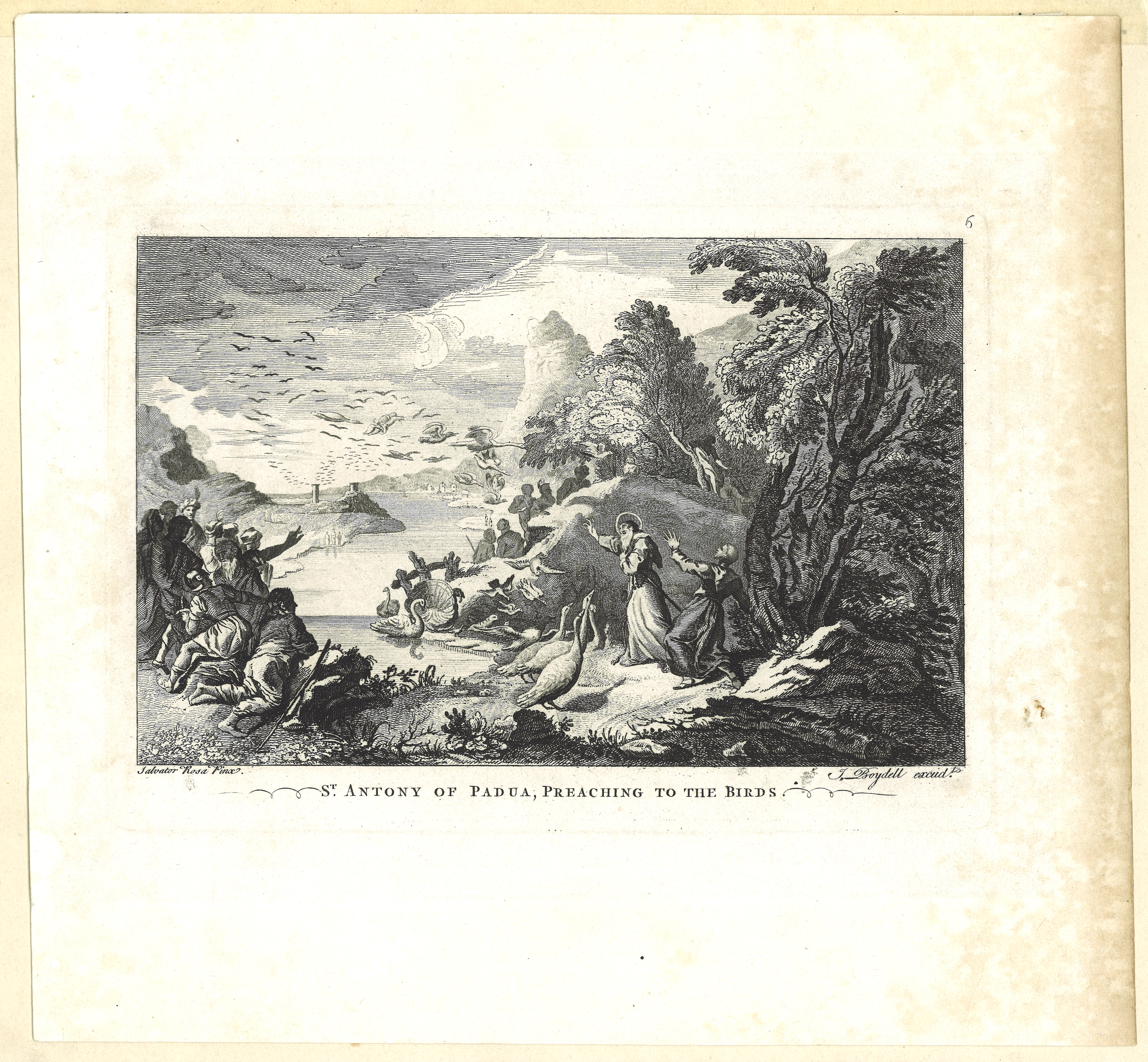
St. Antony of Padua, preaching to the Birds. Wood engraving after Salvator Rosa

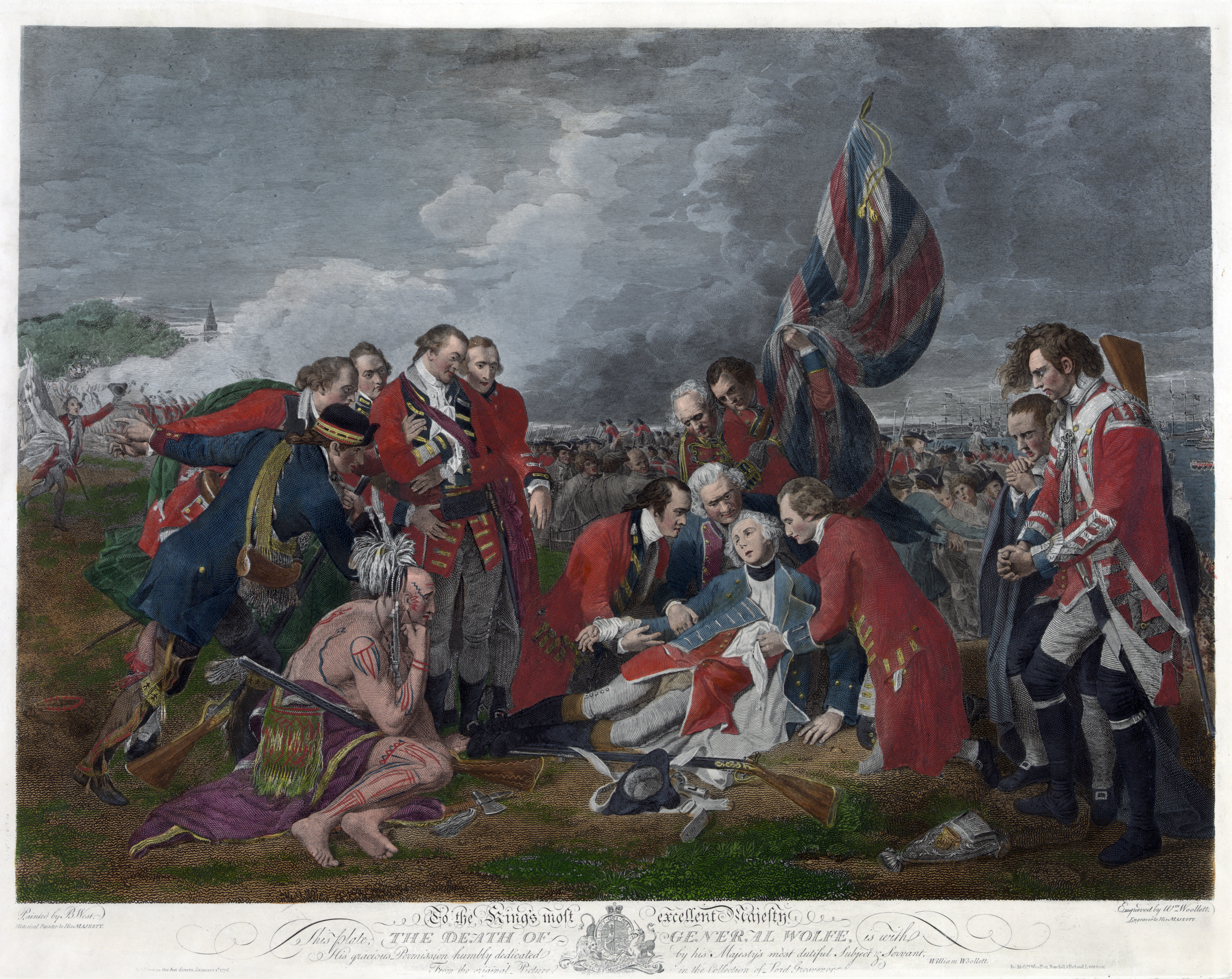
Boydell eventually made £15,000 from William Woollett's 1776 print of Benjamin West's Death of General Wolfe (1770), much of it from exports.

In 1751, with his large volume of prints, Boydell moved to larger premises at 90 Cheapside. By 1755, he had published A Collection of One Hundred and Two Views, &C. in England and Wales. This cheap but successful book gave him capital to invest. He became increasingly immersed in the commercial side of the print business and like most print dealers began importing prints to sell. These included print reproductions of landscapes by artists such as Claude Lorrain and Salvator Rosa. The bulk of the imports came from the undisputed masters of engraving during the 18th century: the French. Boydell made a small fortune in the 1750s from these imported prints. His early success was acknowledged in 1760 when he was accepted as a member of the Society of Arts. Winifred Friedman, who has written extensively on Boydell, explains that despite this success, "[w]hat rankled Boydell was that the French would not extend credit, or exchange prints; he was required to produce hard cash. Boydell took action, and this was the turning point."

In 1761, Boydell decided that he would attempt to trade with the French in kind—something they had refused in the past because of the poor quality of British engravings. To inaugurate this change, he had to have a truly spectacular print. To this end, he hired William Woollett, the foremost engraver in England, to engrave Richard Wilson's Destruction of the Children of Niobe. Woollett had already successfully engraved Claude Lorrain's 1663 painting The Father of Psyche Sacrificing at the Temple of Apollo for Boydell in 1760. Boydell paid him approximately £100 for the Niobe engraving, a staggering amount compared to the usual rates. This single act of patronage raised engravers' fees throughout London. The print was wildly successful, but more importantly, the French accepted it as payment in kind. In fact, it was the first British print actively desired on the Continent. By 1770, the British were exporting far more prints than they were importing, largely due to Boydell.

Boydell's business flourished and he soon hired his nephew, Josiah Boydell, to assist him. Boydell's biographer, Sven Bruntjen, hypothesizes that one of the reasons for Boydell's early and phenomenal success was his specialisation. Unlike "his competitors [who sold manuals, atlases and other assorted books] ... his [business had an] almost exclusive concentration on the sale of reproductive prints". Bruntjen argues that "despite the extensive sales of varied types of reproductive prints, it was the contemporary history print which accounted for the major part of Boydell's success as a print dealer". Most notable among these was the Death of General Wolfe a 1770 painting by Benjamin West, engraved by Woollett for Boydell in 1776. As early as 1767, Boydell had stopped engraving prints himself and began exclusively relying on commissions and trades and it was from these that he profited.

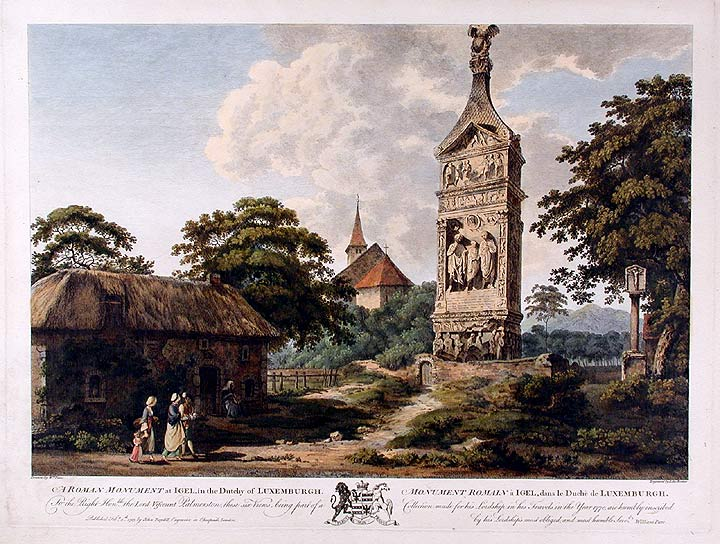
A Roman Monument at Igel in the Dutchy of Luxemburgh, coloured engraving published by John Boydell, London (1783) from a painting by Edward Rooker (1712?–1774) after William Pars (1742–1782)

Boydell had opened up a new market with Niobe and he quickly followed up this success. With a prospering business and capital in reserve, he embarked on several ambitious projects, often simultaneously. In 1769, he began A Collection of Prints, Engraved after the Most Capital Paintings in England. Its last, and ninth volume, was finished in 1792 to great critical and financial success. In 1773, he began A Set of Prints Engraved after the Most Capital Paintings in the Collection of Her Imperial Majesty the Empress of Russia, Lately in the Possession of the Earl of Orford at Houghton in Norfolk, which was finished in 1788.

In addition to these projects and in the middle of his Shakespeare undertaking Boydell experimented with aquatint in An History of the River Thames, published in 1796. Bruntjen writes, "although not the first colored aquatint book, [it] was the first major one, and it was to set an example for the type of illustration that was to enjoy widespread popularity in England for some forty years". Boydell also published The Original Work of William Hogarth in 1790 and The Poetical Works of John Milton and The Life of the Poet (i.e., Milton) in 1794.

The productivity and profitability of Boydell's firm spurred the British print industry in general. By 1785, annual exports of British prints reached £200,000 while imports fell to £100. Boydell was acknowledged and praised throughout England as the agent of this stunning economic reversal. In 1773 he was awarded the Royal Academy Gold Medal for his services in advancing the print trade. In 1789, at the Royal Academy dinner, the Prince of Wales toasted "an English tradesman who patronizes art better than the Grand Monarque, Alderman Boydell, the Commercial Maecenas".

== Shakespeare venture ==
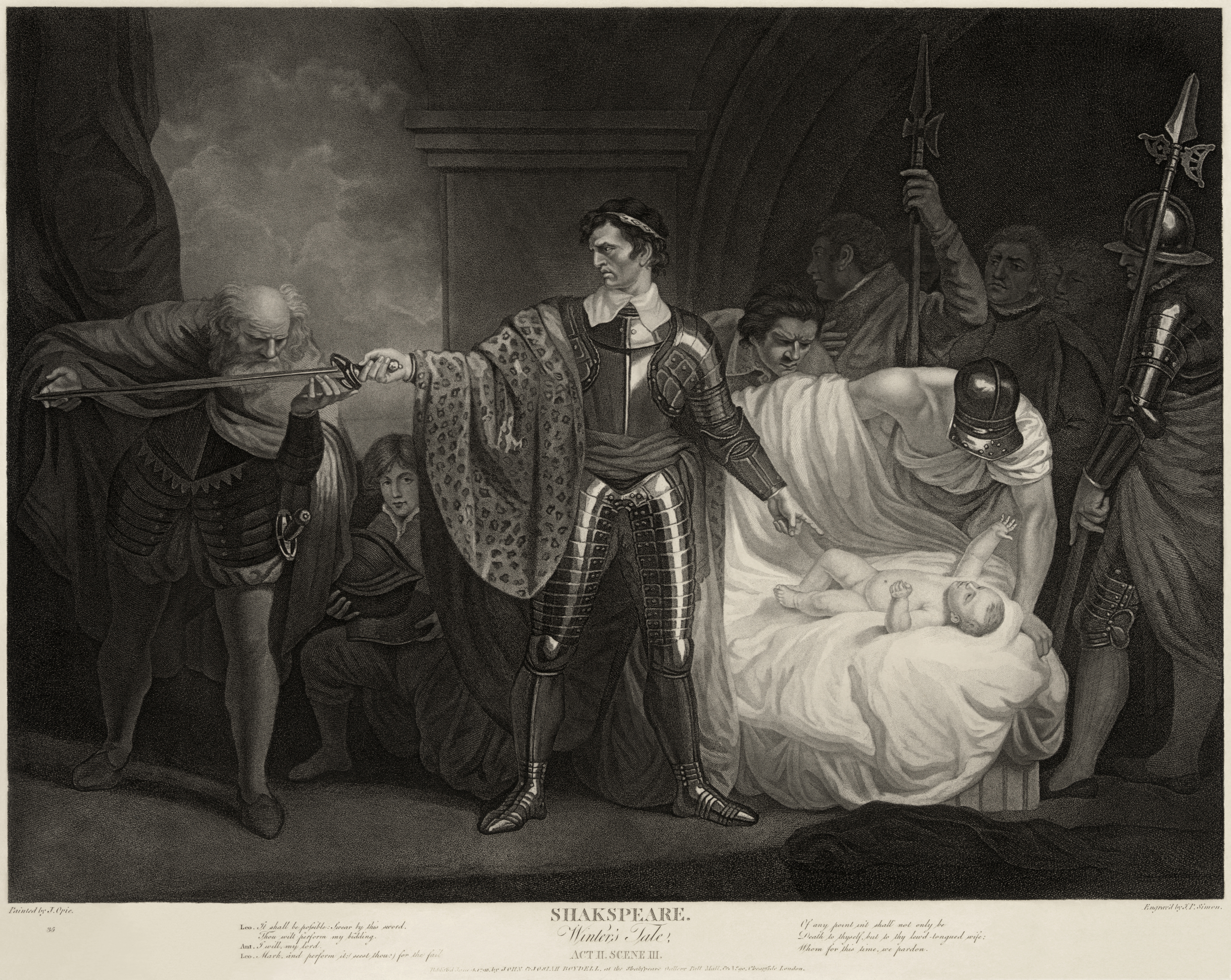
The Winter's Tale, Act II, scene 3, from a painting by John Opie commissioned and prepared for engraving by the Shakespeare Gallery.

Boydell's crowning achievement was his Shakespeare project, which was to occupy much of the last two decades of his life. The project contained three parts: an illustrated edition of Shakespeare's plays, a public gallery of paintings depicting scenes from the plays, and a folio of prints based on the paintings.

The idea of a grand Shakespeare edition was conceived at a dinner at Josiah Boydell's home in November 1786. The guest list itself is evidence of Boydell's extensive connections in the artistic world: Benjamin West, painter to King George III; George Romney, a renowned painter; George Nicol, bookseller to the king and painter; William Hayley, a poet; John Hoole, a scholar and translator of Tasso and Aristotle; and Daniel Braithwaite, an engineer. Most sources also list the painter Paul Sandby. Although the initial idea for the edition was probably not Boydell's, he was the one to seize and pursue it. He wanted to use the edition to facilitate the development of a British school of history painting.

The "magnificent and accurate" Shakespeare edition which Boydell began in 1786 was the focus of the enterprise. The print folio and the gallery were simply offshoots of the main project. In an advertisement prefacing the first volume of the edition, Nicol wrote that "splendor and magnificence, united with correctness of text were the great objects of this Edition". Boydell was responsible for the "splendor", and George Steevens, a renowned Shakespearean editor, was responsible for the "correctness of text". The volumes themselves were handsome, with gilded pages. Even the quality of the paper was extraordinarily high. The illustrations were printed independently and could be inserted and removed as the customer desired. The first volumes of the Dramatick Works were published in 1791 and the last in 1805. The edition was financed through a subscription campaign in which the buyers would offer partial payment up front and then pay the remaining sum on delivery. This practice was necessitated by the fact that over £350,000—an enormous sum at the time—was eventually spent on the enterprise.

When it opened on 4 May 1789 at 52 Pall Mall, the Shakespeare Gallery contained 34 paintings and by the end of its run it had between 167 and 170. The gallery itself was a hit with the public and became a fashionable attraction. It took over the public's imagination and became an end in and of itself.

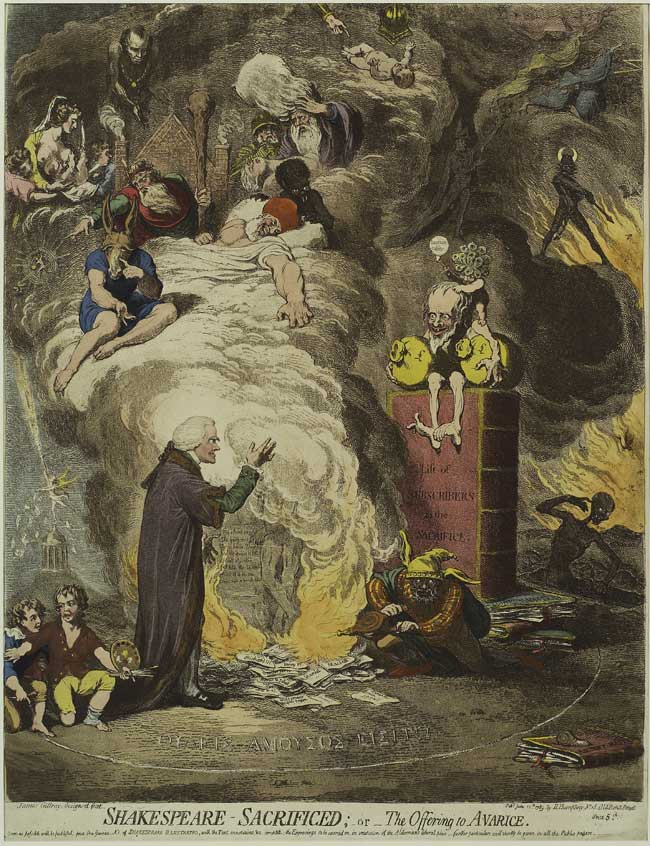
James Gillray, passed over for the Shakespeare Gallery engravings, responded with Shakespeare Sacrificed: Or the Offering to Avarice.

To illustrate the edition and to provide images for the folio, Boydell obtained the assistance of the most eminent painters and engravers of the day. Artists included Richard Westall, Thomas Stothard, George Romney, Henry Fuseli, Benjamin West, Angelica Kauffman, Robert Smirke, John Opie, and Boydell's nephew and business partner, Josiah Boydell. Among the engravers were Francesco Bartolozzi and Thomas Kirk. Boydell's relationships with his artists, particularly his illustrators, was generally congenial. James Northcote praised Boydell's liberal payments. He wrote in an 1821 letter that Boydell "did more for the advancement of the arts in England than the whole mass of the nobility put together! He paid me more nobly than any other person has done; and his memory I shall every hold in reverence".

At the beginning of the enterprise, reactions were generally positive. Two reviews from the most influential newspapers in London at the time solidified and validated the public's interest in the project and the artists' efforts. However, there was also some criticism. In particular the satirical engraver James Gillray appears to have been peeved at not being commissioned to engrave any of the Shakespeare scenes and, in revenge, published Shakespeare Sacrificed: Or the Offering to Avarice just six weeks after the gallery opened. Gillray followed up with further cartoons such as Boydell sacrificing the Works of Shakespeare to the Devil of Money-Bags. As the project dragged on, the criticism increased. Yet, Boydell's project still inspired imitators. Thomas Macklin attempted to found a Poet's Gallery similar to the Shakespeare Gallery and several histories of England on the scale of the Shakespeare edition were also started. However, like Boydell's venture, they ultimately ended in financial disaster.

The folio, which collected together the engravings from the paintings, has been the most lasting legacy of the Boydell enterprise: it was reissued throughout the 19th century and scholars have described it as a precursor to the modern coffee table book.

== Civic service ==
Amidst all of the work generated by these publishing enterprises, Boydell still found time to be alderman of Cheap ward in 1782, master of the Stationers' Company in 1783, sheriff of London in 1785, and Lord Mayor of London in 1790. With both a dedicated civic spirit and an eye towards business promotion, Boydell took advantage of his public positions to advocate public and private patronage of the arts. He frequently donated paintings from his own collections to the Corporation of London to be hung in the Guildhall. He hoped that his donation might spur others to similar generosity. However, he remained a solitary contributor. A catalogue was published in 1794 listing all of the works Boydell had donated to the Guildhall. In the preface, he explained why he had made such large gifts:

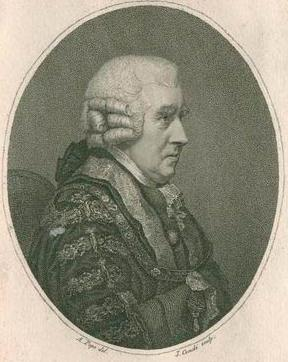
John Boydell shown in 1791 during his year as Lord Mayor of London

It may be a matter of wonder to some, what enducements I could have to present the City of London with so many expensive Pictures; the principal reasons that influence me were these: First: to show my respect for the Corporation, and my Fellow Citizens, Secondly: to give pleasure to the Public, and Foreigners in general, Thirdly: to be of service to the Artists, by shewing their works to the greatest advantage: and, Fourthly: for the mere purpose of pleasing myself.

In 1794 Boydell commissioned and donated Industry and Prudence by Robert Smirke. Most of the other works Boydell donated were similarly didactic. He was appealing to his fellow tradespeople and craftspeople with these gifts, a middle class which would have been only too pleased to see their values promoted by such a prominent figure.

In a speech before the Council to advocate the renovation of a building for the purpose of displaying public art, Boydell made the striking claim that if the rich could be persuaded to patronise art, they would forgo their wicked ways:

one might be found amongst the many spendthrifts of the present age, instead of ruining themselves by gaming, or laying snares to debauch young Females, by their false promises and many other bad vices; would be rejoiced at such an opportunity, of reclaiming themselves by withdrawing from the snares laid for them by bad and designing Men and Women, who constantly lay wait to lead astray the young and unwary that are possessed of large property, such might here have the pleasure and satisfaction to make a real Paradise on earth, by illuminating a place that would for ever shine and display their generosity.

Boydell's middle-class consumers would have approved of his connection between morality and art.

== Business decline, death, and legacy ==
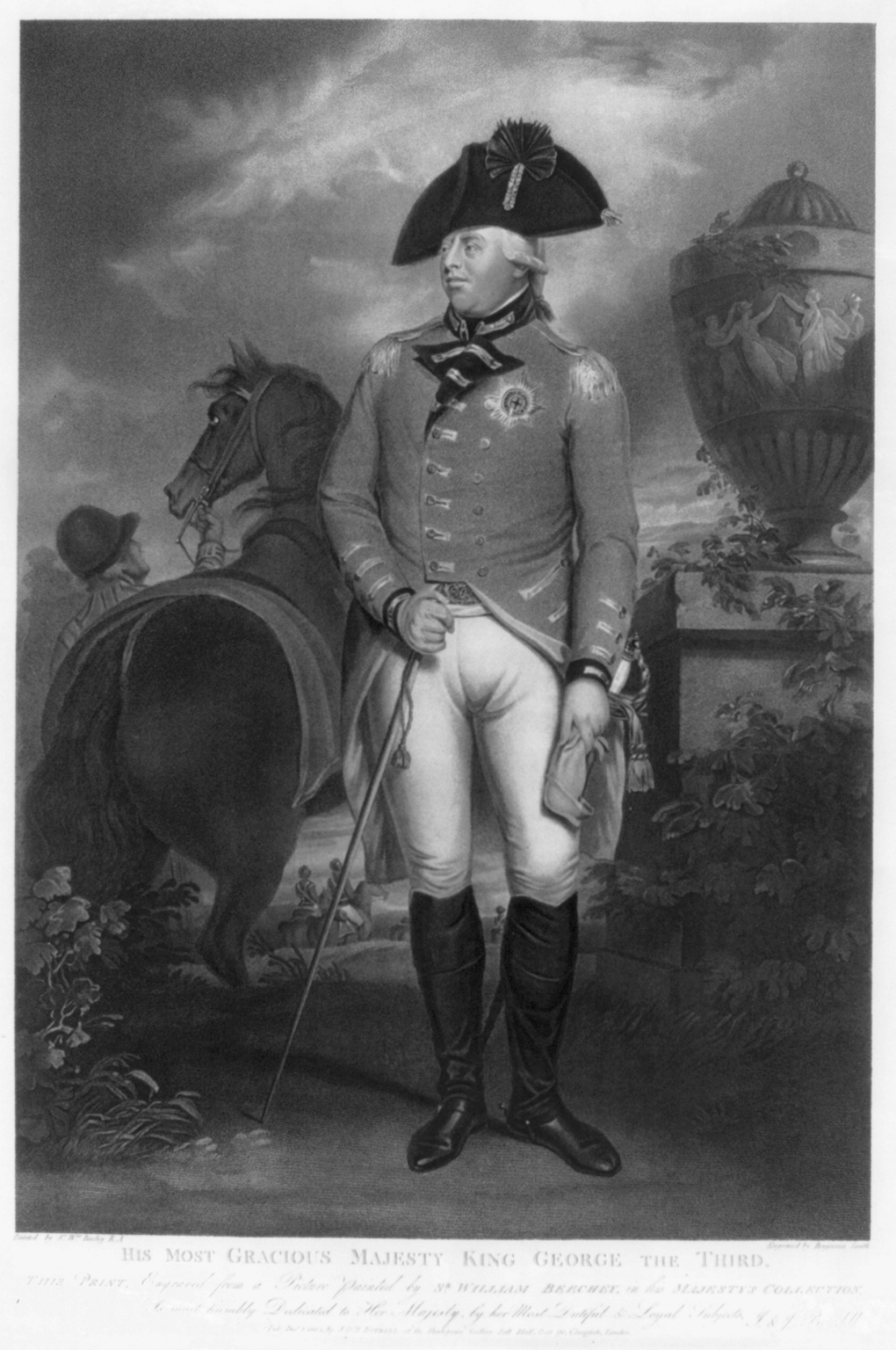
This engraving of King George III (based on a painting by William Beechey in the Royal Collection) was published by Boydell's company on 1 December 1804, 11 days before Boydell's death. The company's address is still given as "the Shakespeare Gallery, Pall Mall and at 90 Cheapside"

In 1789, the French Revolution broke out and four years later war erupted between Britain and France. Throughout the next tumultuous decade, trade with Europe became increasingly difficult. As Boydell's business relied heavily on foreign trade, especially French, his livelihood was threatened. When this market was cut off due to war in 1793, Boydell's business declined substantially. He was forced to sell the Shakespeare Gallery, via a lottery, in order for his business to remain solvent. He died in December 1804 before the lottery was drawn, but after all of its 22,000 tickets had been sold.

According to Josiah, John Boydell caught a cold by going to the Old Bailey on a damp, foggy day to do his duty as an alderman. He died on 12 December 1804 almost bankrupt, but not without great public acclaim. He was buried on 19 December 1804 at the Church of St. Olave Old Jewry, his funeral attended by the Lord Mayor, aldermen, and several artists.

Boydell had, almost single-handedly, made British prints a viable economic commodity and had demolished the French domination of the trade. In a letter to Sir John Anderson, asking Parliament for the private Lottery Act to sell off the Shakespeare Gallery, Boydell stated that it was "sufficient to say, that the whole course of that commerce [print trade] is changed". The Times wrote on 7 May 1789: "Historical painting and engraving are almost exclusively indebted to Mr. Boydell for their present advancement." Boydell also played a part in changing the nature of art patronage in Britain. Until he advocated public patronage in his various civic posts, the government had little to do with British art. According to Bruntjen, "it was due to the enthusiasm of Boydell and others that the English government eventually provided funds for the establishment of the National Gallery in 1824". Boydell helped to make artists independent of aristocratic patronage by providing commercial opportunities for them. He "attempted to free artists from the traditional forms of state and aristocratic patronage by creating a public taste for reproductive prints of historical subjects". Boydell's entry in the Dictionary of National Biography ends with the assessment that "no print publisher before or since has ever exerted as much influence on the course of British art".

Boydell's nephew and business partner, Josiah Boydell, continued his uncle's business for some time at 90 Cheapside, but by 1818, the business was wound up by Jane Boydell, and the assets purchased by Hurst, Robinson, and Co.
