= William Henry Toms =

English engraver

- Born: c. 1700
- Died: 12 September 1765; Westminster, England
- Occupation: Engraver
- Children: Peter Toms

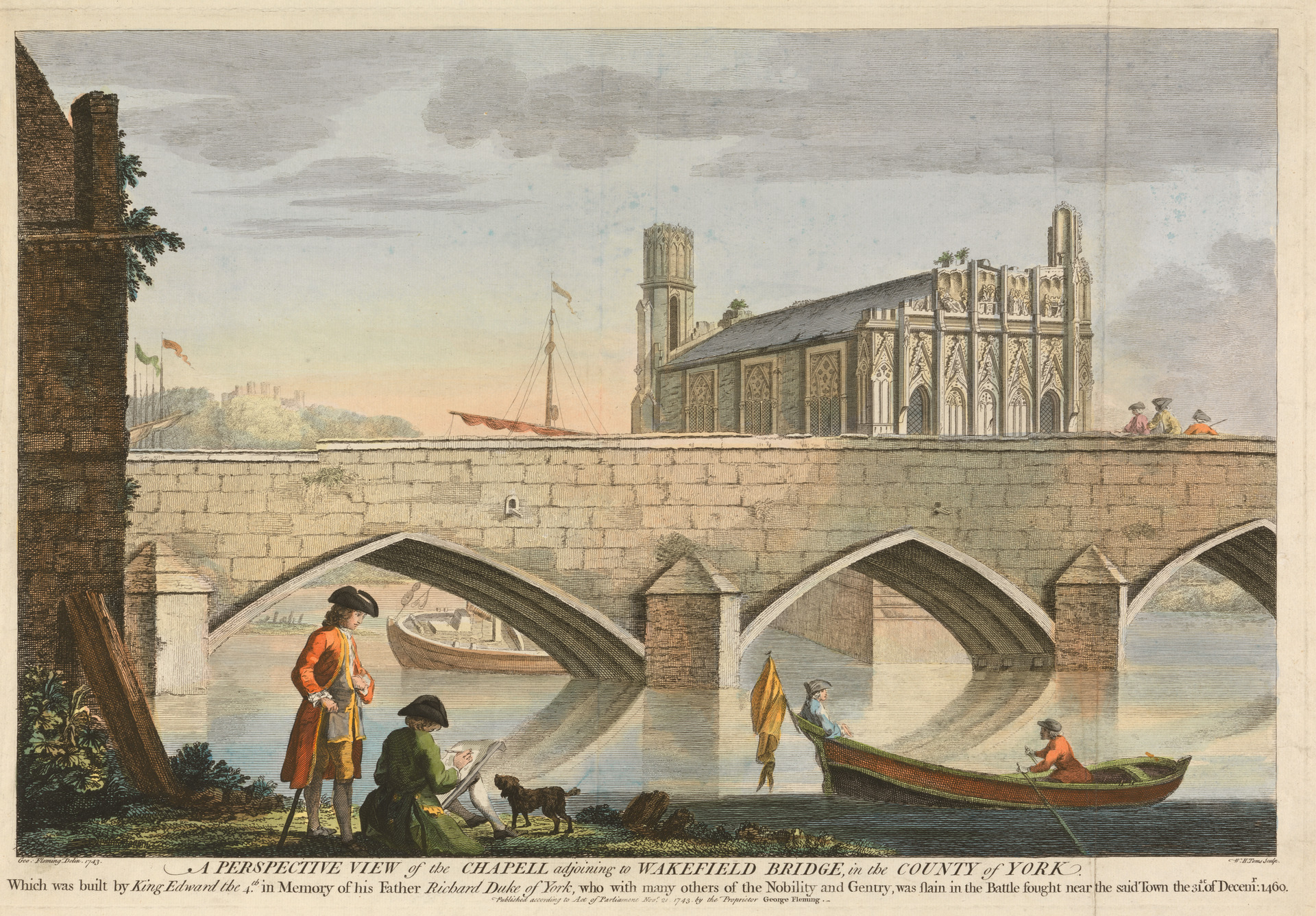
A Perspective View of the Chapel Adjoining Wakefield Bridge, coloured engraving, William Henry Toms, 1743.

Bethlehem Hospital by Toms for William Maitland's History of London, published 1739.

William Henry Toms (c. 1700–1765) was an English engraver. He worked on portraits, book-plates, landscapes and prints of buildings. Among his works were the plates for Robert West's "Perspective Views of All the Ancient Churches in London" (1736–1739). In 1741, he worked with Thomas Badeslade on "Chorographia Britanniae or a New Set of Maps of all the Counties in England and Wales". The maps were republished on 29 September 1742, with additional place names.

Among Toms's apprentices was the engraver and publisher John Boydell. W. H. Toms lived in Masham Street, London, and was the father of the painter Peter Toms. Toms died in 1765.
