= William Woollett =

English engraver (1735–1785)

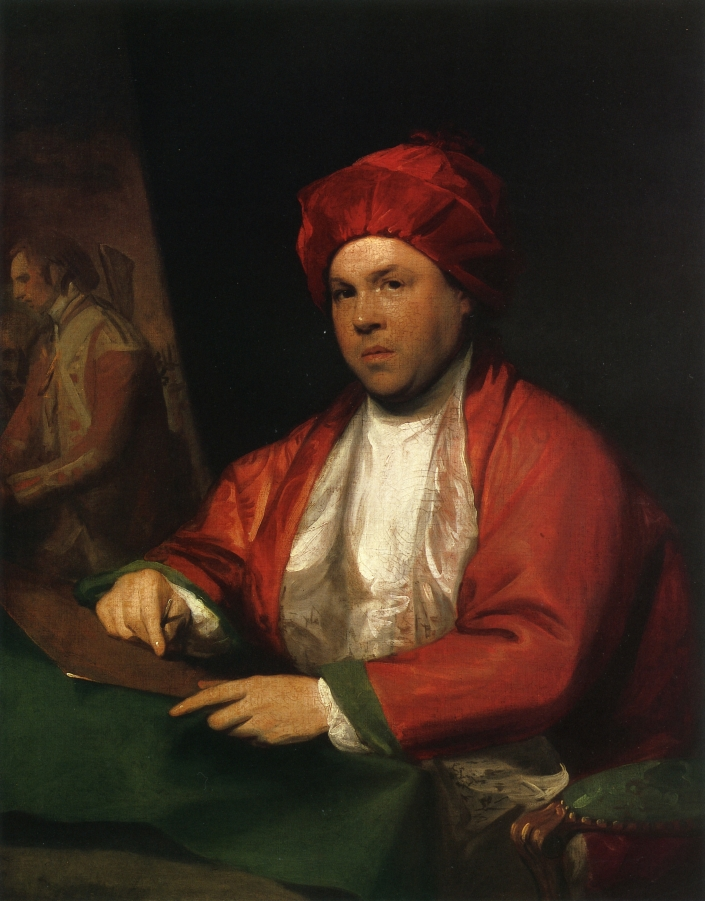
1783 portrait of Woollett by Gilbert Stuart

William Woollett (15 August 1735 – 23 May 1785) was an English engraver.

== Life ==
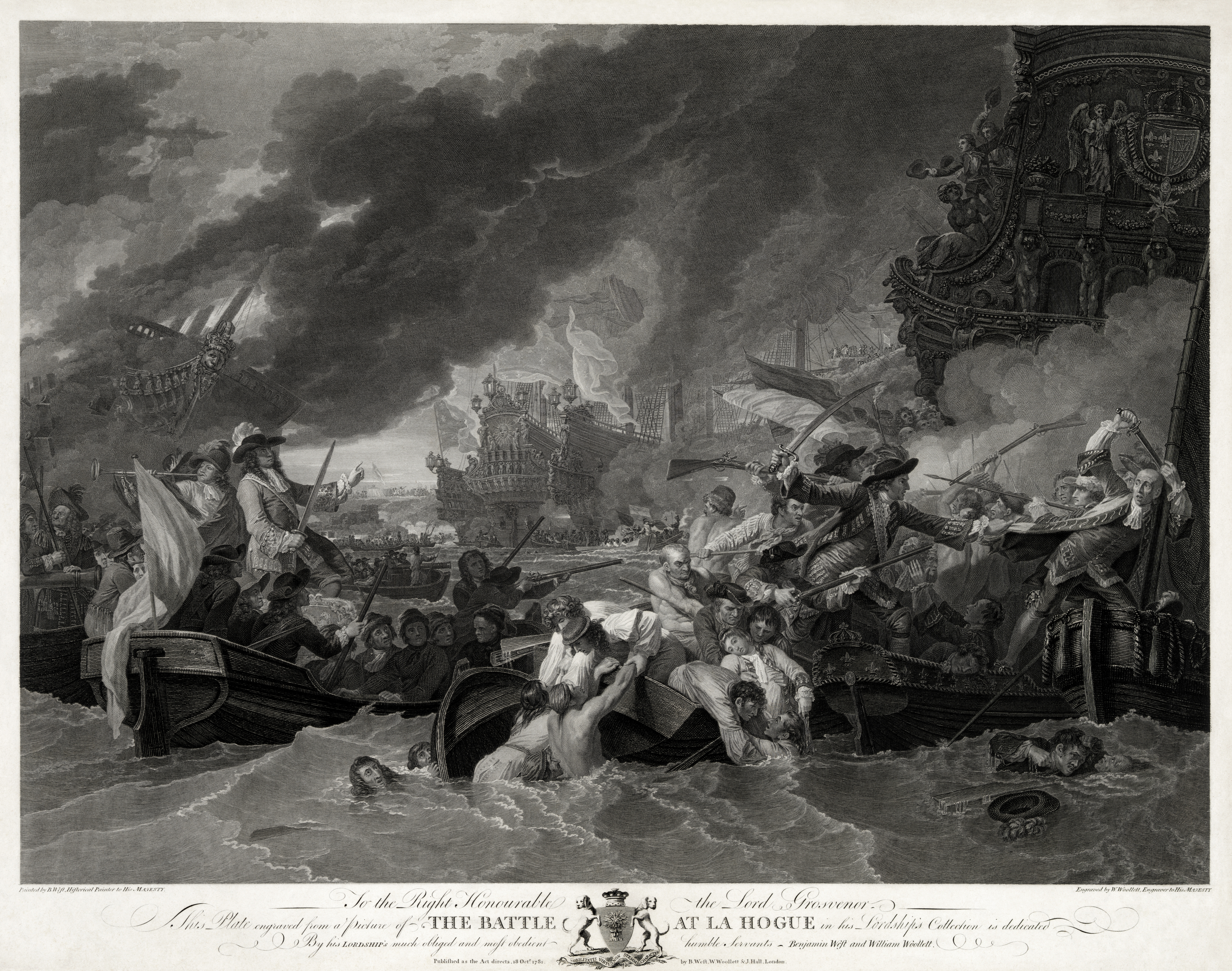
Woollett's 1781 engraving of Benjamin West's 1778 painting The Battle of La Hogue

Woollett was born on 15 August 1735 in Maidstone, Kent to a family had originally emigrated to England from the Dutch Republic. He was apprenticed to John Tinney, an engraver in Fleet Street, London, and studied in the St Martin's Lane academy. His first important plate was from The Destruction of the Children of Niobe of Richard Wilson, published by Boydell in 1761, which was followed in 1763 by a companion engraving from the "Phaethon" of the same painter. He engraved several Benjamin West paintings, including The Death of General Wolfe in 1776 and The Battle of La Hogue in 1781, the former of which is usually considered Woollett's masterpiece. In 1775 he was appointed engraver-in-ordinary to George III; and he was a member of the Incorporated Society of Artists, of which for several years he acted as secretary.

Woollett's plates combined engraving, etching, and dry-point and were considered highly esteemed examples of the English school of engraving. Louis Fagan, in his Catalogue Raisonné of the Engraved Works of William Woollett (1885), enumerated 123 plates by Woollett. Thomas Hearne became apprenticed to him in 1765, Woollett came to consider him the finest landscape engraver of his day; he stayed for six years. Benjamin Thomas Pouncy (B.T. Pouncy) (died 1799), was a pupil. He died in London; his is one of the many graves in Old St. Pancras Churchyard. He is not listed on the memorial to important lost graves erected in the 19th century.

== Memorials ==
A monument to his memory, by Thomas Banks, stands in Westminster Abbey.
