= 1761 in art =

Events from the year 1761 in art.

== Events ==
- May 9 – Society of Artists of Great Britain's Exhibition of 1761 opens in Spring Gardens, London. Exhibitors include Gainsborough, Hogarth and Nollekens, and Stubbs shows a painting for the first time (A Stallion Called Romulus).
- Salon of 1761 is held at the Louvre in Paris
- Scottish-born artist Allan Ramsay appointed to succeed John Shackelton as Principal Painter in Ordinary to George III of Great Britain.

== Works ==
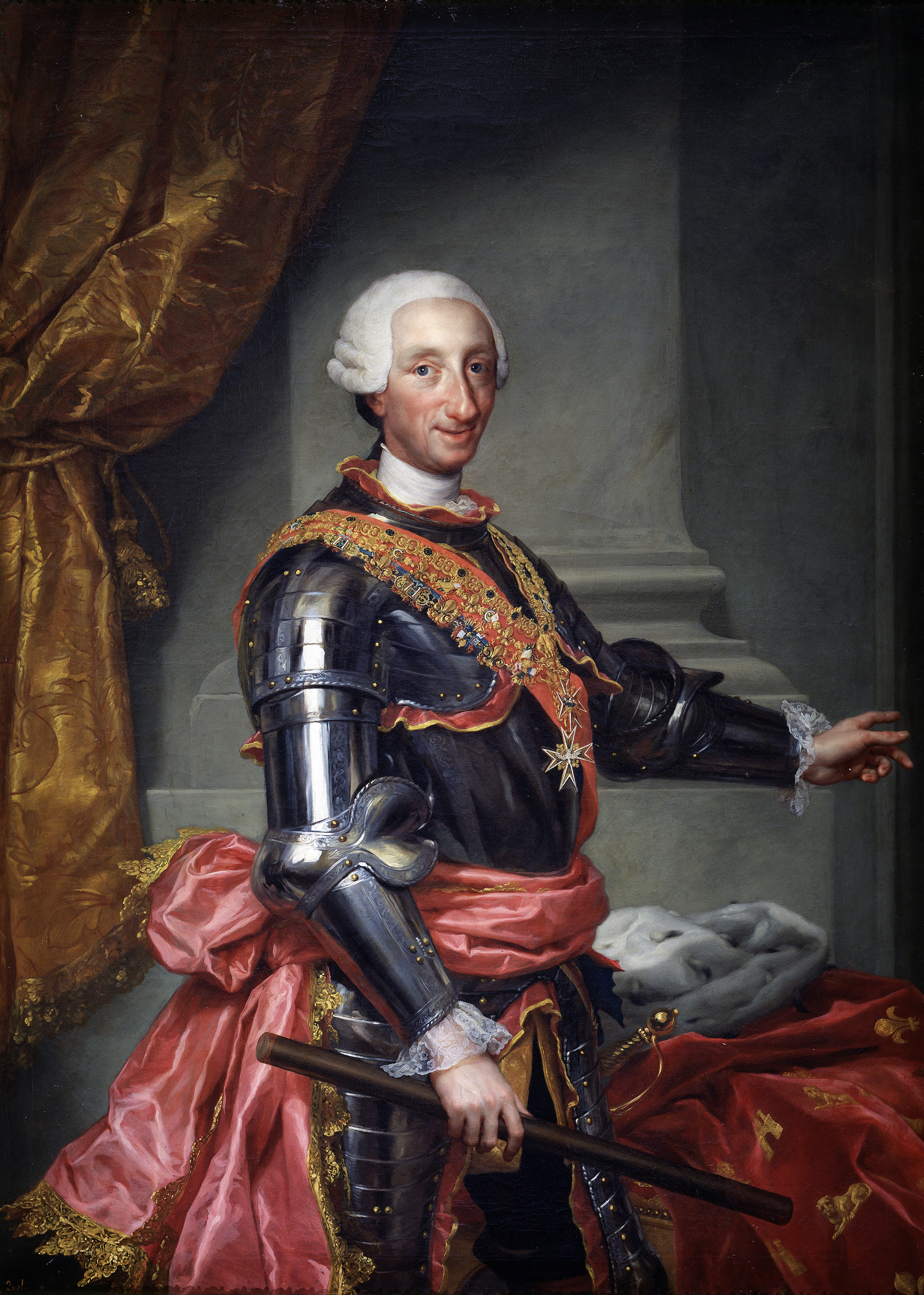
Portrait of Charles III of Spain by Anton Raphael Mengs

- François-Hubert Drouais – The children of the comte de Bethune playing the guitar
- Thomas Gainsborough – Portrait of Susannah "Suky" Trevelyan
- William Hogarth – The Five Orders of Perriwigs as they were Worn at the Late Coronation Measured Architectonically (satirical engraving)
- Anton Raphael Mengs
  - Parnassus (ceiling fresco for Villa Albani, Rome)
  - Portrait of Charles III of Spain
- Joshua Reynolds
  - David Garrick Between Tragedy and Comedy
  - Georgiana, Countess Spencer, and Her Daughter
  - The Ladies Amabel and Mary Jemima Yorke (probable date)
- Louis-François Roubiliac – Memorials to Handel and Lady Elizabeth Nightingale in Westminster Abbey
- Richard Wilson
  - Syon House from Richmond Gardens
  - The Valley of the Dee, with Chester in the Distance

== Births ==
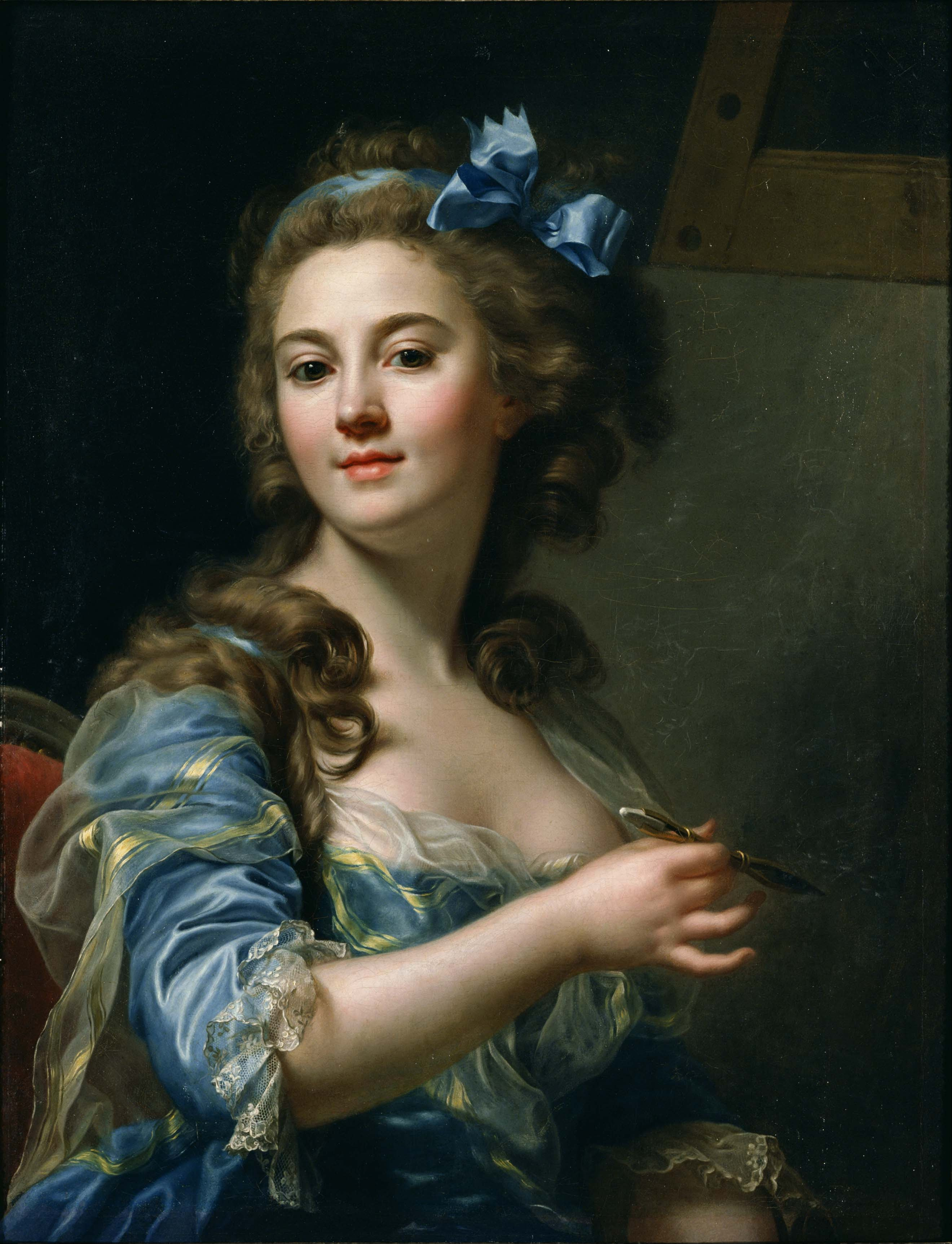
Marie-Gabrielle Capet (1761–1818)

- January 24 – Johann Christian Reinhart, German painter and etcher (died 1847)
- January 28 – Marguerite Gérard, French painter and etcher (died 1837)
- March – John Laporte, English landscape painter and etcher (died 1839)
- April 10 – Jacques-Edme Dumont, French sculptor (died 1844)
- May 16 – John Opie, Cornish historical and portrait painter (died 1807)
- June 29 – Jacques Kuyper, Dutch printmaker, painter, draftsman, watercolourist, etcher, musician, and composer (died 1808)
- July 5 – Louis-Léopold Boilly, French painter (died 1845)
- October 11 – Mather Brown, American-born portrait and historical painter (died 1831)
- October 21 – Louis Albert Guislain Bacler d'Albe, French artist, map-maker and close strategic advisor of Napoleon (died 1824)
- September 6 – Marie-Gabrielle Capet, French painter (died 1818)
- November 4 – Bertrand Andrieu, French engraver and medalist (died 1822)
- December 1 – Marie Tussaud, French-born wax modeller of the Madame Tussauds Wax Museum (died 1850)
- date unknown
  - Jan Frans Eliaerts, Flemish painter of animals, flowers and fruit (died 1848)
  - William Fowler, English artist (died 1832)
  - Charles Hayter, English painter (died 1835)
  - Sakai Hōitsu, Japanese painter of the Rinpa school (died 1828)
  - Zhang Yin, Chinese calligrapher and painter of Qing Dynasty (died 1829)
- probable – Robert Fagan, Irish painter, diplomat and archaeologist (died 1816)

== Deaths ==
- April 4 – Theodore Gardelle, painter and enameller (born 1722) (executed for murder)
- April 30 – Jean Duvivier, French medallist (born 1687)
- July 13 – Claes Lang, Finnish painter (born 1690)
- July 16 – Jacob Fortling, German-Danish sculptor, architect and manufacturer (born 1711)
- July 21 – Louis Galloche, French painter (born 1670)
- August 18 – François Gaspard Adam, French rococo sculptor (born 1710)
- September 7 – Johann Wolfgang Baumgartner, German painter (born 1702)
- December 10 – Johann Georg Platzer, Austrian painter of primarily historical and mythical scenes (born 1704)
- date unknown
  - August Querfurt, Austrian painter (born 1696)
  - Mary Roberts, miniaturist
  - Pieter Tanjé, engraver from the Northern Netherlands (born 1706)
  - Ivan Vishnyakov, Russian painter (born 1699)
