= Kew Gardens: The Pagoda and Bridge =

Painting by Richard Wilson

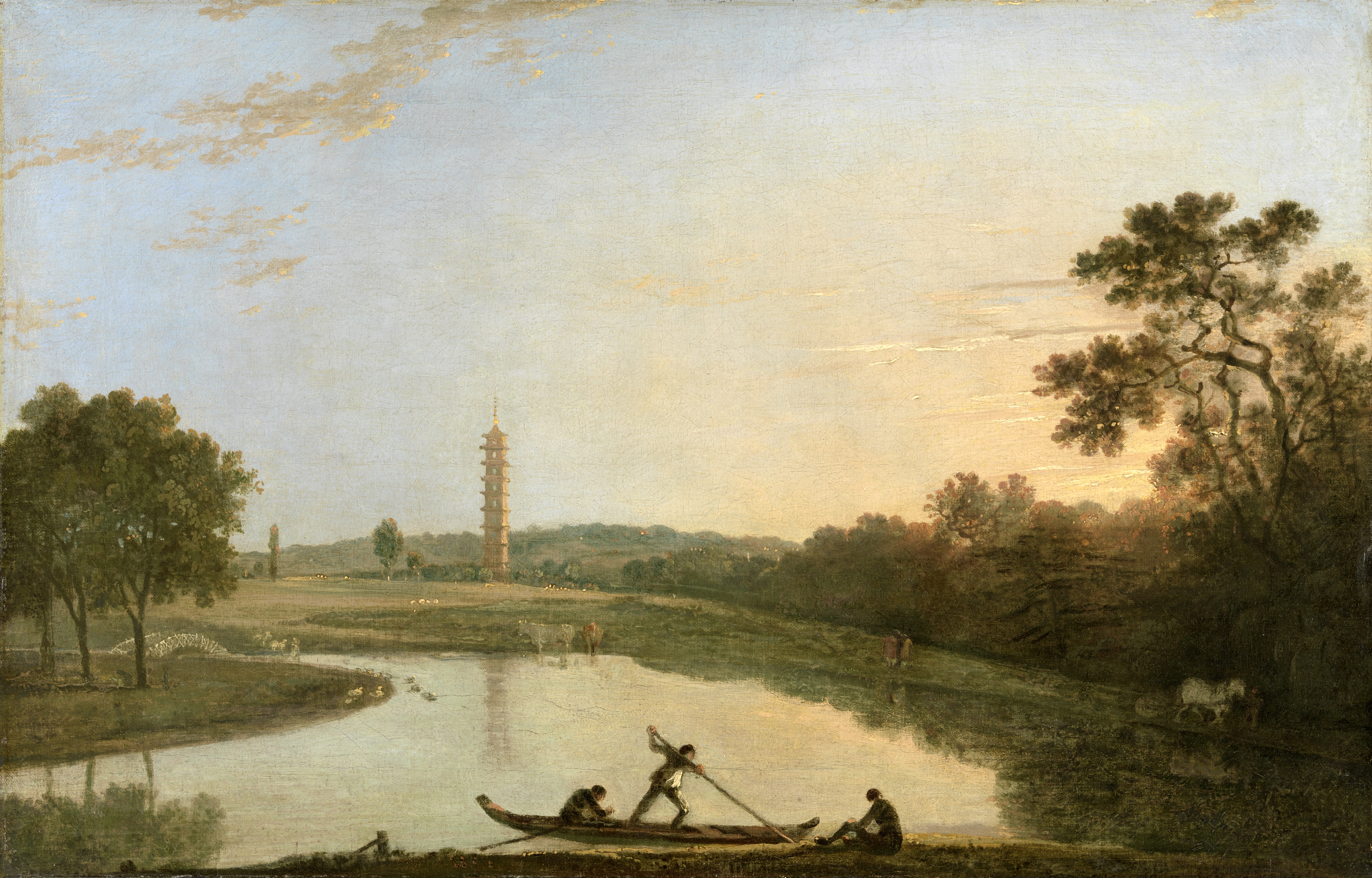
- Artist: Richard Wilson
- Year: 1762
- Type: Oil on canvas, landscape painting
- Dimensions: 47.6 cm × 73.0 cm (18.74 in × 28.74 in)
- Location: Yale Center for British Art, Yale University, New Haven

Kew Gardens: The Pagoda and Bridge is a 1762 landscape painting by the Welsh artist Richard Wilson. It depicts a view of Kew Gardens, then the grounds of the royal palace. It shows the newly constructed Great Pagoda, designed by the architect William Chambers. Both this and another work depicting Kew The Ruined Arch reflect Wilson's travels in Italy, and attempt to Italianise the scene. Chambers hoped these paintings would help his friend Wilson gain attention from the young George III, but the latter preferred more factually topographical depictions rather than Wilson's more impressionistic style.

It was entered into the Exhibition of 1762 staged by the Society of Artists of Great Britain in Spring Gardens, alongside The Ruined Arch. Today the painting is in the Yale Center for British Art in Connecticut, having been acquired from Paul Mellon in 1976.

== Bibliography ==
- Bury, Adrian. Richard Wilson, R.A.: The Grand Classic. F. Lewis, 1947.
- Harris, John. Sir William Chambers: Architect to George III. Yale University Press, 1996.
- Plumb, John Harold, Nygren, Edward J. Pressly, Nancy L. The Pursuit of Happiness: A View of Life in Georgian England. Yale Center for British Art, 1977.
