= Exhibition of 1762 =

1762 art exhibition in London

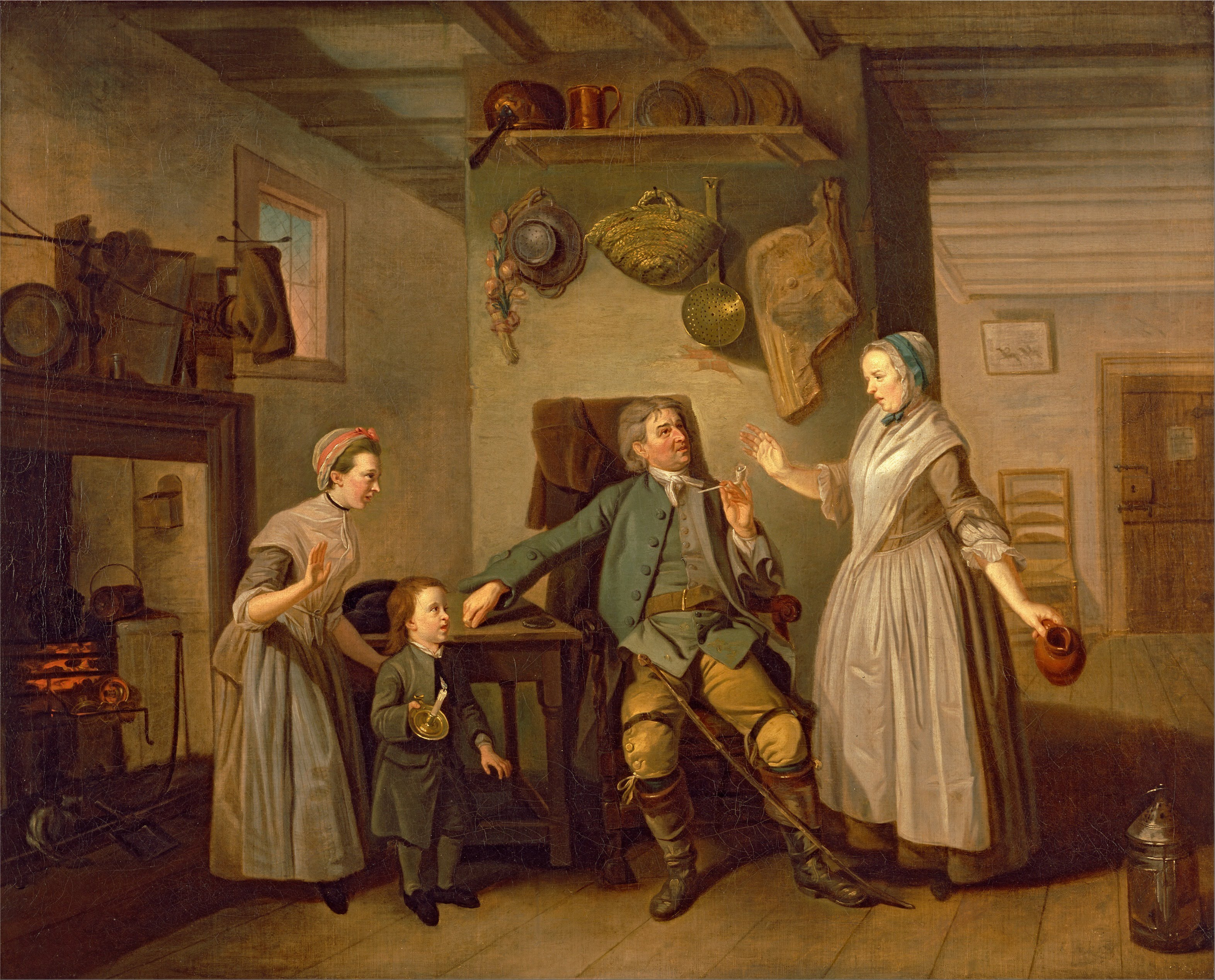
The Farmer's Return from London by Johan Zoffany

The Exhibition of 1762 was the second art exhibition staged by the Society of Artists of Great Britain. Held at the Society's headquarters at Spring Gardens in London, it featured displays from leading figures in sculpture, painting, architecture and printmaking. It opened on 17 May 1762. It attracted over ten thousand attendees.

It featured submissions from numerous prominent British-based painters, many of whom had been founders members the previous year when the organisation broke away and staged the Exhibition of 1761. It was held while Britain was involved in the Seven Years War against France and Spain. A mocking parody the Exhibition of British Sign Painters was a held at Bow Street in Covent Garden, which featured pub signs alongside satirical works. Nonetheless the exhibition was considered a success. It was followed by the Exhibition of 1763 at the same location.

== Exhibition ==
The veteran artist William Hogarth, smarting from the critical mauling of his Sigismunda Mourning Over the Heart of Guiscardo at the previous year's exhibition, didn't submit any works and was increasingly more sympathetic to the satirical attacks on the exhibition than with the Society he had co-founded. Francis Hayman designed the frontispiece for the exhibition catalogue which Hogarth had done the previous year.

Thomas Gainsborough exhibited a portrait of William Poyntz. George Stubbs submitted several works including The Fall of Phaeton and The Grosvenor Hunt. The landscape artist Richard Wilson displayed two views of Kew Gardens The Pagoda and Bridge and The Ruined Arch. Joshua Reynolds exhibited four paintings. His portrait of Lady Keppel, recently a bridesmaid of Queen Charlotte, is one of his most admired full-length pictures. Most notable amongst the others was his David Garrick Between Tragedy and Comedy. The German painter Johan Zoffany displayed his own work featuring David Garrick, The Farmer's Return from London a depiction of him starring in a popular theatrical work of the period.

== Gallery ==
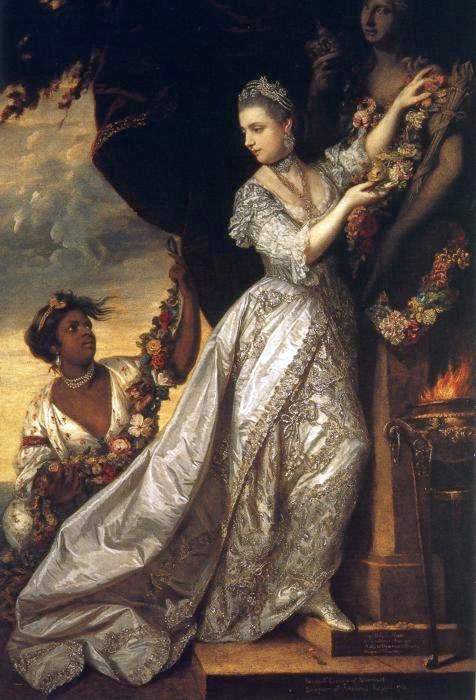
Portrait of Lady Keppel by Joshua Reynolds

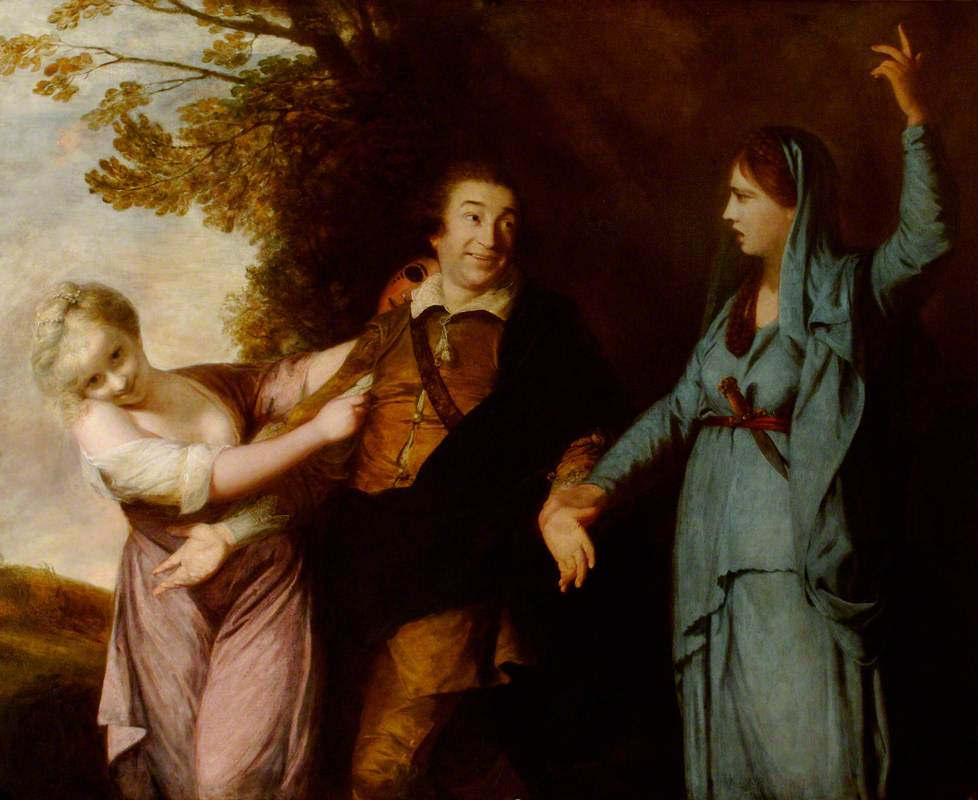
David Garrick Between Tragedy and Comedy by Joshua Reynolds

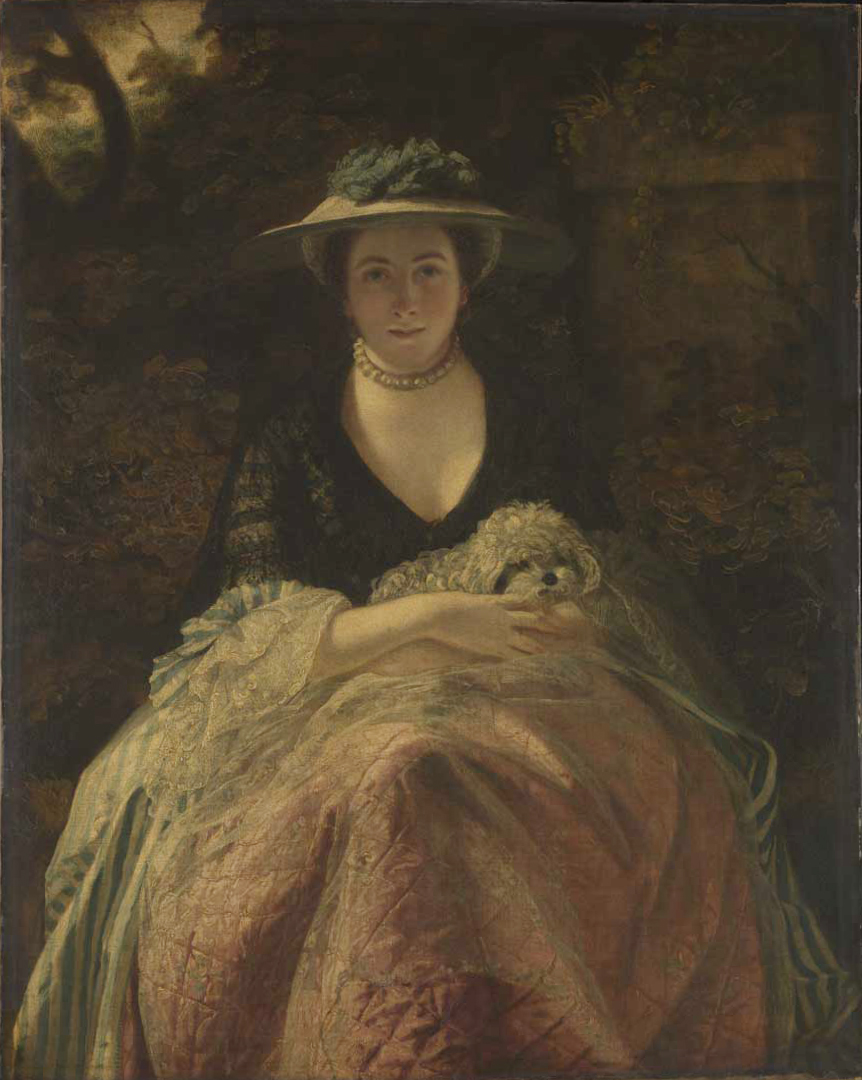
Portrait of Nelly O'Brien by Joshua Reynolds. Reynolds produced several portraits of O'Brien, this was possibly the one he exhibited in 1762

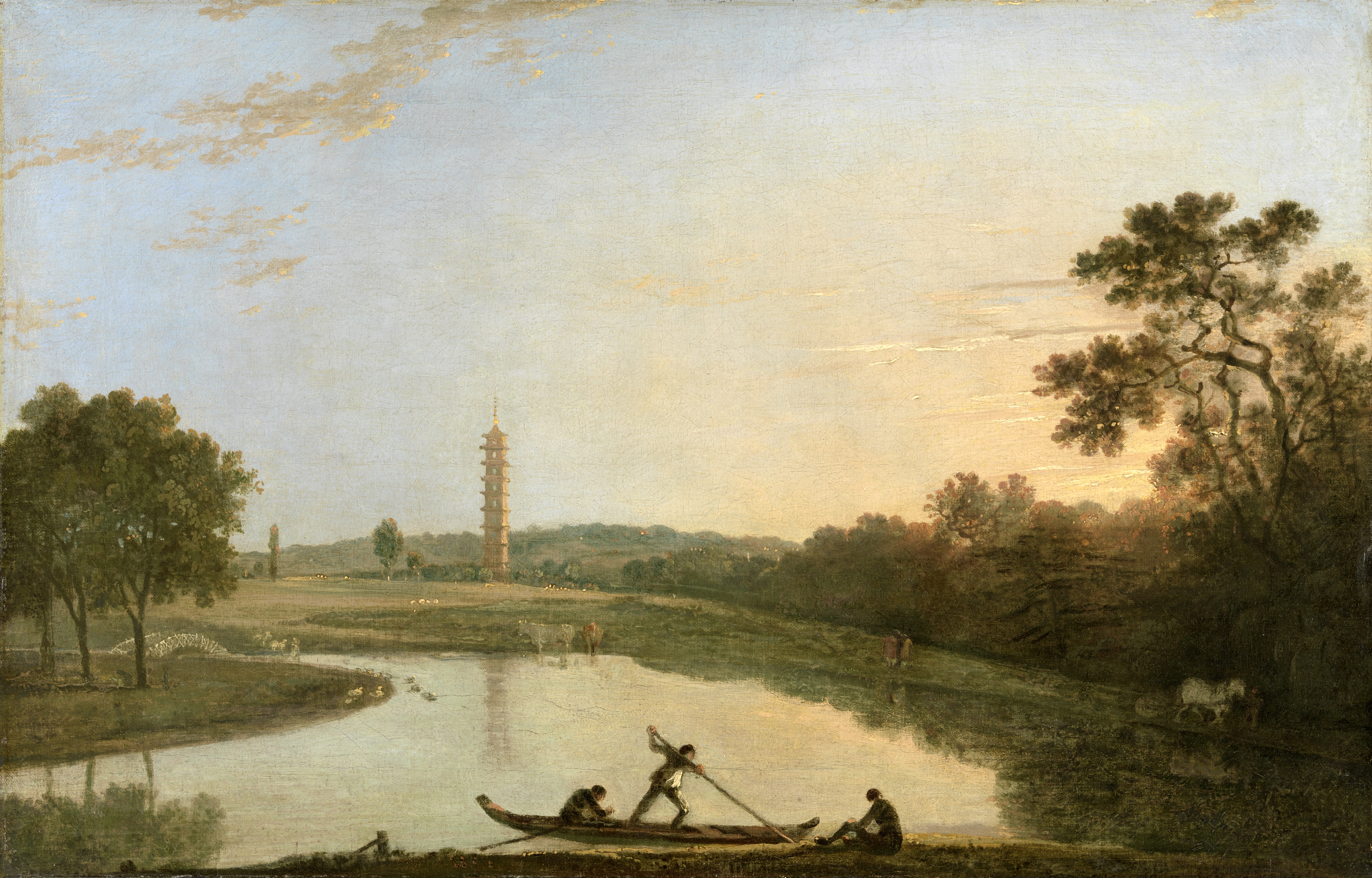
Kew Gardens: The Pagoda and Bridge by Richard Wilson

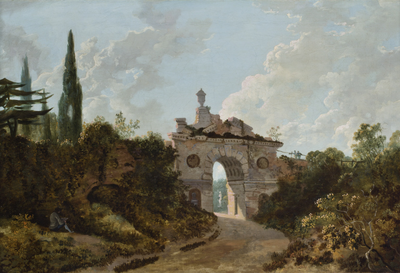
The Ruined Arch by Richard Wilson

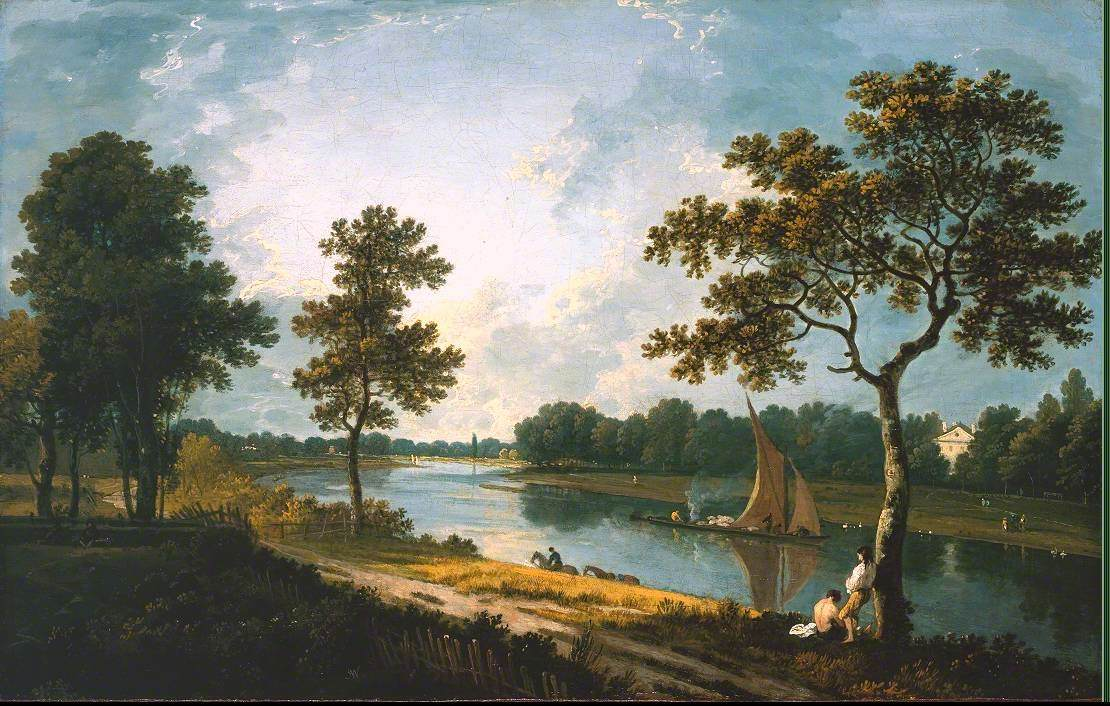
The Thames near Marble Hill, Twickenham by Richard Wilson

== Bibliography ==
- Eger, Elizabeth. Women, Writing and the Public Sphere, 1700-1830. Cambridge University Press, 2001.
- Egerton, Judy. George Stubbs, Painter. Yale University Press, 2007.
- Fordham, Douglas. British Art and the Seven Years' War: Allegiance and Autonomy. University of Pennsylvania Press, 2010.
- Fullager, Kate. The Warrior, the Voyager, and the Artist: Three Lives in an Age of Empire. Yale University Press, 2020.
- Hamilton, James. Gainsborough: A Portrait. Hachette UK, 2017.
- Hargreaves, Matthew. Candidates for Fame: The Society of Artists of Great Britain, 1760-1791. Paul Mellon Centre for Studies in British Art, 2005.
- Hoock, Holger. Empires of the Imagination: Politics, War, and the Arts in the British World, 1750–1850. Profile Books, 2010.
- McIntyre, Ian. Joshua Reynolds: The Life and Times of the First President of the Royal Academy. Allen Lane, 2003.
- Milam, Jennifer D. Historical Dictionary of Rococo Art. Scarecrow Press, 2011.
- Uglow, Jenny. William Hogarth: A Life and a World. Faber & Faber, 2011.
