= Portrait of Robert Orme =

1756 painting by Joshua Reynolds

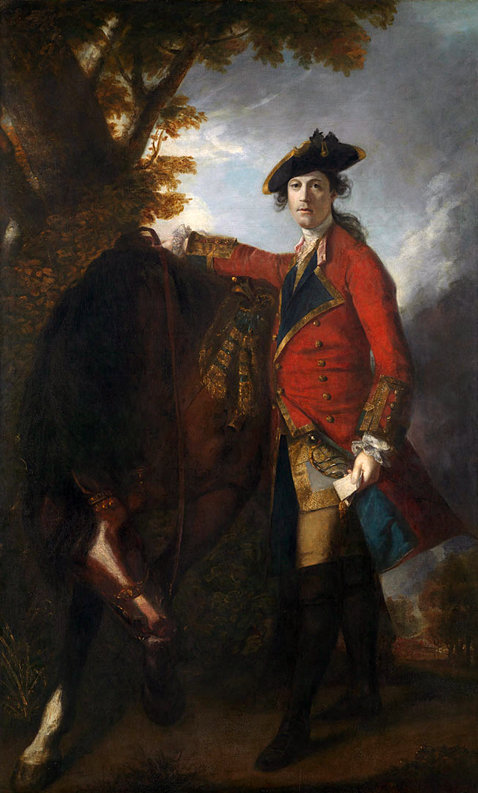
Joshua Reynolds, Robert Orme, 1756. Oil on canvas. National Gallery, London.

Portrait of Robert Orme is a portrait of British Army officer Robert Orme, painted in 1756 by the British painter Joshua Reynolds, the year after Orme returned from North America. The artist shows him in the uniform of the Coldstream Regiment of Foot Guards, standing by his horse in a darkened corner of a forest. Behind is a stormy sky and visible through the trees are the red jackets of the British, referring to Orme's part in the British defeat at Monongahela. According to the National Gallery, the composition of the painting was based on a sketch of Saint Francis embracing a Sick Man completed by Jacopo Ligozzi in 1752.

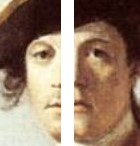
Split view of Orme's face

Reynolds's division of Orme's face into light and dark halves has been noted by critics for its insight into the effect on Orme of the battle and the loss of comrades. Mark Hallett describes the light half as showing a "resolute and reassuring English army officer", while he sees the dark half as showing a man who only minutes before had seen his comrades "cut to pieces", as it was put in contemporary newspapers.

Douglas Fordham agrees and describes the painting as an innovative work that updates the established genre of the full-length portrait, which was typically of an aristocrat born to his position, to include a display of the sensibility expected of a gentleman in the 18th century, and to show a man who had achieved his position through his own talents, like Joshua Reynolds who also was not from an aristocratic background. In that respect, Fordham argues, Orme was symbolic of a changing England where merit was beginning to matter more than connections, both in soldiering and in painting.

Hallett places the picture in the genre of portraits of martial celebrities that developed in England in the eighteenth century against a background of the Seven Years' War (1755–1764) and other conflicts during the century, and which was one of the genres in which Reynolds specialised. He also describes the Orme portrait as exemplifying Reynolds's desire to go beyond simple likeness in order to comment more generally on developments in British society, in this case British military ambitions and the anxieties provoked by war.

It was displayed at the Exhibition of 1761 at Spring Gardens, the inaugural exhibition of the Society of Artists of Great Britain of which Reynolds was a founder member..The painting may have been made speculatively without a buyer in mind as Reynolds did not sell it until 1777 when it was acquired by the 5th Earl of Inchquin. It passed by descent to the 5th Earl of Orkney before it was bought by Sir Charles Eastlake at Christie's in 1862 or 1863 for the National Gallery.
