= Sigismunda Mourning over the Heart of Guiscardo =

Painting by William Hogarth

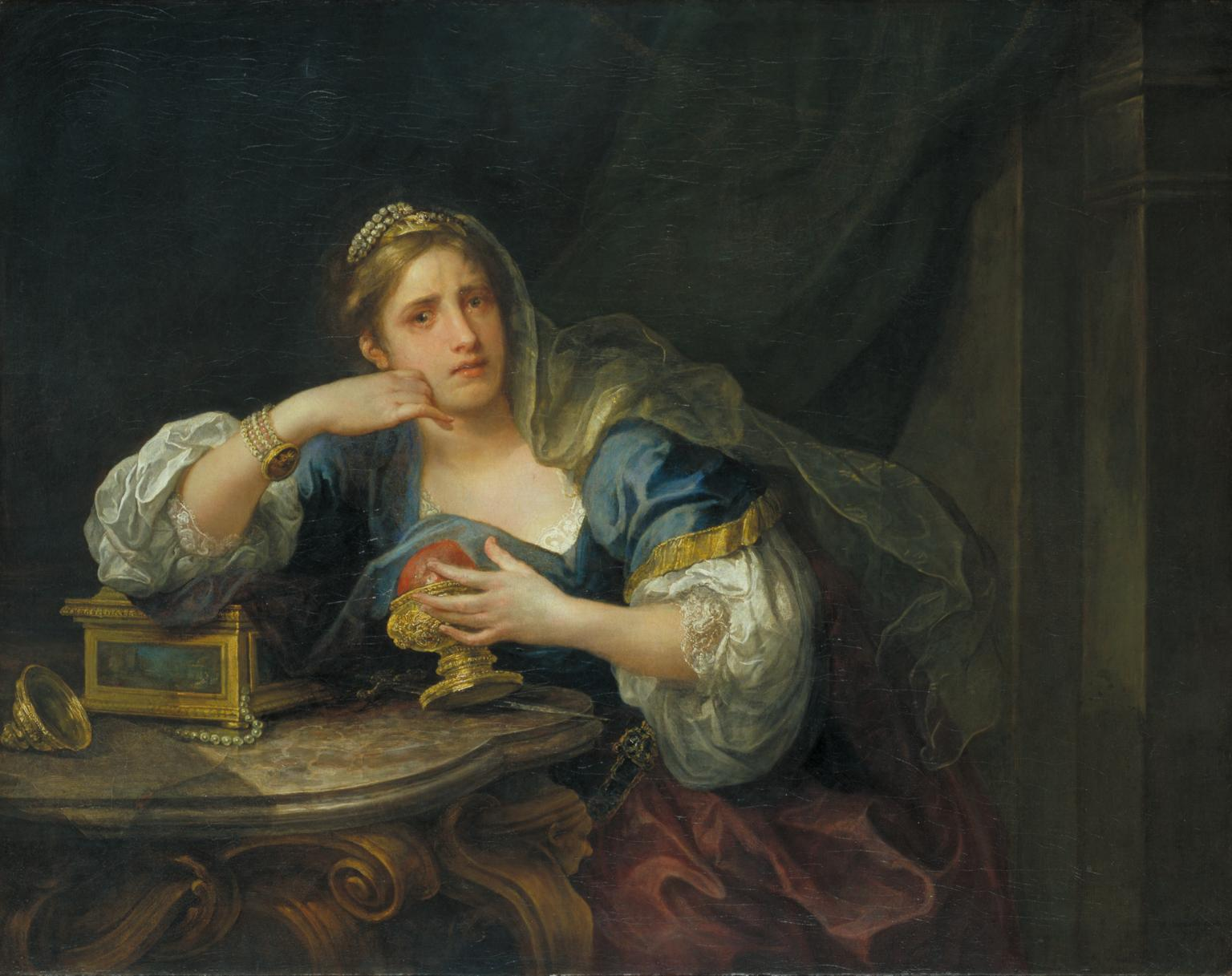
- Artist: William Hogarth
- Year: 1759
- Medium: Oil-on-canvas
- Dimensions: 100.4 cm × 126.5 cm (39.5 in × 49.8 in)
- Location: Tate Gallery, London

Sigismunda Mourning over the Heart of Guiscardo, fully titled Sigismunda mourning over the Heart of Guiscardo, her murder'd Husband, is an oil painting by British artist William Hogarth. Finished in 1759, it was the principal piece of the eight works he displayed at the Exhibition of 1761 at Spring Gardens. It was the final and most ambitious of his attempts to secure for himself a reputation as a history painter. It depicts a dramatic moment in one of the novelle in Boccaccio's Decameron. While Hogarth had expected this work to be acclaimed as a masterpiece of dramatic painting, the work was met with criticism and ridicule. In the catalogue of the exhibition of Hogarth's works at the Tate Gallery in 2007, the criticism was described as "some of the most damning critical opprobrium the artist ever suffered".

== Analysis ==
The current painting illustrates a scene from the first tale on Day 4 of The Decameron, a medieval collection of short stories (novelle) by Italian author and poet, Giovanni Boccaccio.

Seated at an ornate wooden table, wearing a pearl tiara and flowing silk, is Sigismunda (called Ghismonda in Boccaccio's original tale), the heroine of one of the novelle. It is probable that Hogarth modelled her on his wife, Jane. She clasps a golden goblet containing the heart of her murdered husband, Guiscardo.

Guiscardo was a servant and page in the court of Sigismunda's father, Prince Tancred of Salerno. When Sigismunda's father discovered that Guiscardo and Sigismunda had wed secretly, he angrily ordered his men to murder the low-born Guiscardo, and had Guiscardo's heart delivered to Sigismunda in a golden cup. Despite having committed to die without shedding a tear, she weeps as she realises her father has murdered her husband. She adds poison to the cup containing Guiscardo's heart, and commits suicide by drinking it.

Hogarth claimed to have long been interested in the story of Sigismunda, which had appeared in England in several versions by the mid-18th century. It had become popular after being translated in John Dryden's 1699 volume of Fables, Ancient and Modern, and adapted for the English stage by James Thomson in 1745.

== Commission ==
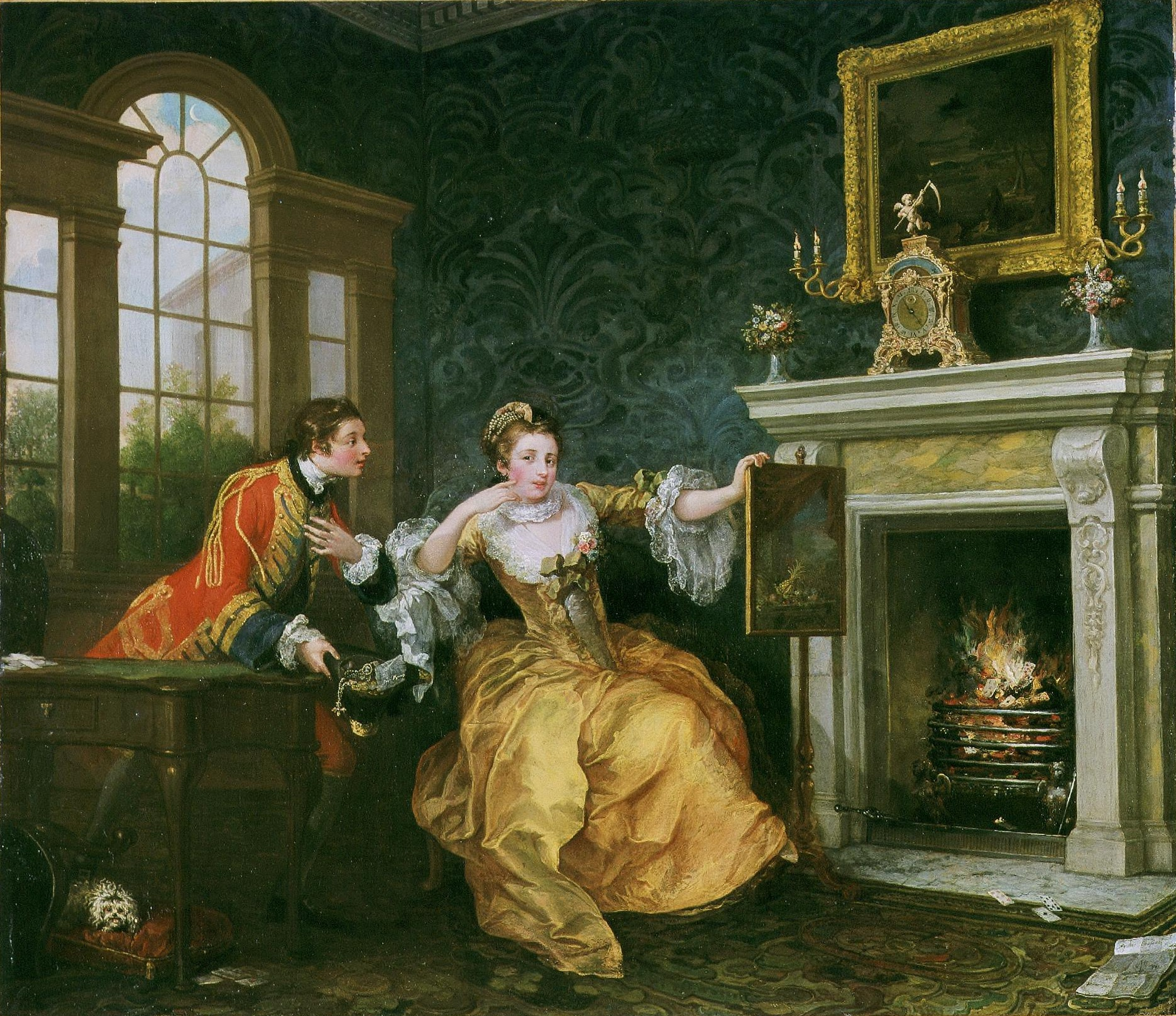
The Lady's Last Stake (c. 1759), Albright-Knox Art Gallery, Buffalo, New York

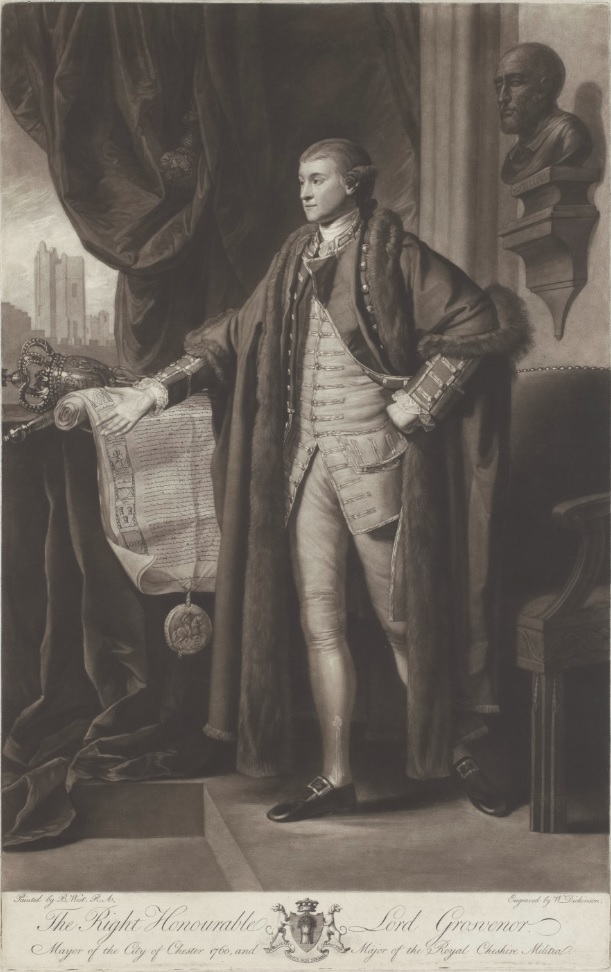
Richard Grosvenor, 1st Earl Grosvenor, who commissioned the painting in 1758

The painting was one of Hogarth's last works, commissioned in 1758 by Sir Richard Grosvenor. James Caulfeild, 1st Earl of Charlemont had previously commissioned a painting from Hogarth, allowing Hogarth to select the subject and price.

For Lord Charlemont, Hogarth chose to paint the satirical Piquet, or Virtue in Danger (also known as The Lady's Last Stake, after a 1708 play by Colley Cibber), which, with echoes of Marriage à-la-Mode, shows an army officer offering an aristocratic lady a chance to recover the fortune she has just lost by gambling (with the implication that if she loses again, she will have to take him as her lover). After Grosvenor saw this painting in Hogarth's studio in 1758, he asked Hogarth to paint a picture for him as well, under the same terms.

Hogarth chose a more serious topic for Grosvenor's painting. He is said to have painted Sigismunda mourning over the Heart of Guiscardo with the aim of proving that he could equal works of the "Old Italian Masters", and intending the painting to be one of his masterpieces. In the leg of the table in the painting, a turbaned, pug-nosed figure is carved, emerging from the ornate decoration, which is reminiscent of Hogarth's self-portrait The Artist Painting the Comic Muse from around 1757, and is perhaps Hogarth's attempt to insert himself bodily into the picture, thereby making an overt connection between himself and the Old Masters. In 1758, Sir Thomas Sebright, 5th Baronet had paid £405.5s in an Old Master auction for a painting of Sigismunda supposedly by Correggio. Hogarth doubted the attribution and was later proved correct: the painting is now considered to be by Francesco Furini. Nevertheless, Hogarth priced his Sigismunda in line with what was paid for the "Correggio" version and commensurate with the time he had spent creating it – at least two hundred days (although it appears he was also working on finishing Piquet during this period) – and this may have contributed to Grosvenor's eventual loss of interest. When Hogarth presented the piece to Grosvenor, he rejected it, ostensibly because it was "so striking and inimitable, that the constantly having it before one's eyes would be too often occasioning melancholy ideas to arise in one's mind"; in disgust, Hogarth released him from their bargain.

== Reception ==
Hogarth exhibited the painting at the Society of Artists in Spring Gardens in 1761. Although press reports – perhaps placed by Hogarth and his supporters – were enthusiastic, Sigismunda mourning over the Heart of Guiscardo was attacked by critics who marked Hogarth's attempt to emulate the drama depicted in older Italian paintings as foolhardy and ridiculous. Many critics were repulsed by the shocking contrast between the melancholy beauty of Sigismunda and the grotesquely bloody organ that she delicately touched. It was said that Hogarth placed an attendant next to the painting to note the remarks made by the viewers; changes to the painting suggest that he may have responded to these criticisms by altering his work, although it is impossible to ascertain whether many of the changes were made before or after the painting was exhibited.

One of the fiercest critics of Hogarth's work was the critic and writer Horace Walpole. Walpole, who had admired the "Correggio", compared Hogarth's portrayal of Sigismunda to that of a "maudlin fallen virago", and saw in it:

None of the somber grief, no dignity of suppressed anguish, no involuntary tear, no settled meditation on the fate she meant to meet, no amorous warmth turned holy by despair

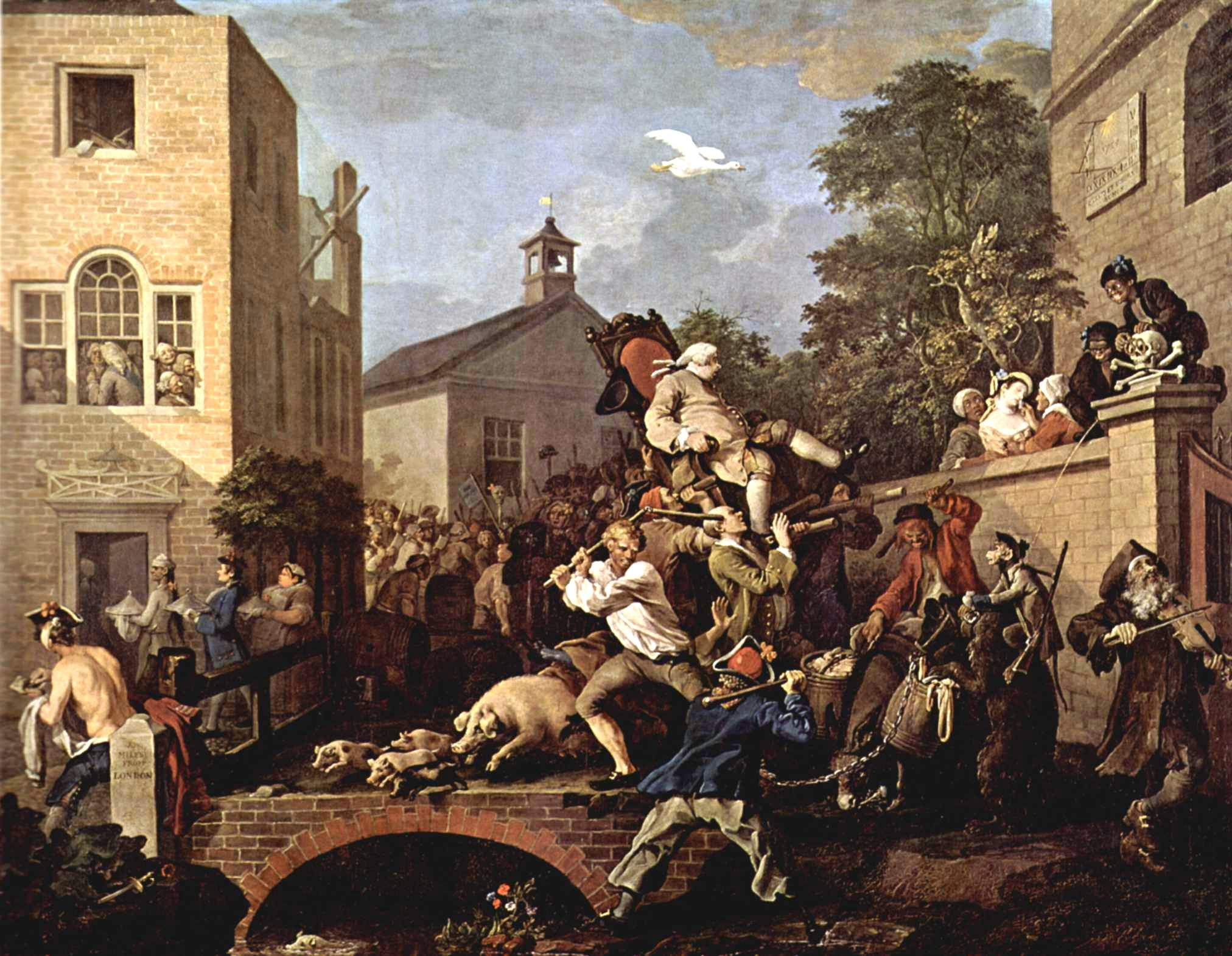
Chairing the Member replaced Sigismunda after only ten days

John Wilkes dismissed it as "not human". More predictably, in his Epistle to William Hogarth, Charles Churchill sympathised with Sigismunda as the "helpless victim of a dauber's hand".

After ten days of the exhibition, Hogarth replaced the painting with another of his canvases, Chairing the Member, the fourth and last piece in his Humours of an Election series.

Hogarth was unable to sell the painting, but he considered selling engravings based on it. A subscription ticket for the engraving of Sigismunda depicting Time Smoking a Picture was made, and some subscriptions were sold before being recalled, but by March 1761 Hogarth had abandoned the project, having failed to find an engraver to produce the plates. Hogarth instructed his widow not to sell the canvas for less than £500. On Jane Hogarth's death in 1789, the painting passed to her cousin, Mary Lewis. She sold it by auction at Greenwood's in 1790 for 56 guineas to the publisher John Boydell, who exhibited it in his Shakespeare Gallery. Benjamin Smith made an engraving which was published in 1795. The painting was sold for 400 guineas at Christie's in 1807, and had been acquired by J. H. Anderdon by 1814. He bequeathed it to the Tate Gallery in 1879.

== Alterations ==
A number of alterations are visible to the naked eye as pentimenti. A piece of paper draped over the edge of the table is clearly visible in outline, despite having been painted over with detailing of the table itself. Sigismunda's index finger which was bent towards and perhaps touching the heart has been straightened, but the outline of the tip is still visible on the surface of the heart. A looped cord in the top right-hand corner is poorly concealed under the topmost layer of paint. It is also known that, to attempt to appease critics, Hogarth repainted the fingers of Sigismunda so that the blood that was previously there would no longer be visible.

== See also ==
- List of works by William Hogarth
