= Exhibition of 1761 =

1761 art exhibition in London

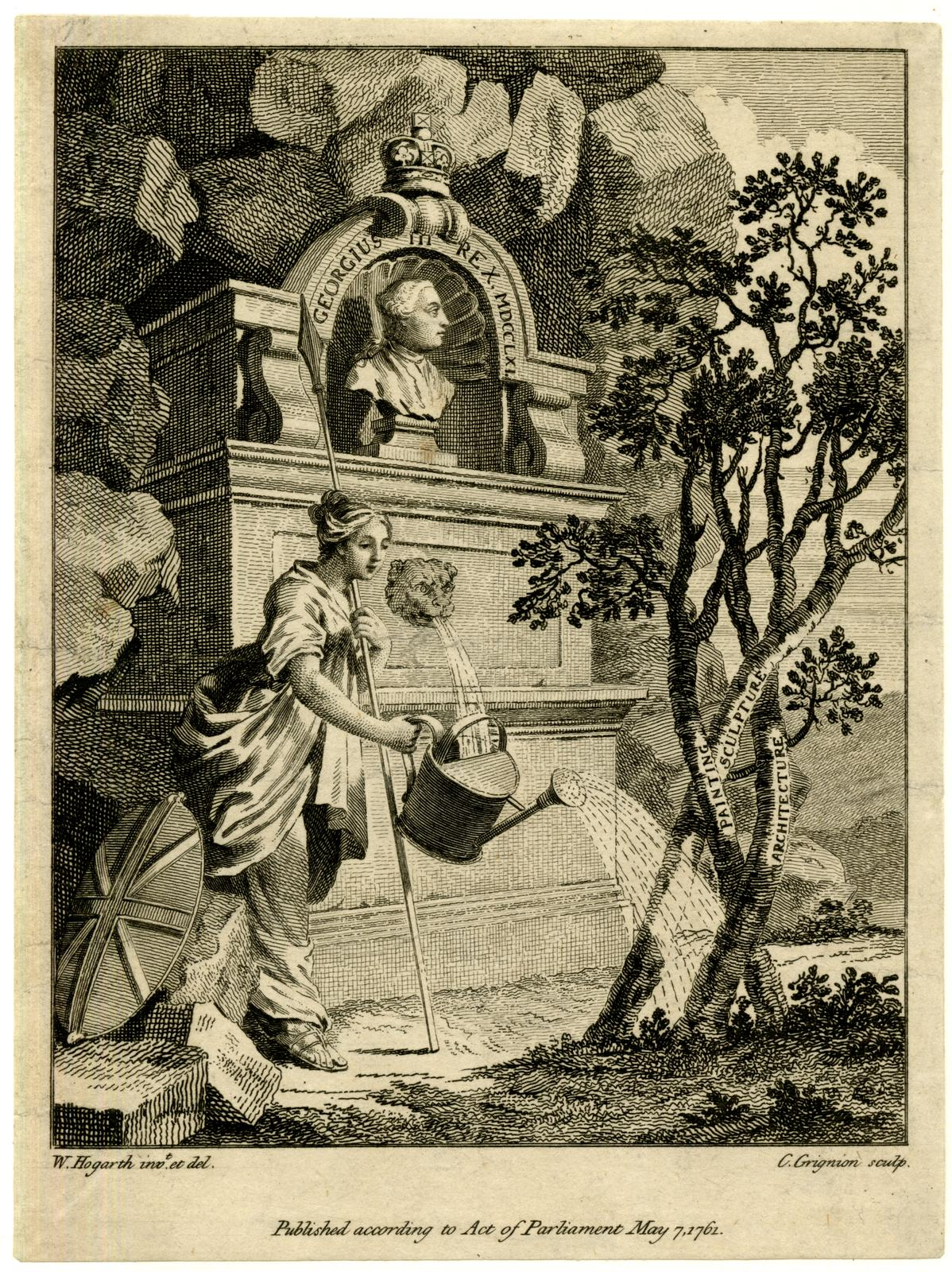
Frontispiece of the Exhibition catalogue, designed by William Hogarth

The Exhibition of 1761 was the inaugural art exhibition staged by the Society of Artists of Great Britain (SAGB), a group of painters, architects and sculptors. The exhibition opened on 9 May 1761 and was held at Spring Gardens in Westminster, London.

== Background ==
The previous year the First Exhibition of contemporary art was staged in London. Organised by the Society for the Encouragement of Arts, Manufactures and Commerce, it had been regarded as a success. However, there were objections to the management by William Shipley. Disputes amongst the participants saw the artists split into two factions. A large body of leading artists left to form their own organisation, the Society of Artists of Great Britain (with Shipley's supporters forming the separate Free Society of Artists).

Two prominent members of the Society of Artists, the painter Joshua Reynolds and architect James Paine, sought out a new exhibition space, which they found at Spring Gardens close to the Strand. To suggest continuity with the previous year, it was referred to as the Second Exhibition. The rival Free Society of Artists also held their own exhibition.

== Exhibition ==
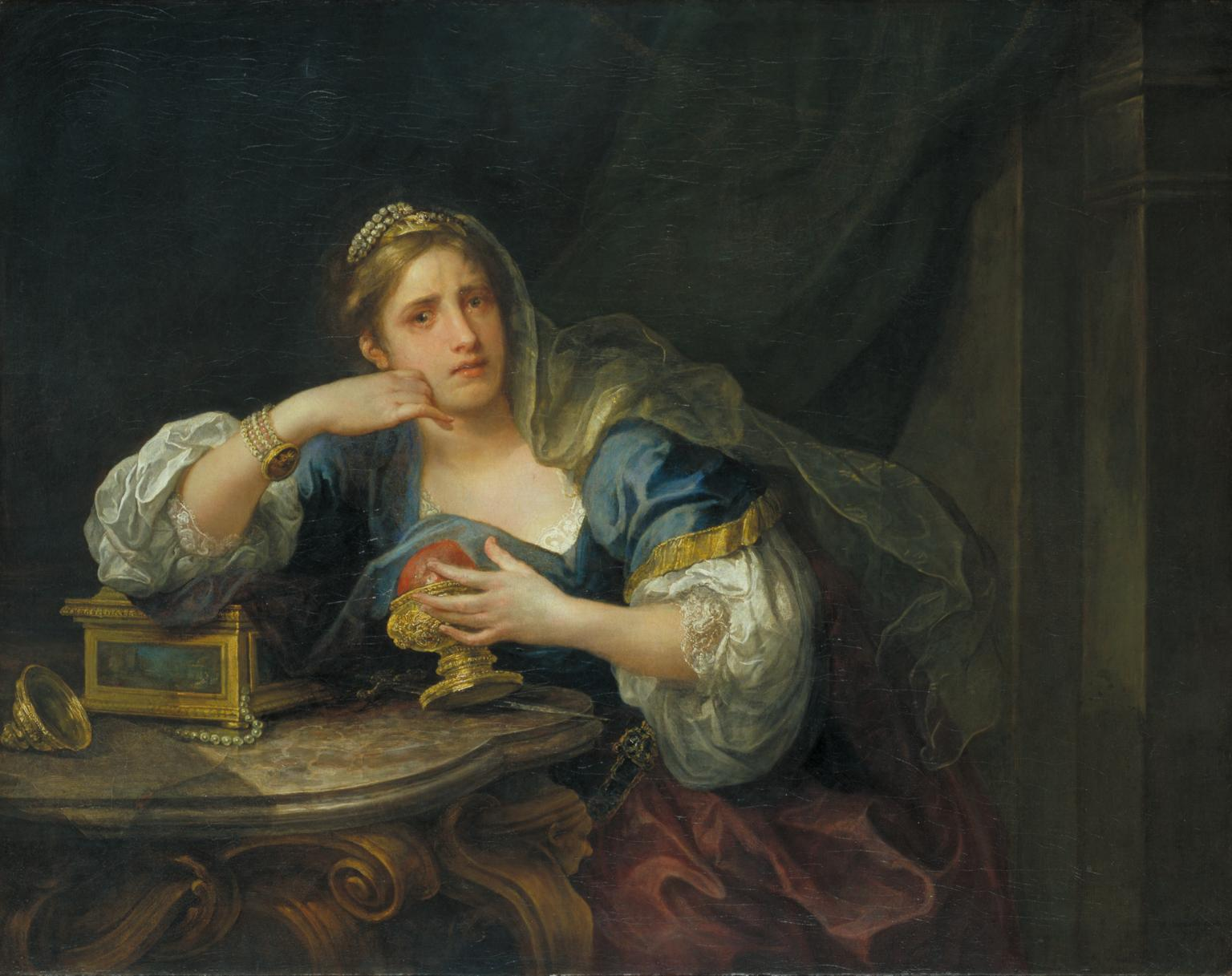
Sigismunda Mourning over the Heart of Guiscardo by William Hogarth

The exhibition featured works from leading British painters including William Hogarth, Francis Hayman, Richard Wilson, Thomas Gainsborough, Joshua Reynolds and the sculptor Joseph Nollekens. Catherine Read was a notable female exhibitor.

Alongside a portrait of the Irish writer Laurence Sterne, Reynolds displayed his Portrait of Robert Orme, a military-themed painting he had produced several years earlier. He also submitted a full-length equestrian portrait of Lord Ligonier, for which he may have received assistance from George Stubbs. Stubbs also submitted a painting A Stallion Called Romulus. Hogarth exhibited eight works; notable amongst them was Sigismunda Mourning over the Heart of Guiscardo, based on Boccaccio's Decameron. Although he had high hopes for the work, it received widespread ridicule. By 20 May he had withdrawn the painting and replaced it with Chairing the Member.

Gainsborough, then based in Bath and establishing himself as a fashionable portrait artist, sent a painting of the Irish politician Lord Nugent. Andrea Casali exhibited a now-lost history painting featuring King Edgar and Alfrida.

The Exhibition took place during the Seven Years' War and the Society attempted to associate itself with patriotic themes. For the one shilling exhibition catalogue Hogarth designed a frontispiece featuring the young George III and Britannia, with a preface by Samuel Johnson. Later, during the Coronation of George III in September 1761, the Society illuminated the building in Spring Gardens with images associating the new monarch with Britain's naval victories and artistic success.

== Aftermath ==
The following year the SAGB held a second successful exhibition, again at Spring Gardens. The SAGB then held exhibitions annually but suffered a major blow following the Exhibition of 1768 when leading members defected to found the Royal Academy. Supported by George III, the Royal Academy staged its first Summer Exhibition at Somerset House in 1769. SAGB exhibitions continued with decreasing frequency until the organisation was disbanded in 1791.

== Gallery ==
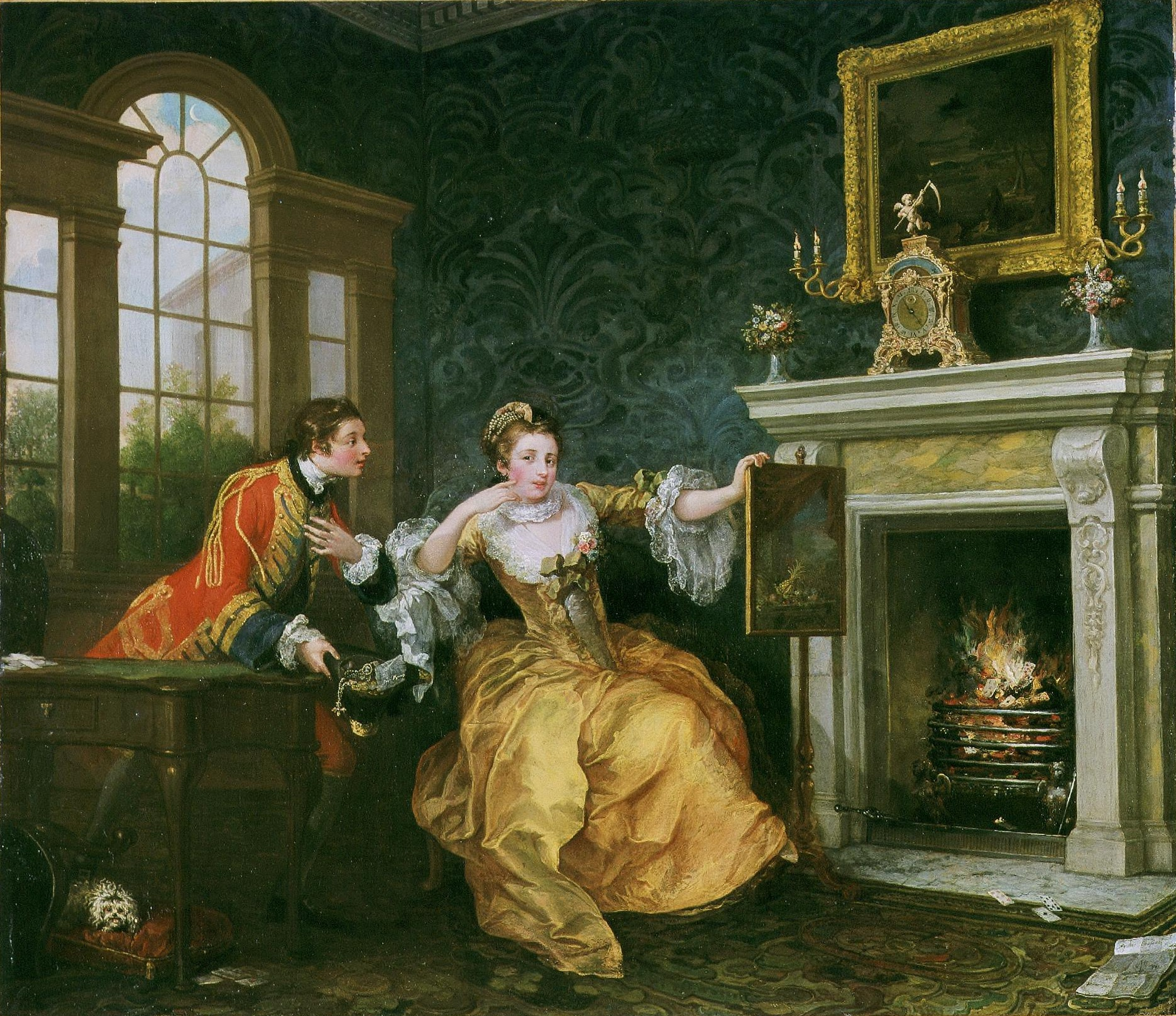
The Lady's Last Stake by William Hogarth

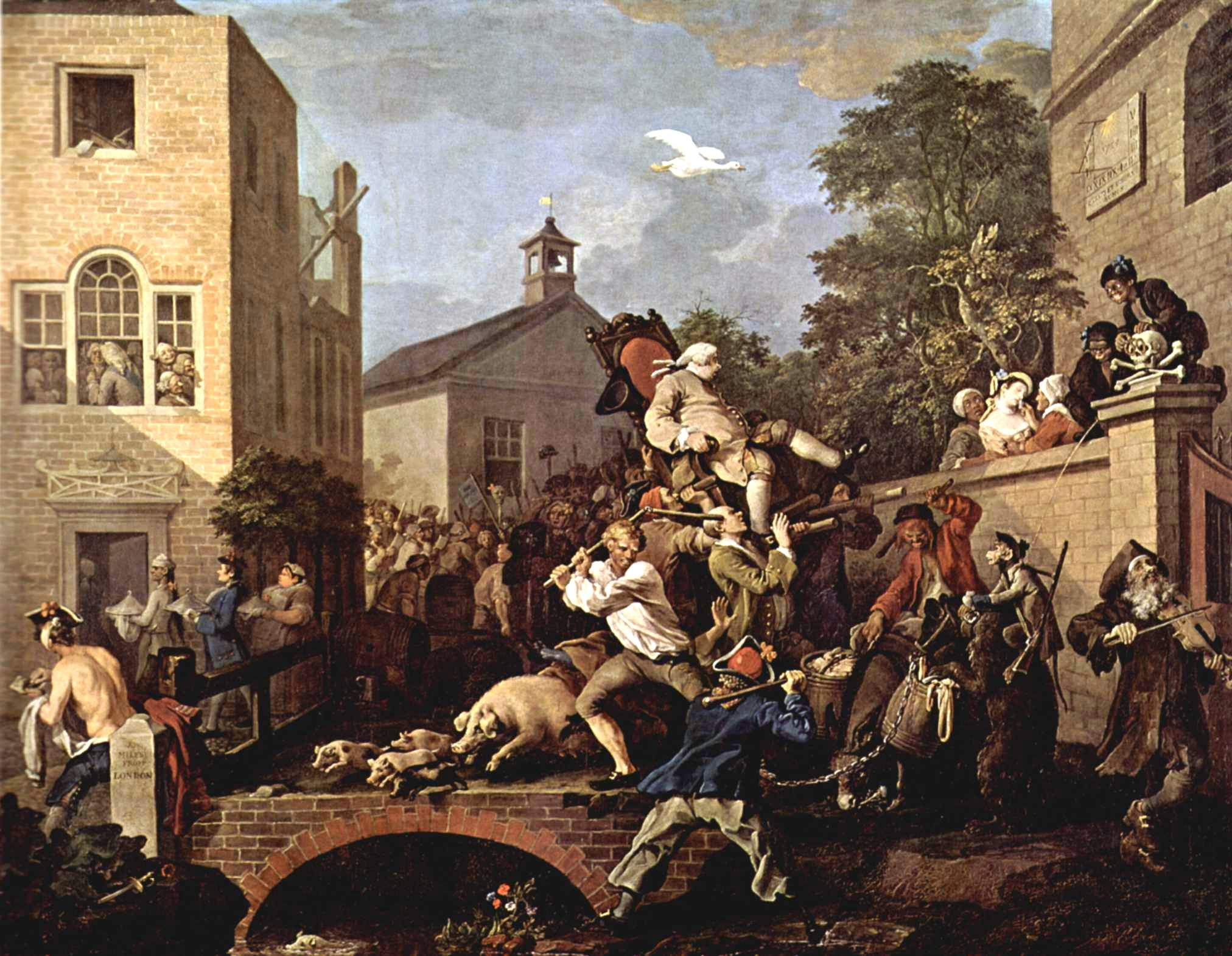
Chairing the Member by William Hogarth

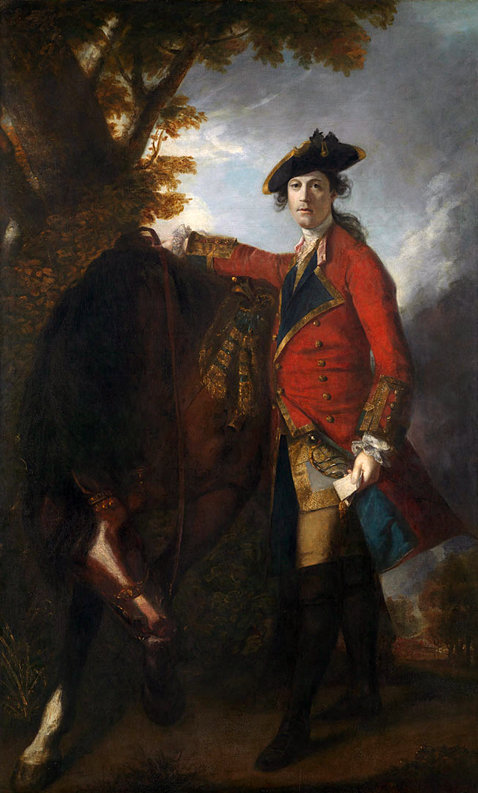
Portrait of Robert Orme by Joshua Reynolds

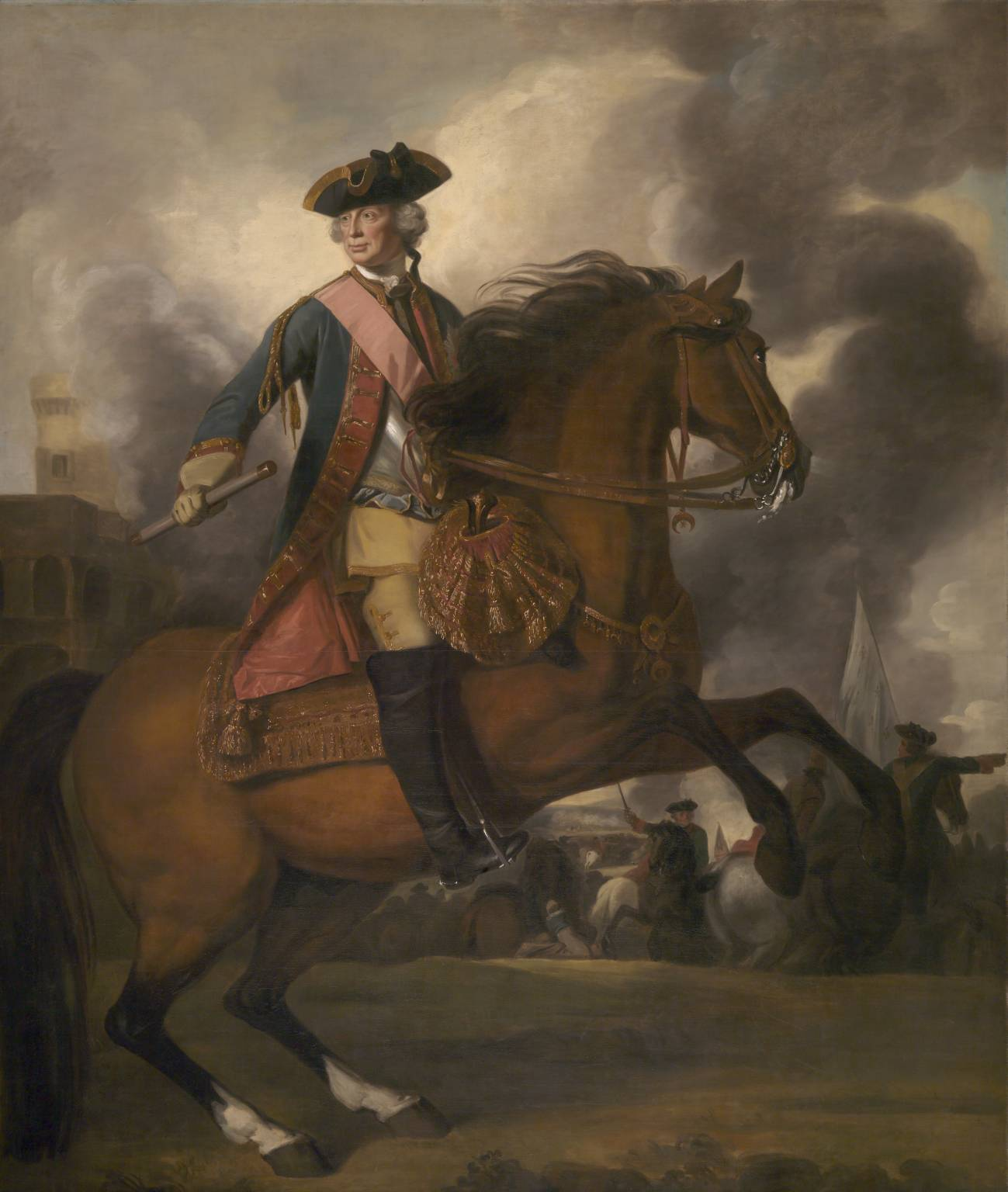
Lord Ligonier by Joshua Reynolds

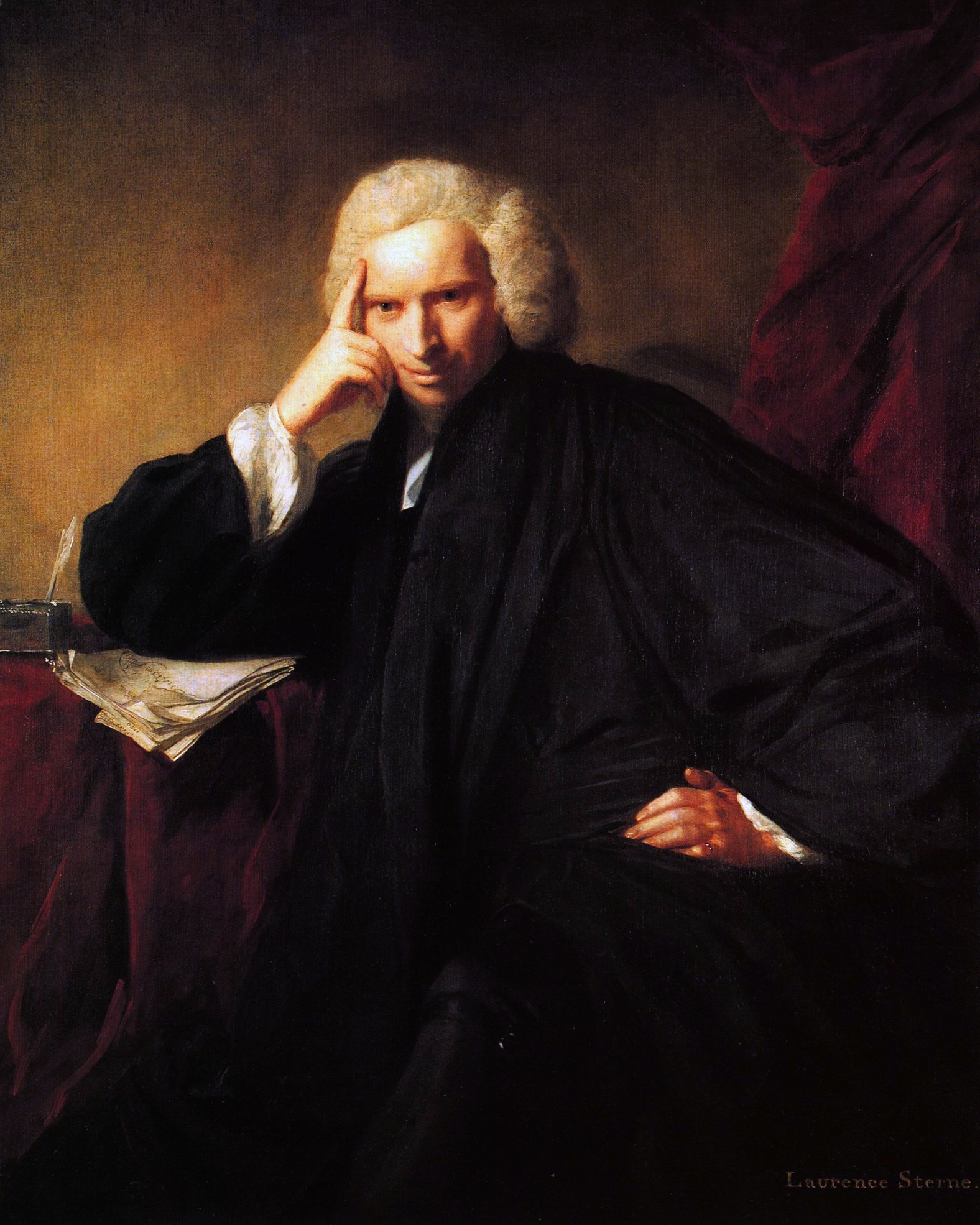
Portrait of Laurence Sterne by Joshua Reynolds

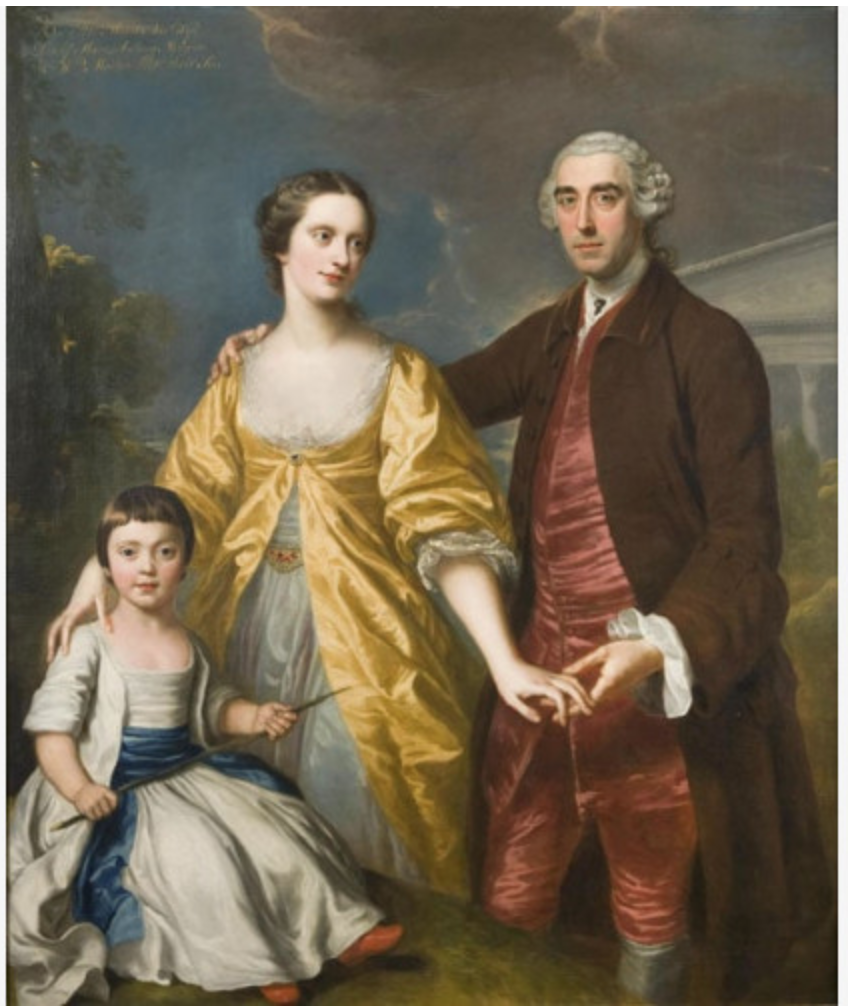
The Pitt Family of Encombe by William Hoare

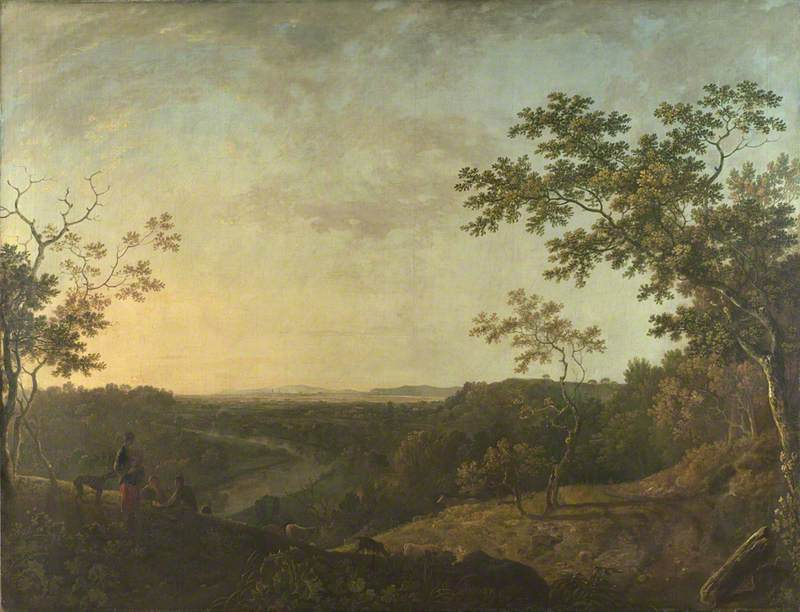
The Valley of the Dee, with Chester in the Distance by Richard Wilson

== See also ==
- Salon of 1761, a contemporaneous French exhibition held at the Louvre

== Bibliography ==
- Black, Jeremy. Culture in Eighteenth-Century England; A Subject for Taste. Bloomsbury Academic, 2005.
- Egerton, Judy. George Stubbs, Painter. Yale University Press, 2007.
- Fordham, Douglas. British Art and the Seven Years' War: Allegiance and Autonomy. University of Pennsylvania Press, 2010.
- Hamilton, James. Gainsborough: A Portrait. Hachette UK, 2017.
- Hargreaves, Matthew. Candidates for Fame: The Society of Artists of Great Britain, 1760-1791. Paul Mellon Centre for Studies in British Art, 2005.
- Haywood, Ian, Matthews, Susan & Shannon, Mary L. (ed.) Romanticism and Illustration. Cambridge University Press, 2019.
- Hoock, Holger. Empires of the Imagination: Politics, War, and the Arts in the British World, 1750–1850. Profile Books, 2010.
- Uglow, Jenny. William Hogarth: A Life and a World. Faber & Faber, 2011.
