= The Valley of the Dee, with Chester in the Distance =

Painting by Richard Wilson

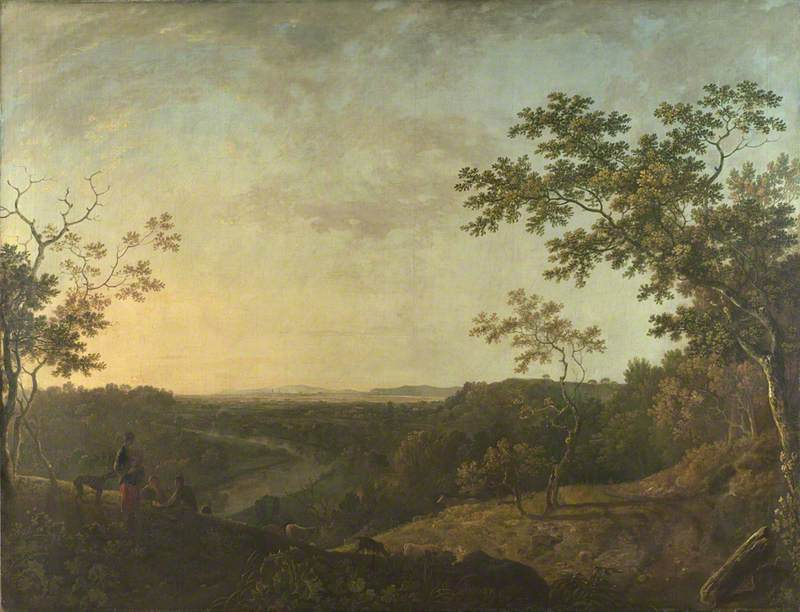
- Artist: Richard Wilson
- Year: 1761
- Type: Landscape painting
- Medium: Oil on canvas
- Dimensions: 148 cm × 193.5 cm (58 in × 76.2 in)
- Location: National Gallery, London

The Valley of the Dee, with Chester in the Distance is a landscape painting of 1761 by the Welsh artist Richard Wilson. It depicts the valley of the River Dee on the border of England and Wales, showing a view downstream from the village of Holt (then in the county of Denbighshire). In the distance is the city of Chester with the towers of Chester Cathedral and St John's Church just visible. The painting reflects Wilson's interest in the works of the seventeenth-century French artist Claude Lorrain.

The painting was displayed at the Exhibition of 1761 at the Society of Artists at Spring Gardens, London. Today it is in the collection of the National Gallery along with his companion piece Holt Bridge on the River Dee, having been acquired by the gallery in 1953.

== Bibliography ==
- Postle, Martin & Simon, Robin. Richard Wilson and the Transformation of European Landscape Painting. Yale Center for British Art, 2014.
- Solkin, David H. Richard Wilson: The Landscape of Reaction. Tate Gallery, 1982.
