= The Thames near Marble Hill, Twickenham =

Painting by Richard Wilson

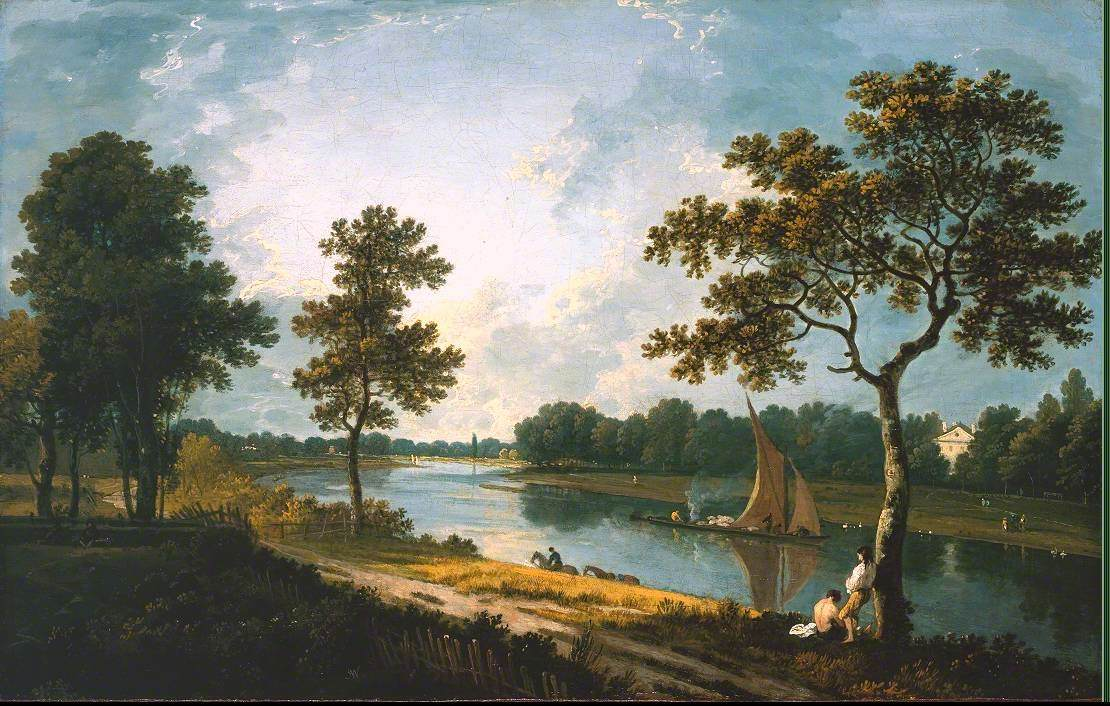
- Artist: Richard Wilson
- Year: c 1762
- Type: Oil on canvas, landscape painting
- Dimensions: 73 cm × 46.4 cm (29 in × 18.3 in)
- Location: Tate Britain, London

The Thames near Marble Hill, Twickenham is a 1762 landscape painting by the British artist Richard Wilson. It depicts a view looking southwards across the River Thames to Marble Hill House. Both Richmond Hill and Twickenham were popular subjects for artists during the era.

The painting was submitted by Wilson to the Exhibition of 1762 held by the Society of Artists in Pall Mall. Today the painting is in the collection of the Tate Britain in Pimlico, having been acquired in 1937.

== Bibliography ==
- Bryant, Julius. The English Grand Tour: Artists and Admirers of England's Historic Sites. English Heritage, 2005.
- Bury, Adrian. Richard Wilson, R.A.: The Grand Classic. F. Lewis, 1947.
- Solkin, David H. Richard Wilson: The Landscape of Reaction. Tate Gallery, 1982.
