= The Lady's Last Stake =

Painting by William Hogarth

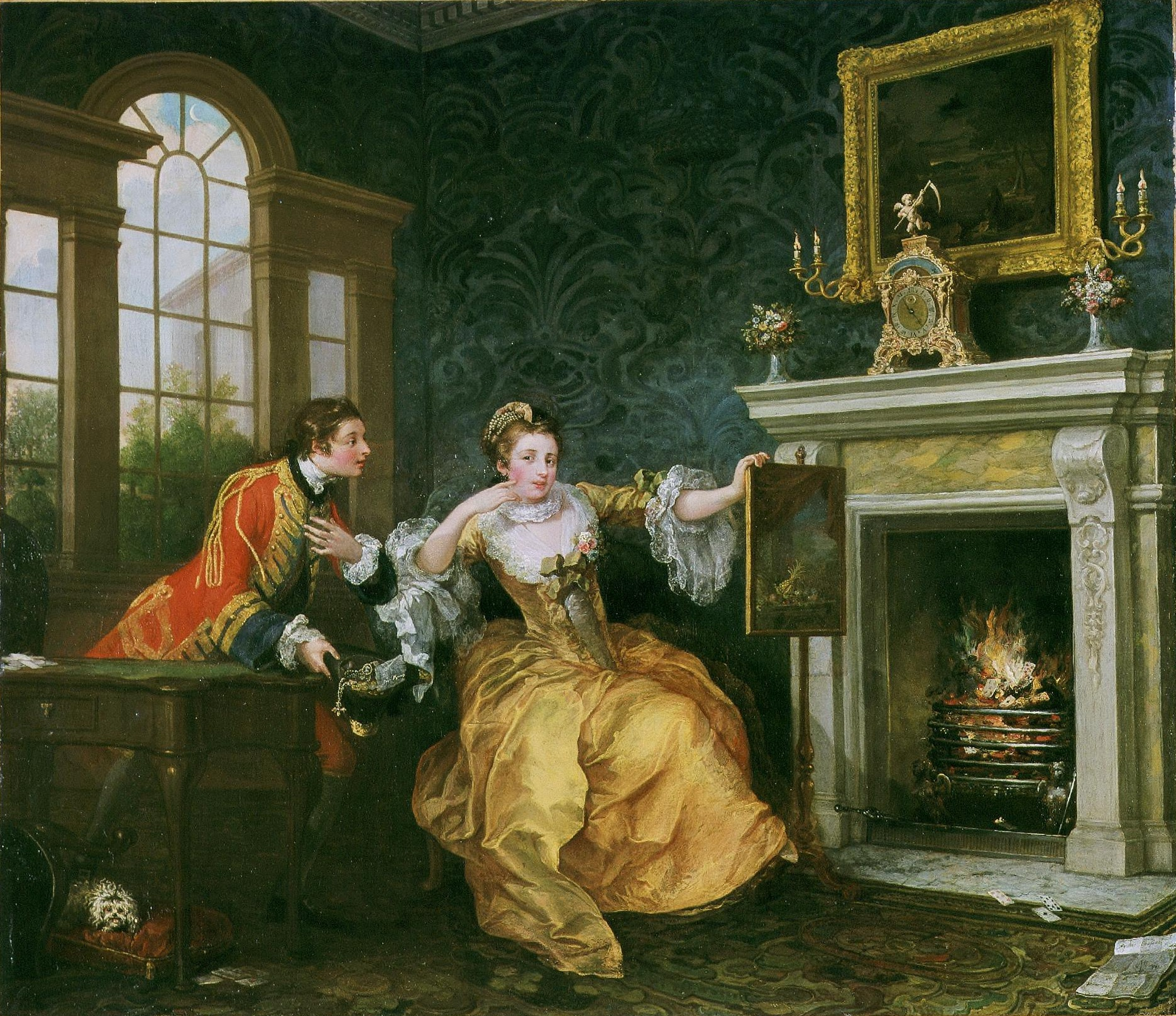
The Lady's Last Stake (c. 1759), Albright-Knox Art Gallery, Buffalo, New York

The Lady's Last Stake, originally entitled Piquet: or Virtue in Danger, is a painting by William Hogarth, c. 1759. The work is a conversation piece, capturing the moment when the woman has to make a fateful decision: to be ruined financially, or morally. It was one of Hogarth's last works, commissioned by James Caulfeild, 4th Viscount Charlemont (later 1st Earl of Charlemont), who allowed Hogarth to select the subject and price.

The painting depicts a domestic scene with a man and a woman who have been gambling, playing piquet at a table near an open fire and in front of a Venetian window in a well-appointed Palladian mansion. The woman has just lost her fortune to the man, an army officer. He offers to play one more game of cards: either way, he will return her assets, including the money and jewels in his tricorne hat; but if she loses, she must accept him as her lover. The woman clasps the edge of the fire screen as she considers his offer. The woman may be modelled on Hogarth's acquaintance Hester Salusbury (later Hester Thrale and then Hester Piozzi). On the floor is a discarded letter from her husband sending her money; it is addressed to Charlotte and signed Townly.

Details in the painting allude to the woman's fateful decision. A small dog (representing faithfulness) is hiding under the table. There is a painting of a Penitent Magdalene over the fireplace. The mantelpiece bears a clock with the usual figure of Father Time replaced by Cupid, but still carrying a scythe; the clock bears the motto "nunc nunc" (Latin: "now now"). The clock shows the time as 4:55 pm, and the horns of a crescent moon (alluding to the horns of a cuckold) are visible above the garden outside. The cards are being burned in the fire.

The work measures 91.44 by 105.41 centimetres (36.0 in × 41.5 in). It became known as The Lady's Last Stake after the 1707 comedy play The Lady’s Last Stake (subtitled "The Wife's Resentment") by Colley Cibber, in which Lady Gentle loses money to the cheating Lord George Brilliant, and must decide whether to pay her debts or settle them by compromising her fidelity to her husband.

When Sir Richard Grosvenor (later 1st Baron Grosvenor and then 1st Earl Grosvenor) saw the painting in Hogarth's studio in 1758, he asked Hogarth to paint a picture for him too on the same terms. Grosvenor was surprised by the result, the ambitiously melodramatic Sigismunda mourning over the Heart of Guiscardo, and Grosvenor rejected the painting when it was finished in 1759.

Charlemont accepted his painting, but permitted Hogarth to retain it for a period so he could engrave it. Hogarth was unhappy with the result, and it was discarded and not published. The work was exhibited at the Society of Artists inaugural Exhibition of 1761, and later engraved more successfully by Thomas Cheesman.

The painting was hung in the similarly Palladian style Charlemont House in Dublin, until it was sold by the family in 1874. The prominent positioning of an architectural set-piece by Hogarth in a Venetian window may have been in deference to the Earl, who had a particular love for neo-classical architecture and had recently returned from a Grand Tour of Europe at the time of the painting's commissioning.

It went through the hands of the art dealers Louis Huth and Thomas Agnew & Sons. It was acquired by J. P. Morgan in 1900, and was donated to the Albright-Knox Art Gallery by Seymour H. Knox, Jr in 1945.

== See also ==
- List of works by William Hogarth
