= Richard Livesay =

British painter & engraver (1750–1826)

Richard Livesay (1750–1826) was a British portrait and landscape painter, and engraver.

== Life ==
Livesay was a pupil of Benjamin West, and began his career in London, exhibiting for the first time at the Royal Academy in 1776. Between 1777 and 1785 he lodged with Jane Hogarth in Leicester Fields.

Engaged by West to copy pictures at Windsor, Livesay moved there about 1790, and gave lessons in drawing to some of the royal children. In 1796 he was appointed drawing-master to the Royal Naval Academy at Portsmouth, and lived in Portsea. On an address card which he issued at that time he described himself as "Portrait, Landscape, and Marine Painter, Drawing-Master to the Royal Academy, Portsmouth, 61 Hanover Street, Portsea."

Livesay died at Southsea in 1826.

== Works ==
Livesay executed for Jane Hogarth a series of facsimiles of drawings by William Hogarth, her late husband, among them seven illustrating the well-known Tour, published in 1782. While at Windsor he painted portraits of young Etonians, generally small whole-lengths, and a picture by him of Eton Boys going to Montem is in the possession of Eton College, to which it was presented by the Duke of Newcastle in 1891.

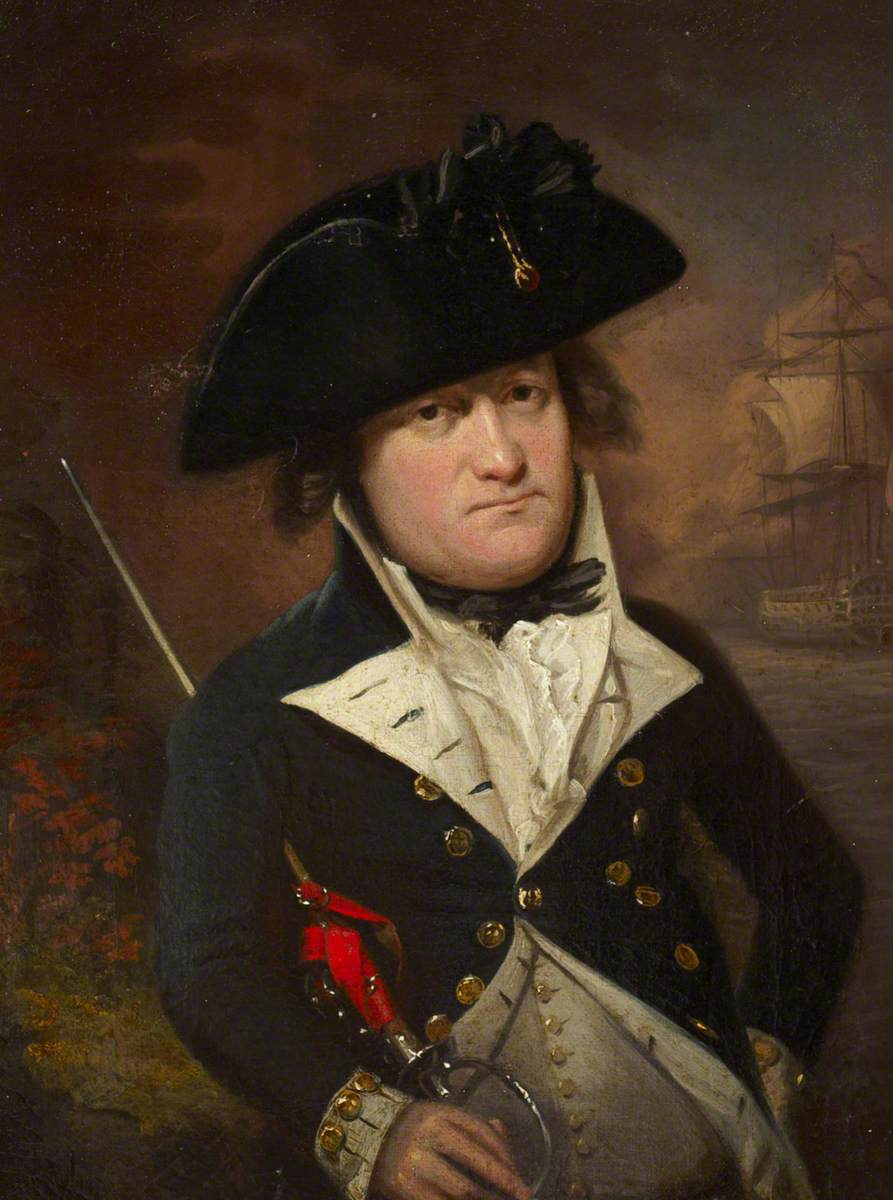
Richard Livesay, Portrait of a Naval Lieutenant, c.1795

In the wartime years, Livesay painted English warships and their French prizes, and in 1800 he published a set of four plates of the reviews of the Isle of Wight volunteers, aquatinted by John Wells. He painted a large picture of the review of the Hertfordshire volunteers by the king in Hatfield Park, 13 June 1800, which was engraved by J. C. Stadler, and once hung in Lord Salisbury's town house, 20 Arlington Street.

Livesay was an exhibitor at the Royal Academy of portraits and domestic subjects up to 1821; his Genius and Industry, Cottage Spinsters, and Young Foresters were mezzotinted by George Dawe and John Murphy, and his portraits of Queen Charlotte, Dr. Willis, George Byng, M.P., Dr. Fothergill, Sir Thomas Louis, bart., and others, were engraved.

A portrait by Livesay of James Caulfeild, 1st Earl of Charlemont has a copy in the National Portrait Gallery, London. The version in the National Gallery of Ireland is taken to be the original.
