= Robert Orme (British Army officer) =

British Army officer (1725–1781/1790)

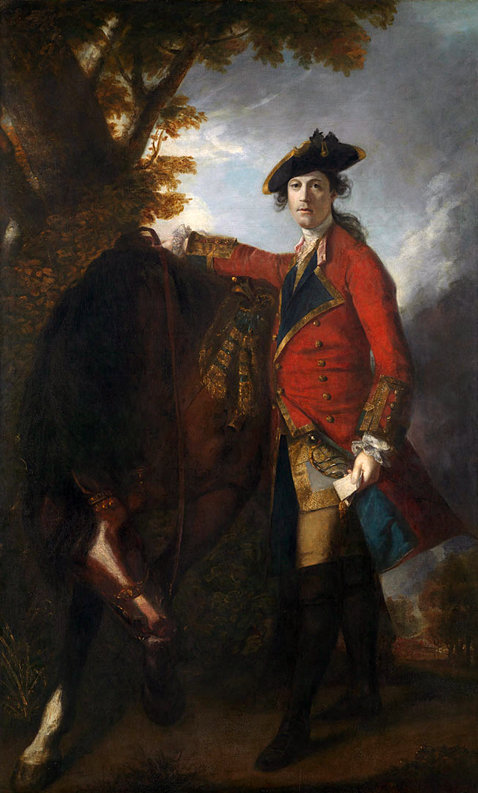
Portrait of Robert Orme by Sir Joshua Reynolds, 1756

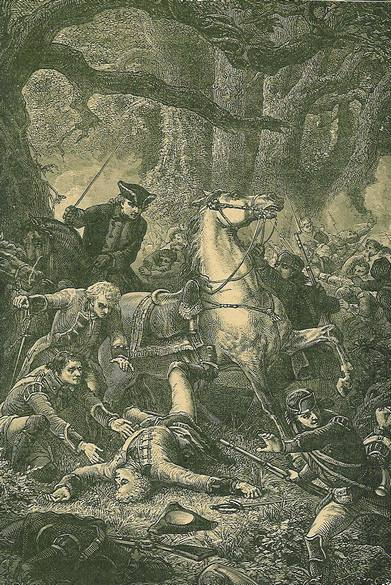
The death of General Braddock as imagined in a nineteenth-century engraving

Captain Robert Orme (c. 1725 – 1781/1790) was a British Army officer who took part in the Battle of the Monongahela on 9 July 1755 at the beginning of the French and Indian War, during which he was injured. He served with the young George Washington, with whom he became friends, and soon after his return to England in 1755 was painted by Joshua Reynolds.

== Early life ==
Robert Orme was born c. 1725. His family origins are unknown but he is not thought to have been of aristocratic birth.

== Career ==
Orme entered the British army as an ensign in the 35th Regiment of Foot but transferred to the Coldstream Guards in 1745. He became a lieutenant in that regiment in 1751.

By the time of the French and Indian War, Orme was aide-de-camp to General Edward Braddock. Although officially a lieutenant, he became a brevet captain and was known as Captain Orme. Also serving as an aide to Braddock was George Washington who wished to acquire military experience and with whom Orme became friends.

In 1755, Braddock was engaged in a push by British and American forces towards Fort Duquesne, in what is now Pittsburgh in Pennsylvania, which was held by French opposing forces. In July that year, Braddock's army was decisively defeated by a French and native Indian force in the Battle of the Monongahela with nearly 900 British and American soldiers killed or wounded. Braddock was mortally wounded and Orme shot in the leg. Some of the dead were scalped by the Native American allies of the French and their scalps nailed to trees in order to terrify the British. Orme escaped in the disorderly retreat and returned to England in 1755, becoming something of a celebrity as a survivor of the massacre. He resigned from the army in 1756.

Orme's account of the campaign was published in 1856 in an edition edited by Winthrop Sargent of the Historical Society of Pennsylvania.

== Family ==
After his return to England, Orme resigned his commission in the army and eloped with Audrey Townshend (died 1781), the only daughter of Charles Townshend, 3rd Viscount Townshend of Raynham and his wife Audrey, Lady Townshend.

== Death ==
Orme died in 1790 according to modern sources, or in February 1781 according to a source published in 1856.

== See also ==
- Thomas Gage
