= Jane Hogarth =

British print seller and businesswoman

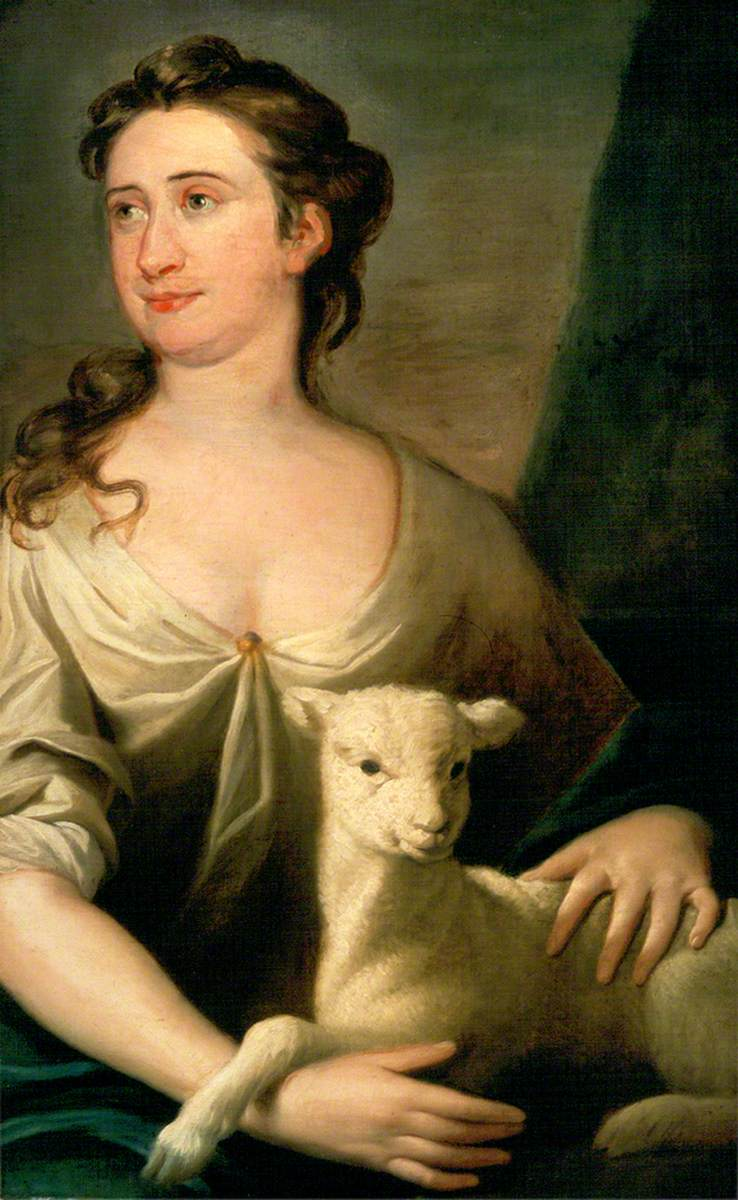
- Hogarth by William Hogarth, c. 1750
- Born: Jane Thornhill c. 1709
- Died: 13 November 1789 (aged c. 80); Chiswick, England, Great Britain
- Spouse: William Hogarth (m. 1729; died 1764)
- Father: James Thornhill

Jane Hogarth (c. 1709 – 13 November 1789) was a British printseller and businesswoman who preserved the rights to the artwork of her husband, William Hogarth, after his death. She successfully continued to produce and sell his work for many years.

== Early life and marriage ==
She was born Jane Thornhill around 1709, the daughter of James Thornhill, a prominent painter at the time, and his wife Judith. In 1729, she married William Hogarth at Paddington, without her father's permission. After a period of difficulty with her father, in 1731, William moved in with her at her home in the Great Piazza on London's Covent Garden.

As William Hogarth became more successful, the couple bought a second house in Chiswick, where many prominent scholars and performers of the time lived. They had no children, but were involved in Thomas Coram's Foundling Hospital.

In 1760, William Hogarth fell ill, eventually moving from Chiswick back to their Covent Garden house, with Jane staying behind. In 1764, William died, leaving her the print business in his will.

== Widow in business ==
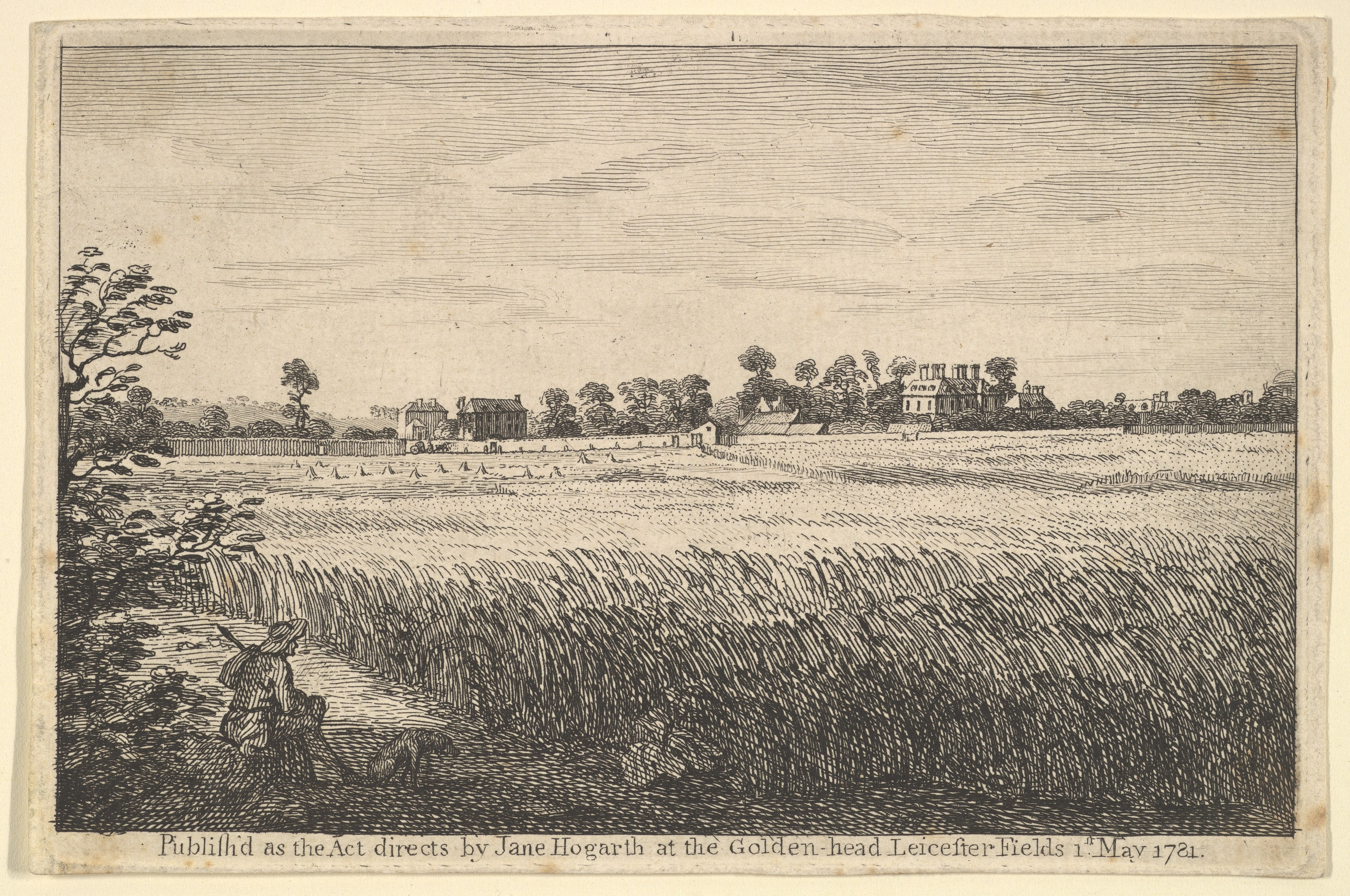
View of Ranby's House, published by Jane Hogarth 1781

Following the death of her husband William, whom she outlived by 25 years, Jane Hogarth continued to sell his work. She guarded his reputation and kept his papers. Her control over William's copperplates was conditional: she could not sell them without the permission of William's sister Anne Hogarth, and paid Anne an annuity from the sale of prints. She began publishing editions of engravings in 1765, and saw to the longer term rights in 1767 by approaching parliament.

The protection under the Engraving Copyright Act 1734 was expiring on William Hogarth's earlier works. Jane Hogarth ensured that she regained the protections of her husband's initial copyright. The bill of 29 June 1767 extended her rights from fourteen years to twenty years, giving her "the sole right and liberty of printing and reprinting all the said prints, etchings, and engravings, of the design and invention of the said William Hogarth, for and during the term of twenty years".

Hogarth produced prints and advertised them as authentic works of William Hogarth, emphasising their moral nature. A cumulative tradition of commentary and biography was founded on the Lettres (1746) of the French miniaturist Jean André Rouquet, in London under George II, and anecdotes supplied by Horace Walpole. Jane Hogarth produced an edition with Rev. John Trusler titled Hogarth Moralized (1768). Bowdlerised versions appeared in the 19th century. She had strong objections to Biographical Anecdotes of William Hogarth (1781) by John Nichols, who found Trusler "dull and languid".

Printer Robert Sayer also had an "almost complete set of copies" of painter William Hogarth's plates and sold prints at prices that undercut those of Jane Hogarth.

Hogarth also broadened her range. Bringing in John Keyse Sherwin, Hogarth published The Politician in 1774, an engraving from a sketch supposed to have been made by William for his friend Ebenezer Forrest, which became included with prints of her husband's works. Hogarth also worked with Richard Livesay. They had a painting by William Hogarth turned into a print engraved by Francesco Bartolozzi, sold as Shrimps!.

Eventually, as the sale of the prints lost value, Hogarth was given a pension by the Royal Academy.

== Death and legacy ==
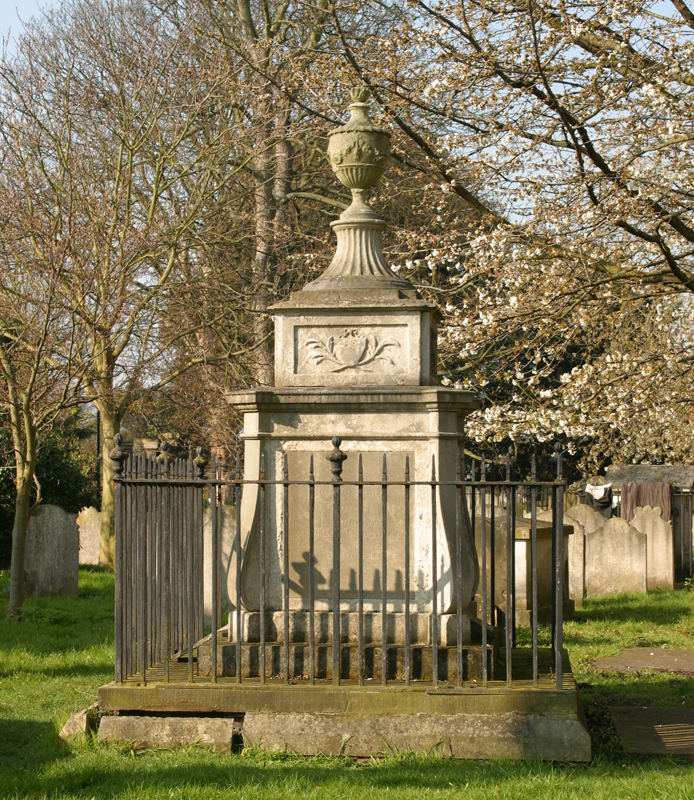
William and Jane Hogarth's tomb

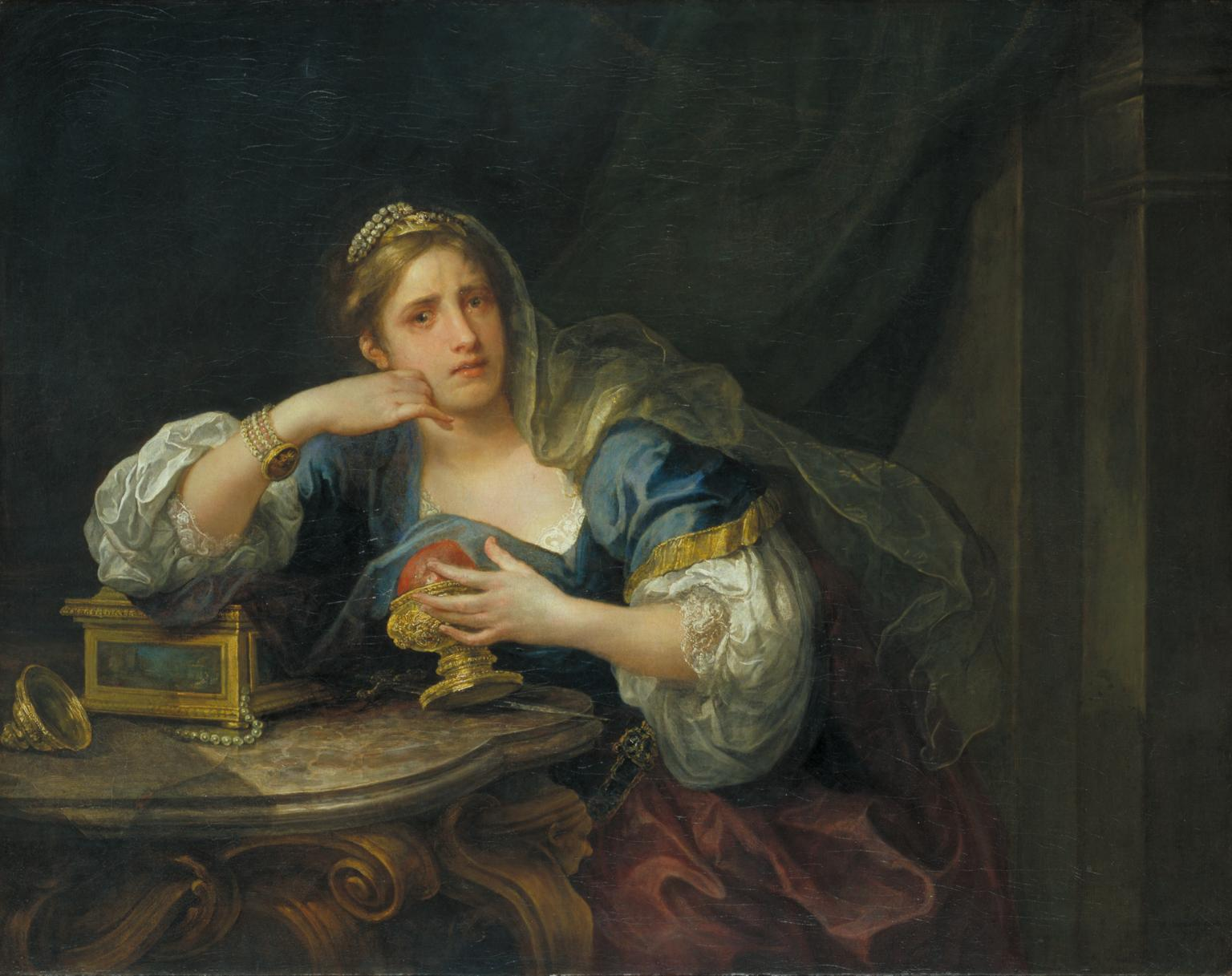
Sigismunda mourning over the Heart of Guiscardo by William Hogarth, for which Jane Hogarth was the model, sold in 1790, to John Boydell

Hogarth died on 13 November 1789 in Chiswick.

Her estate passed to Mary Lewis, her cousin; who sold the rights to William Hogarth's copper plates to John Boydell, for an annuity. Much of the remaining Hogarth collections, including Sigismunda mourning over the Heart of Guiscardo and works by James Thornhill, was put up for sale, with John Greenwood as auctioneer, on 24 April 1790. John Ireland bought papers from Mary Lewis, resulting in scholarly works, Hogarth Illustrated (1791, 2 vols.) and A Supplement to Hogarth Illustrated, a biography (1798).

Today the house in Chiswick is a museum.

=== Mary Lewis ===
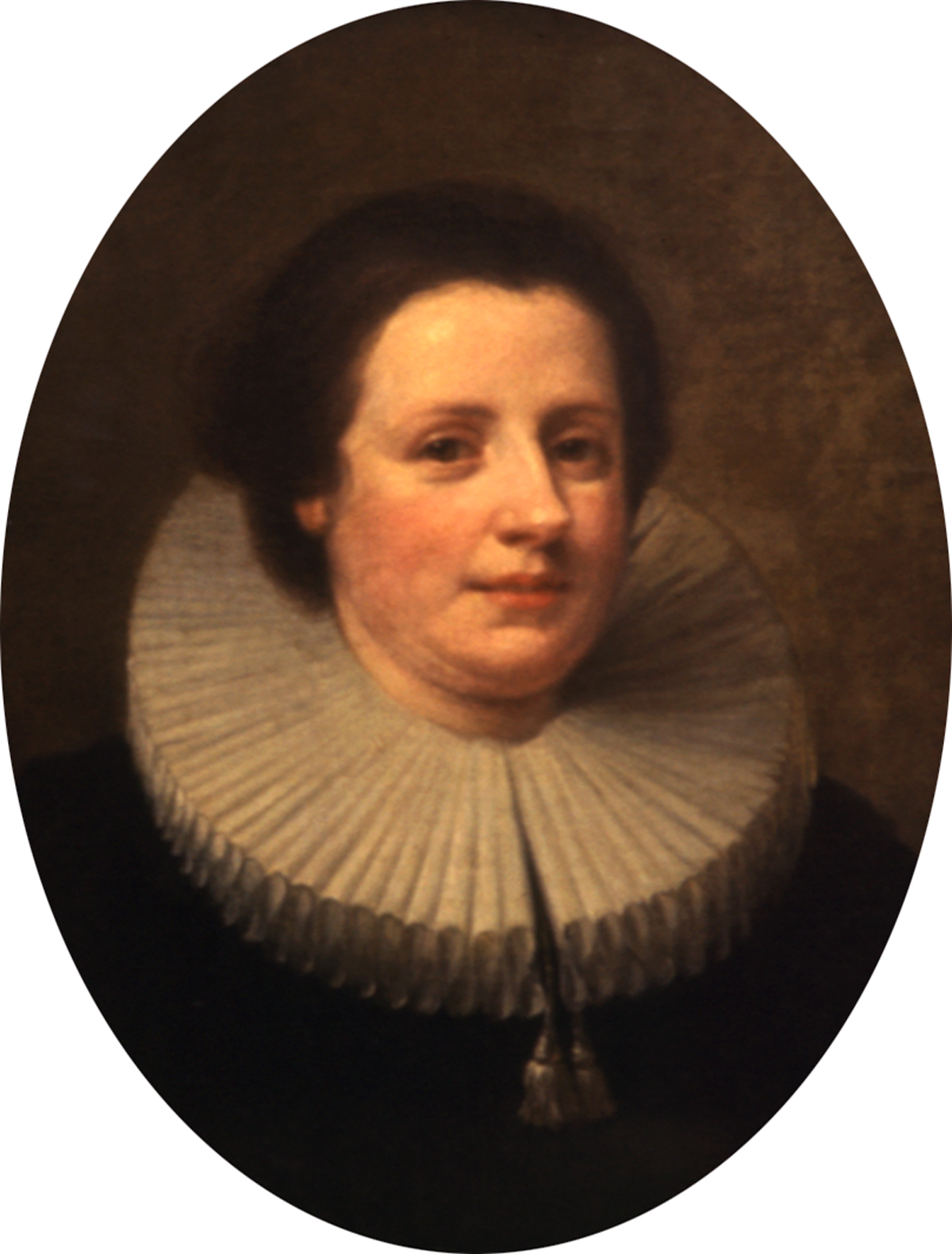
Mary Lewis, portrait by William Hogarth

Mary Lewis was companion to Jane Hogarth, a first cousin, and a member of the Hogarth household remembered in William Hogarth's will. She was also involved in the prints business, from 1764, with Jane and Anne Hogarth.

She was daughter of David Lewis who was harpist to George II and a sitter for William Hogarth, and died in 1808. The remaining Hogarth collections then went to Phil(l)ip Francis Hast (died 1823), a cousin, of the household of the future George IV. Eventually they passed, in 1939, to Aberdeen Art Gallery.
