= First Exhibition (1760) =

1760 exhibition of contemporary art

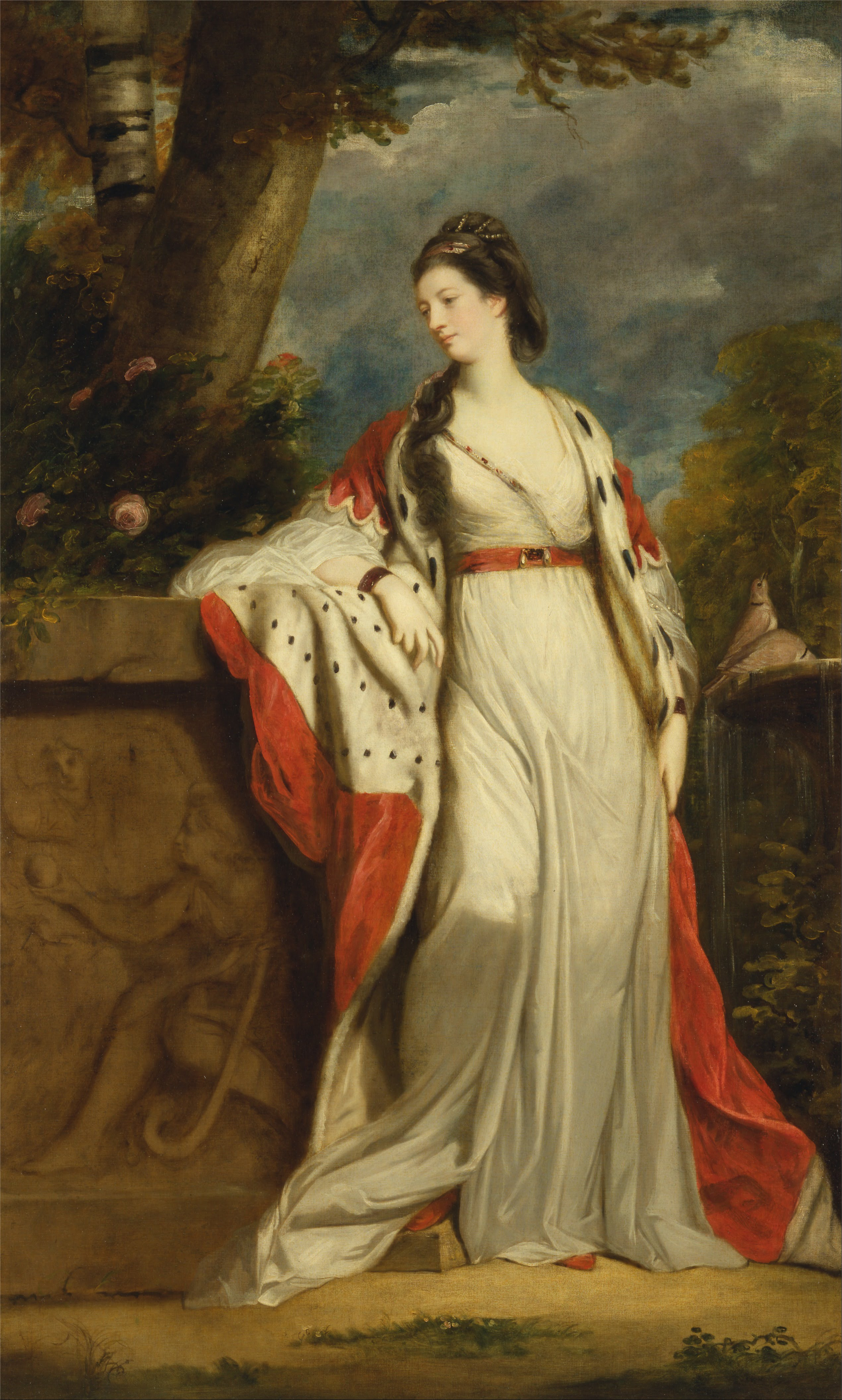
This Portrait of Elizabeth Gunning, Duchess of Hamilton and Argyll by Joshua Reynolds was one of the paintings shown for the first time at the 1760 exhibition. Imperial Magazine said in its coverage that it made the duchess look like "the Queen of all grace and beauty".

The Society for the Encouragement of Arts, Manufactures and Commerce held the first modern public exhibition on 21 April 1760 in London. It would be the first in a series of fine art exhibitions held by the institution later known as the Society of Arts. Prizes were offered for improvements in the manufacture of tapestry, carpets and porcelain, and winners were chosen from a competition of submitted articles. The show was open to society members and their friends.

== Background ==
The Society for the Encouragement of Arts, Manufactures and Commerce was founded in 1754 and soon attracted some of the leading artists in the country. It was also known as the "Premium Society" because they offered cash premiums to encourage inventors and artists in their work. Its ten fellows included Benjamin Franklin, Jonas Hanway, William Hogarth, Thomas Hollis, Samuel Johnson, and William Shipley. They met at first at a coffee house in Covent Garden in 1754. The first awards given by the society were for discovering cobalt, raising and curing madder, and shipping breadfruit, and they had an emphasis on improving farming techniques.

By 1756 the need for an exhibition of fine art was recognised, with William Hogarth presenting a paper entitled "Containing some Hints relating to the Premiums for Drawings for the Future". By 1759 a 100-guinea premium for historical painting was established, and Robert Edge Pine proposed that the society hire a room to exhibit some works. Throughout the year many of the society's artists became involved.

== Exhibition ==
The exhibition ran from 21 April 1760, with the exhibitors styled just as "the present artists". Admission to the event was free, but a catalogue was available for sixpence, with 6,582 catalogues being sold. It is estimated that 20,000 visitors attended the fortnight that the exhibition was open. There were hundreds of paintings, statues and illustrations from 68 artists shown in the exhibition, including men such as Joshua Reynolds, Benjamin Wilson, Richard Cosway and Louis-François Roubiliac. No visual record, no drawings or engravings, exists of the exhibition. We know, however, that among the exhibits were works such as Roubiliac's Statue of Shakespeare and Edward Edwards's David Garrick in the Character of Richard the Third. Welsh landscape painter Richard Wilson used the exhibition to show, for the first time, one of his most significant paintings of his career, The Destruction of the Children of Niobe.

Although the exhibition was considered a success from a financial point of view, with artists being left with a balance of £100 from the sale of the catalogues, the exhibition was not widely covered in contemporary papers and journals, with the press not taking notice of the annual exhibitions until the 1770s. The only review of the event was published shortly after the event in the Imperial Magazine.

== Legacy ==
Plans for a follow-up event, expected to take place the next year, caused difficulties when the suggestion of levelling a charge of one shilling to attend the event split the academy into two, the Free Society of Artists (FSA) and the Society of Artists of Great Britain (SAGB). Both of these groups would go on to organise annual events on their own terms. However, leading artists would usually join the SAGB, which consequently would become the leading society of artists.
