= Society of Artists of Great Britain =

Historic art organisation in London

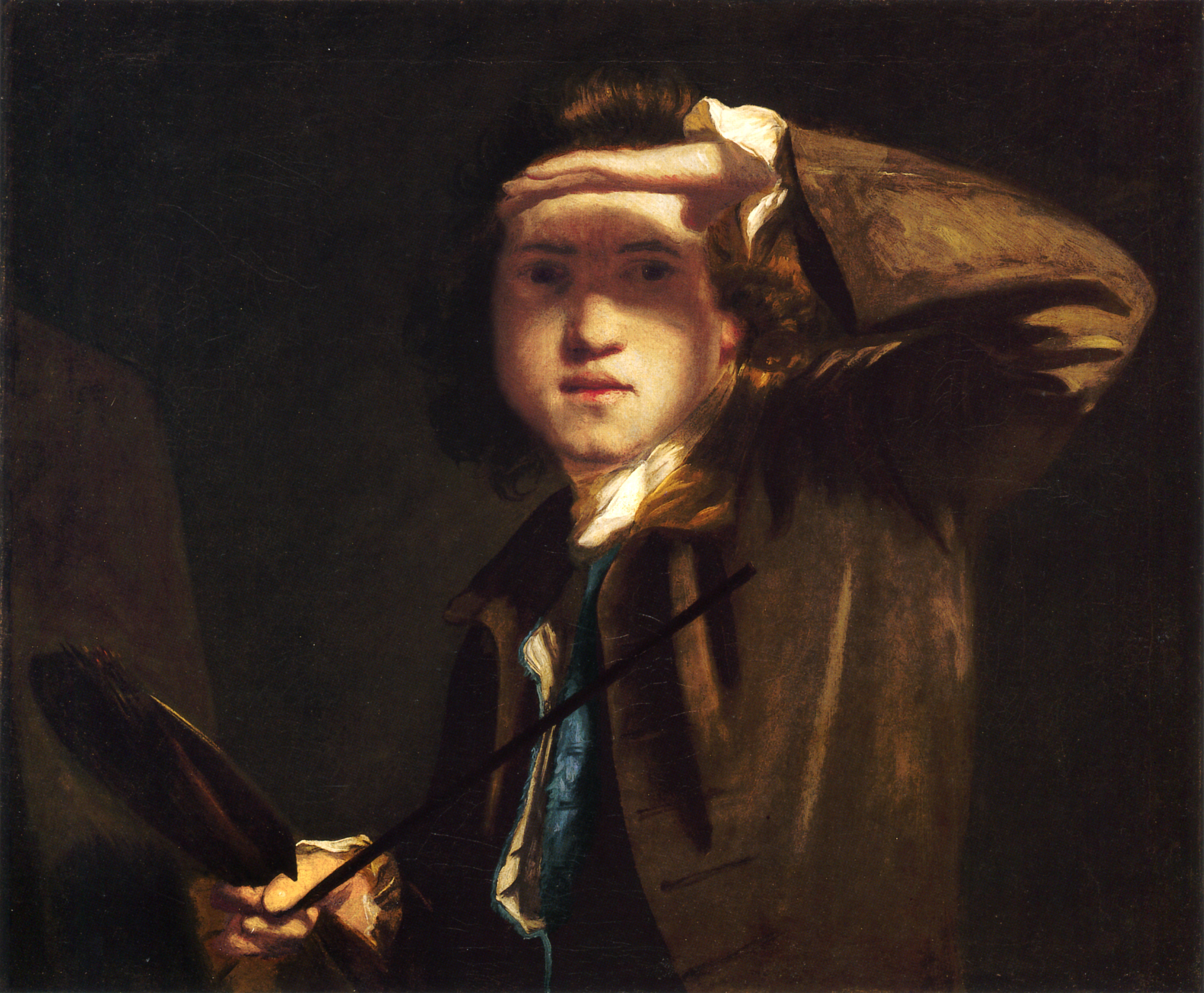
Joshua Reynolds was a member of the Society (self-portrait c. 1748).

The Society of Artists of Great Britain was founded in London in May 1761 by an association of artists in order to provide a venue for the public exhibition of recent work by living artists, such as was having success in the long-established Paris Salons. Leading members seceded from the society in 1768, a move leading directly to the formation of the Royal Academy of Arts. The society was dissolved in 1791 after years of decline.

== History ==
The Society of Artists of Great Britain began in 1761 as a loose association of artists, including Joshua Reynolds and Francis Hayman, who wanted greater control by artists over exhibitions of their work previously organised by William Shipley's Society of Arts (founded in 1754) which had organised the First Exhibition in April 1760, which over a thousand visitors per day attended. The following year the breakaways staged the Exhibition of 1761, their inaugural exhibition at Christopher Cock's Auction Rooms in Spring Gardens, Charing Cross, and "In a conspicuous gesture they called themselves the Society of Artists of Great Britain to emphasise their identity with the 'nation' and to announce a clear split with Shipley's faction." Some 13,000 people bought a copy of the catalogue for the 1761 exhibition which featured a frontispiece designed by William Hogarth depicting Britannia watering three trees marked Painting, Sculpture and Architecture. Another exhibition was held in 1762 and it became an annual event.

In 1765, the Society, then comprising 211 members, obtained a Royal Charter as the "Incorporated Society of Artists of Great Britain".

Reynolds would later be a founder of the Royal Academy of Arts, after an unseemly leadership dispute between two leading architects, Sir William Chambers and James Paine had split the Society. Paine won, but Chambers used his strong connections with George III to create the new body – the Royal Academy of Arts was formally launched in 1769 and held its inaugural Royal Academy Exhibition of 1769 in Pall Mall. In May June 1769 the Society responded by expelling 33 leading artists who had exhibited with the Royal Academy. George Stubbs remained loyal to the Society until 1774, serving as its President from October 1772 to October 1773. His leadership was undermined by further defections to the Royal Academy and the financially unwise decision of Paine to construct large new premises in the Strand where the 1772 Exhibition was held. By 1776 the new headquarters had to be sold. Joseph Wright of Derby was another figure who stayed with the Society, where he exhibited from 1765 to 1776. George Romney and William Marlow also continued to feature at Society exhibitions.

However, the Society of Artists of Great Britain continued its occasional schedule of exhibitions until 1791, while those who remained with the older "Society of Arts" now called themselves the "Free Society of Artists" (1761–1783).

== See also ==
- Society of Artists (Australia)
- Society of Artists in Ireland

== References and sources ==
Sources

- Graves, Algernon, ed. (1907). The Society of Artists of Great Britain, 1760–1791 and the Free Society of Artists, 1761–1783: a Complete Dictionary of Contributors and their Work from the Foundation of the Societies to 1791. London: G. Bell and Sons.

== Bibliography ==
- Egerton, Judy. George Stubbs, Painter. Yale University Press, 2007.
- Hargraves, Matthew. Candidates for Fame: The Society of Artists of Great Britain, 1760-1791. Paul Mellon Centre for Studies in British Art, 2005.
