= Spring Gardens =

Street in St James's, London

Coordinates: 51.5065°N 0.1279°W

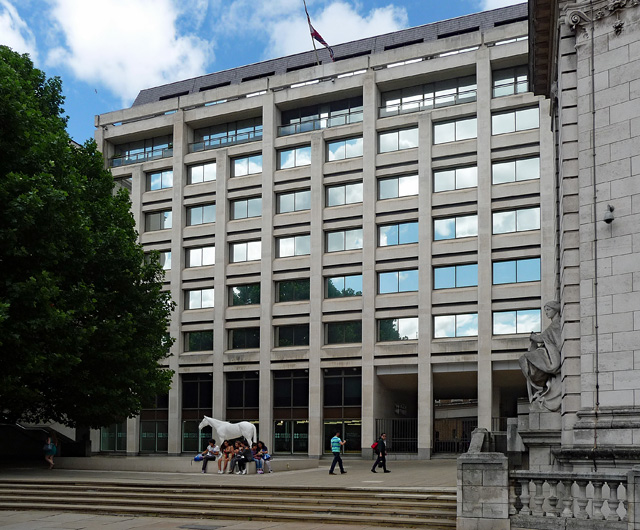
10 Spring Gardens was formerly the British Council's headquarters building in London

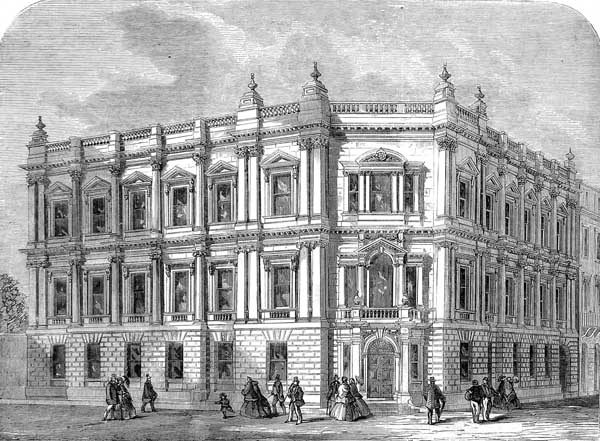
Metropolitan Board of Works in 1860

Spring Gardens is a dead-end street at the south east extreme of St. James's, London, England, that crosses the east end of The Mall between Admiralty Arch and Trafalgar Square. Part of the old liberty of Westminster and the current City of Westminster, it abuts Whitehall, Horse Guards Parade, Green Park, and the Charing Cross/Strand/Trafalgar Square locality.

It is named after the gardens that stood here. These featured a decorative fountain in the time of Elizabeth I that was set in motion by passers-by treading on hidden machinery, knowingly or unknowingly. Mostly Victorian buildings have been built lining the street.

== Occupants ==
The Whig playwright and poet Susanna Centlivre (c. 1669 – 1723), who has been described as "the most successful female playwright of the eighteenth century", spent the end of her life here, and wrote her most famous work A Bold Stroke for a Wife at her home at the corner of Buckingham Court, Spring Gardens, in 1718.

The 19th-century architect Decimus Burton bought a plot at Spring Gardens, where he constructed Nos. 10, 12, and 14 Spring Gardens as both his townhouse and his own office.

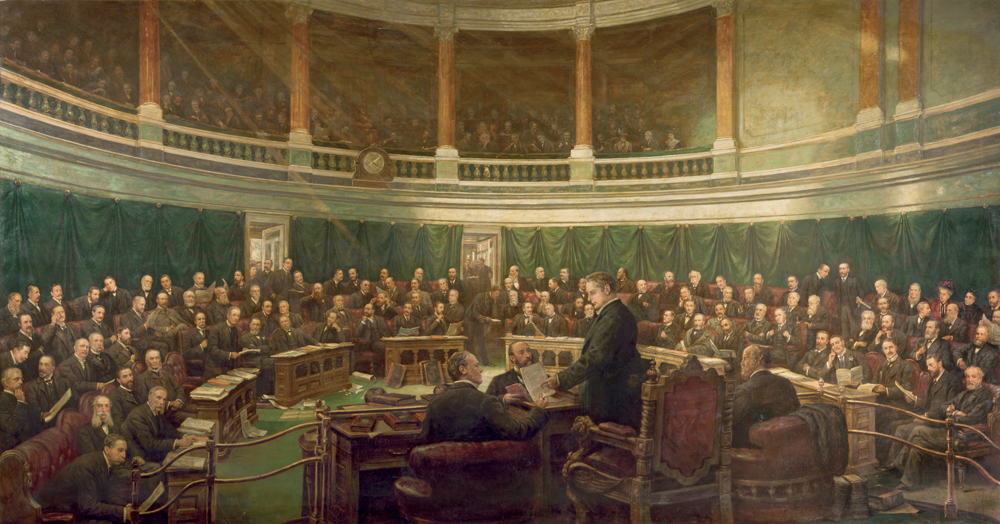
The First Meeting of the London County Council in the County Hall Spring Gardens, 1889 by Henry Jamyn Brooks

The headquarters of the Metropolitan Board of Works, which had moved from the London Guildhall, was based at Spring Gardens, as was the London County Council, until it moved to County Hall. This building has since been demolished.

The area hosted an open-air market for milk, the Milk Fair, from the formation of the Mall; this was closed before World War I.

The buildings now at Spring Gardens include:

- The Trafalgar Hotel
- The former headquarters (from 1974 to 2020) of the British Council
- The National Institute for Health and Care Excellence (NICE)'s London site, since 2013.
