= Falls of Niagara =

Painting by Richard Wilson

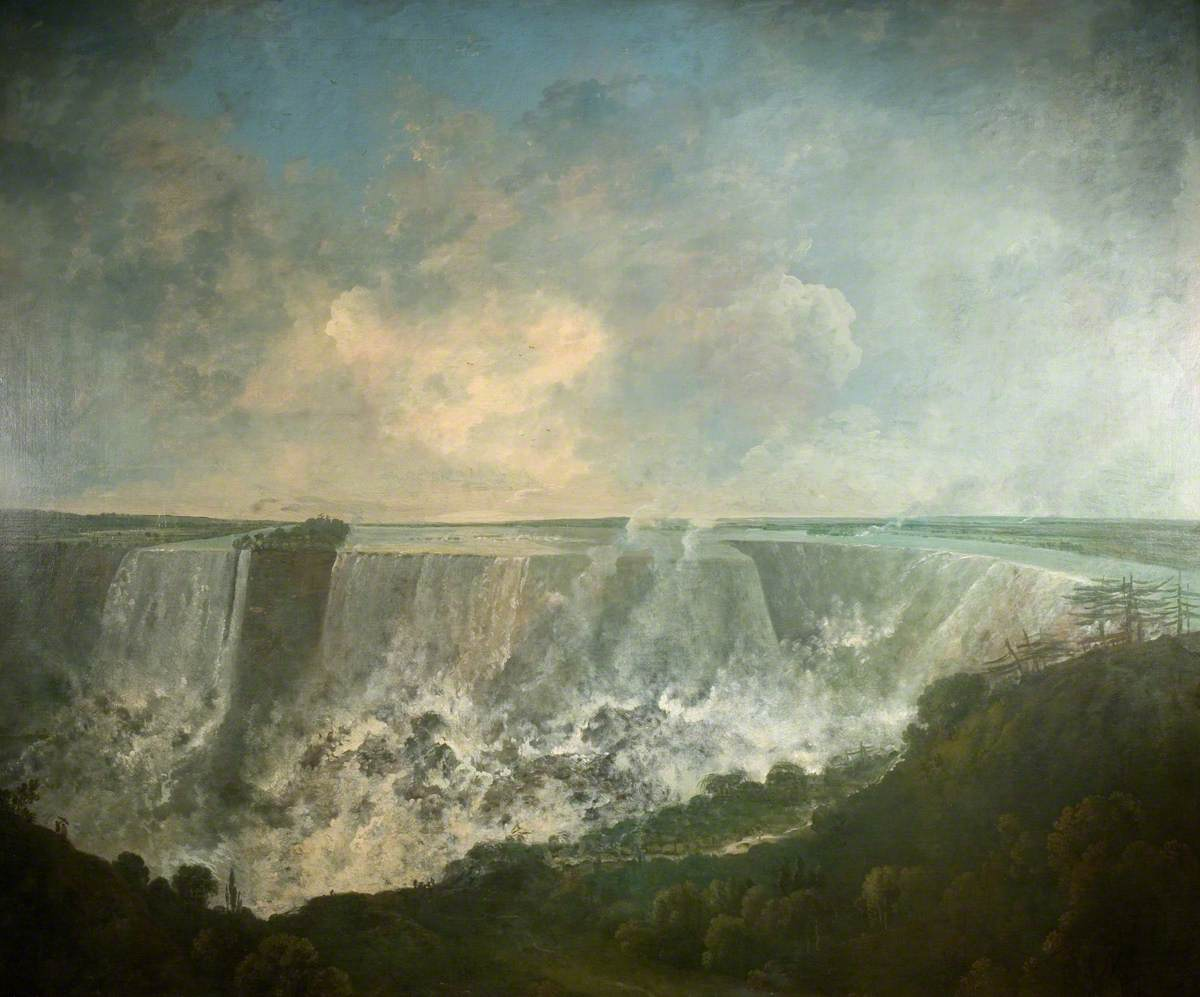
- Artist: Richard Wilson
- Year: 1774
- Type: Oil on canvas, landscape painting
- Dimensions: 154 cm × 185 cm (61 in × 73 in)
- Location: Wolverhampton Art Gallery, Wolverhampton

Falls of Niagara is a 1774 landscape painting by the British artist Richard Wilson. It depicts a view of Niagara Falls. Wilson had never visited North America, but based this scene on a sketch produced by an officer of the Royal Artillery. It was likely commissioned by the engraver William Byrne who planned to make a print based on the picture. It is strikingly different from many of Wilson's paintings, more obviously reflecting the Sublime that would become such a feature during the Romantic movement.

The painting was displayed at the Royal Academy Exhibition of 1774 held in Pall Mall in London. Today it is in the collection of the Wolverhampton Art Gallery which acquired it in 1884.

== Bibliography ==
- Gassan, Richard H. The Birth of American Tourism: New York, the Hudson Valley, and American Culture, 1790-1830. University of Massachusetts Press, 2008.
- New, W.H. Land Sliding: Imagining Space, Presence, and Power in Canadian Writing. University of Toronto Press, 1997.
- Solkin, David H. Richard Wilson: The Landscape of Reaction. Tate Gallery, 1982.
