= Syon House from Richmond Gardens =

Painting by Richard Wilson

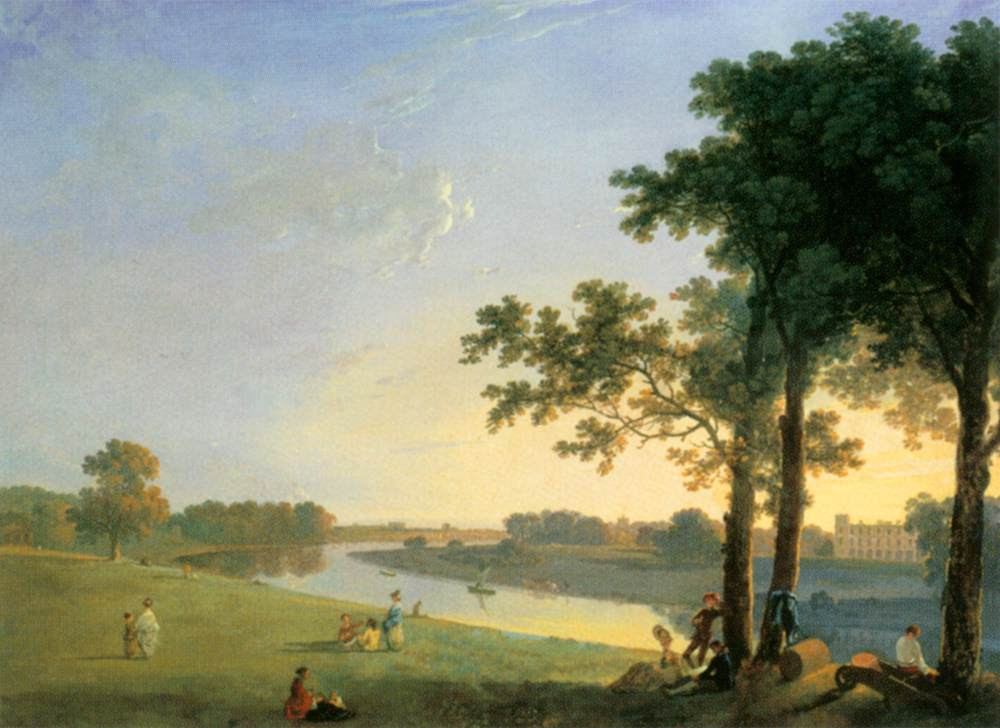
- Artist: Richard Wilson
- Year: c.1761
- Type: Oil on canvas, landscape painting
- Dimensions: 104 cm × 139 cm (41 in × 55 in)
- Location: Neue Pinakothek, Munich

Syon House from Richmond Gardens is a c.1761 landscape painting by the British artist Richard Wilson. It depicts a view on the River Thames to the west of London. Looking across the river from Kew Gardens it features Syon House near Brentford the residence of the Duke of Northumberland. Kew Gardens had recently been established as a botanical garden by Princess Augusta. Wilson's title references the nearby town of Richmond. Following time spent in Rome Wilson has returned to produce landscapes of British with a distinct Italianate look. This painting's colours seem influenced by the works of Claude Lorrain.

There is no record of a commission from the Northumberland family so this painting was likely created as an attractive, well-known stretch of river rather than a specific depiction of the house. A number of different versions were produced by Wilson of the scene, as was common with his more popular paintings. A version was displayed at the Royal Academy Exhibition of 1776 held in Pall Mall. Today its in the collection of the Neue Pinakothek in Munich.

== Bibliography ==
- Bury, Adrian. Richard Wilson, R.A.: The Grand Classic. F. Lewis, 1947.
- Büttner Nils. The History of Gardens in Painting. WW Norton, 2008.
- Solkin, David H. Richard Wilson: The Landscape of Reaction. Tate Gallery, 1982.
