= Rome from the Ponte Molle =

Painting by Richard Wilson

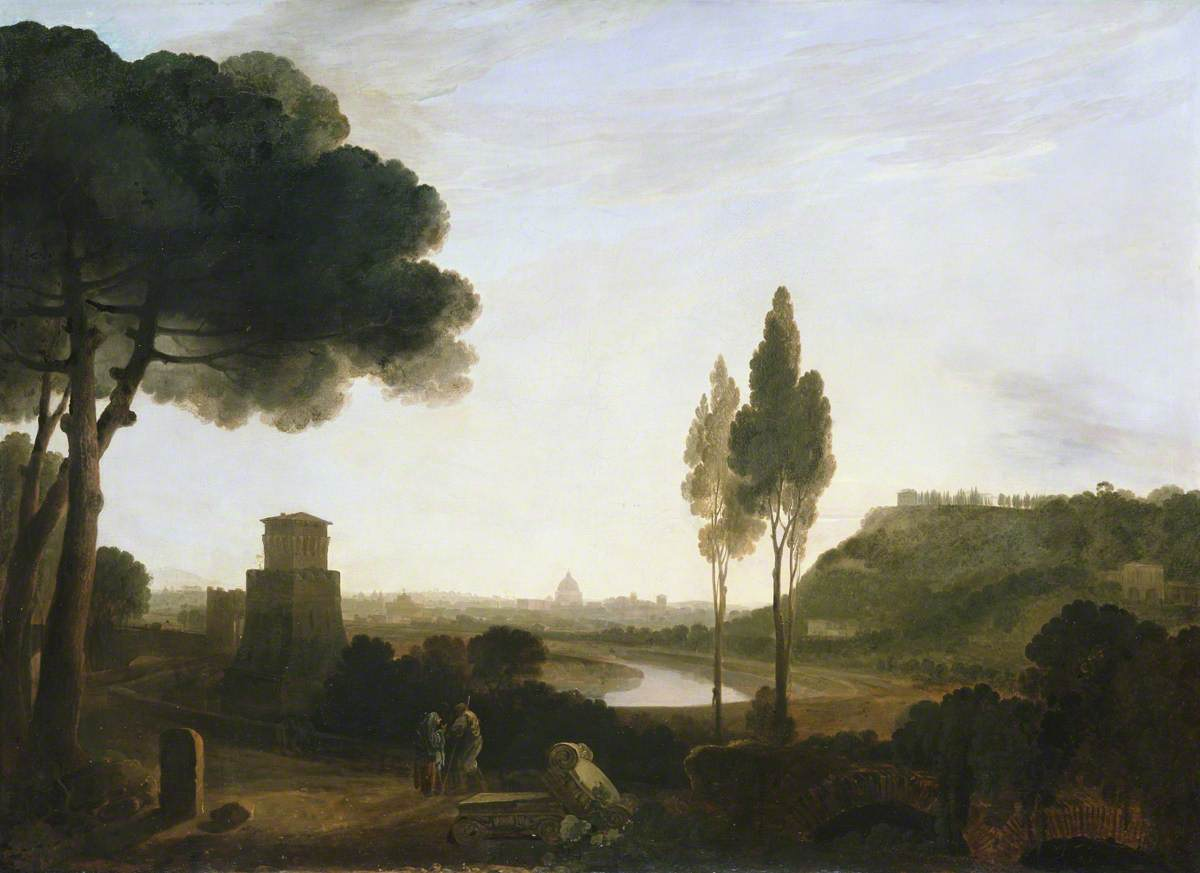
- Artist: Richard Wilson
- Year: 1754
- Type: Oil on canvas, landscape painting
- Medium: oil paint, canvas
- Dimensions: 100.5 cm × 137 cm (39.6 in × 54 in)
- Location: National Museum of Wales, Cardiff
- Accession no.: NMW A 70
- Identifiers: Art UK artwork ID: rome-from-the-ponte-molle-160420

Rome from the Ponte Molle is a 1754 landscape painting by the British artist Richard Wilson. It features a view of the city of Rome in the distance from the Ponte Molle.

== Description ==
The Welsh Wilson was a pioneering British landscape painter. From 1750 to 1757 he moved to Italy where his style of painting sharply altered. He had an influence in future generations of artists such as J.M.W. Turner.

This work was purchased in 1950 for the collection of the National Museum of Wales in Cardiff.

== Bibliography ==
- Evans, Mark & Fairclough, Oliver. The National Museum of Wales :A Companion Guide to the National Art Gallery. National Museum of Wales, 1993.
- Hamilton, James. Turner and Italy. National Galleries of Scotland, 2009.
- Solkin, David H. Richard Wilson: The Landscape of Reaction. Tate Gallery, 1982.
