= Richard Wilson (painter) =

Welsh painter (1714-1782)

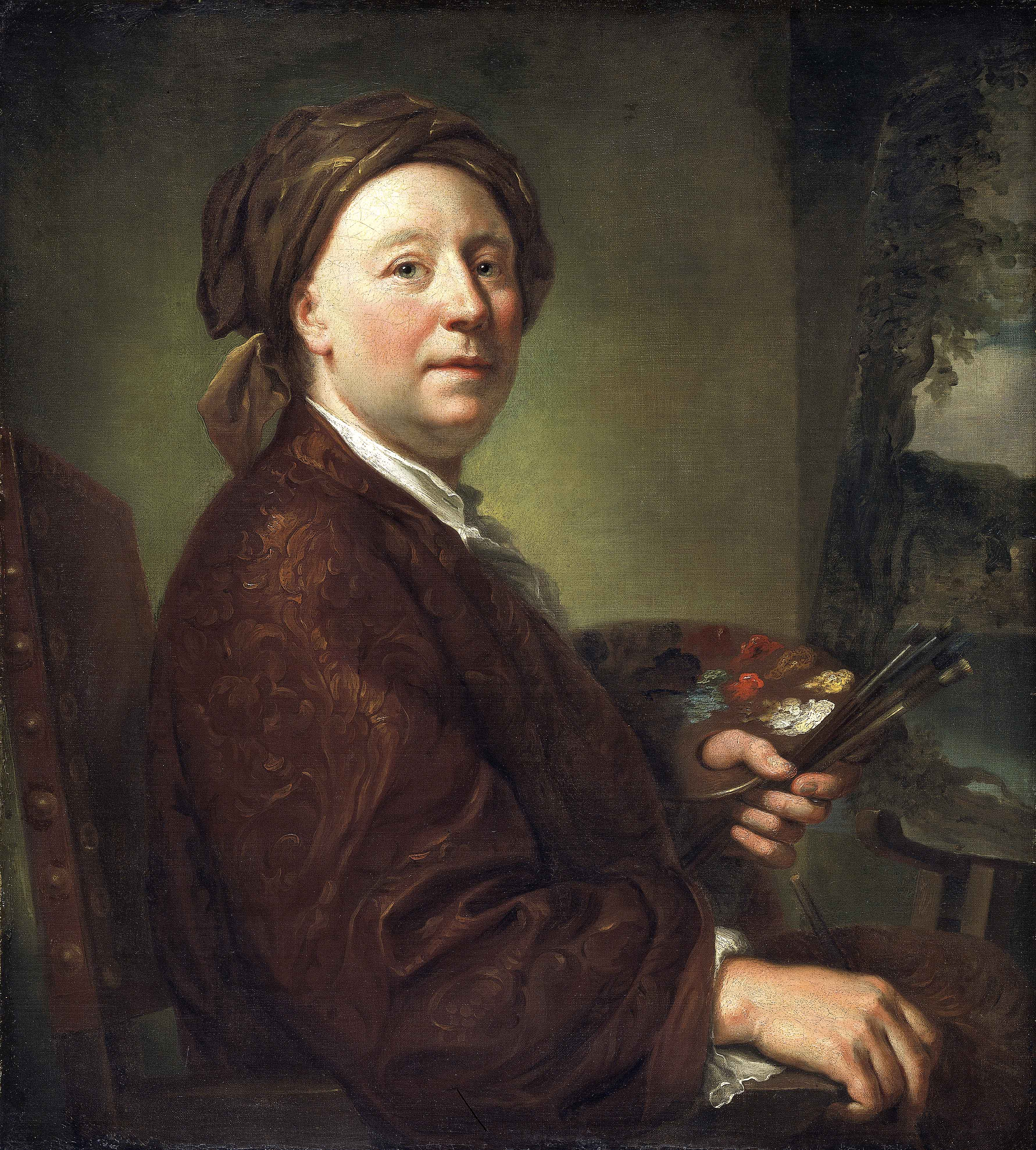
- Portrait of Wilson by Anton Raphael Mengs (1752)
- Born: 1 August 1714; Penegoes, Montgomeryshire, Great Britain
- Died: 15 May 1782 (aged 67); Colomendy Hall near Llanferres, Denbighshire, Wales, Great Britain

Richard Wilson (1 August 1714 – 15 May 1782) was a Welsh painter who specialised in landscape art and worked in Britain and Italy. With George Lambert he is recognised as a pioneer in British art of landscape for its own sake and was described in the Welsh Academy Encyclopaedia of Wales as the "most distinguished painter Wales has ever produced and the first to appreciate the aesthetic possibilities of his country". In December 1768 Wilson became one of the founder-members of the Royal Academy.

== Life ==
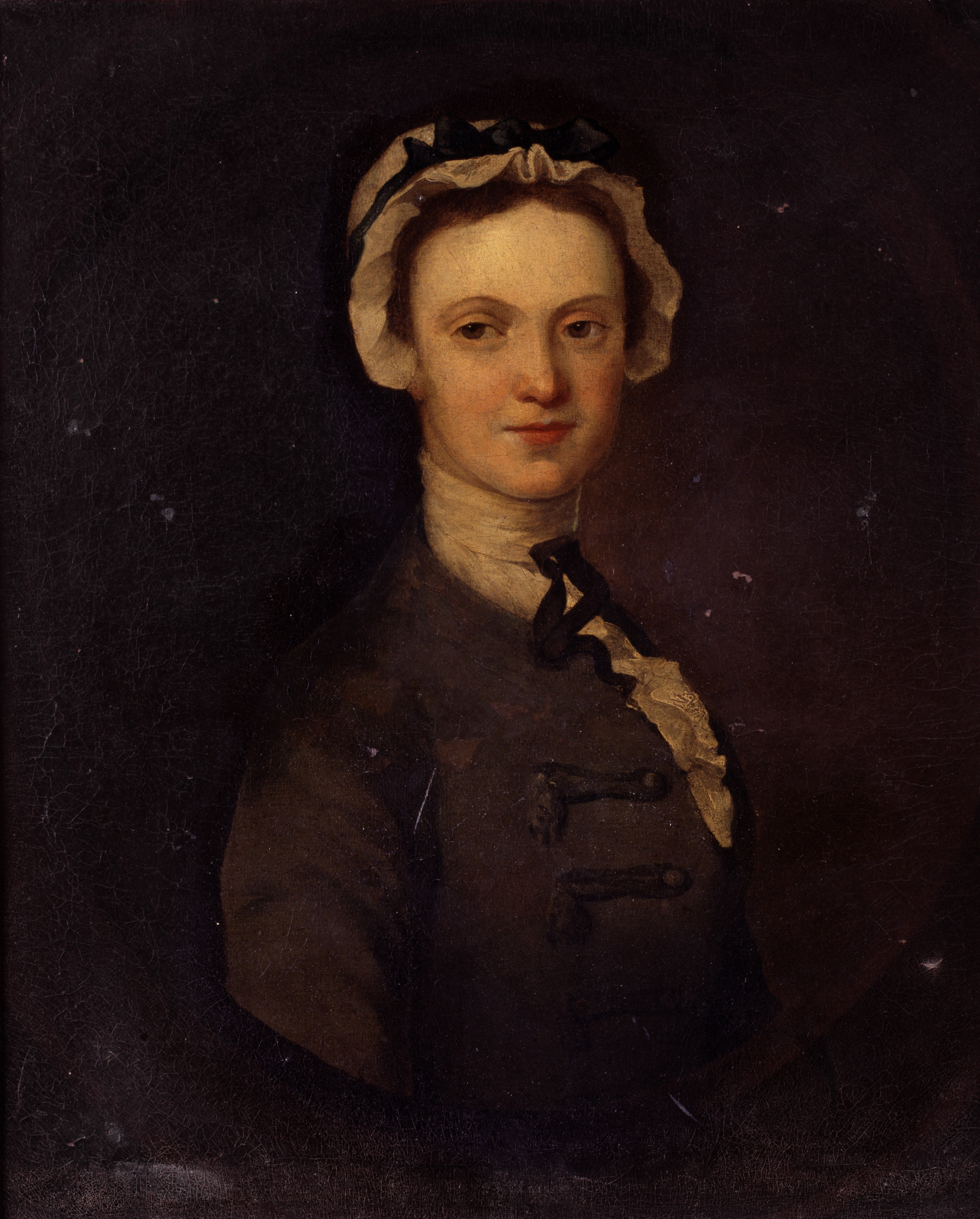
Miss Catherine Jones of Colomendy, near Mold, Wilson's cousin (c.1740)

The son of a clergyman, Richard Wilson was born on 1 August 1714, in the Welsh village of Penegoes in Montgomeryshire (now Powys). The family was an established one, and Wilson was first cousin to Charles Pratt, 1st Earl Camden. In 1729 he went to London, where he began as a portrait painter, under the apprenticeship of an obscure artist, Thomas Wright. Wilson could often be found walking around Marylebone Gardens with his acquaintance Giuseppe Marc'Antonio Baretti heading toward the 'Farthing Pie House' , now known as the Greene Man.

From 1750 to 1757 Wilson was in Italy, and became a landscape painter on the advice of Francesco Zuccarelli. Painting in Italy and afterwards in Britain, he was the first major British painter to concentrate on landscape. He composed well, but saw and rendered only the general effects of nature, thereby creating a personal, ideal style influenced by Claude Lorrain and the Dutch landscape tradition. John Ruskin wrote that Wilson "paints in a manly way, and occasionally reaches exquisite tones of colour". He concentrated on painting idealised Italianate landscapes and landscapes based upon classical literature, but when his painting, The Destruction of the Children of Niobe (c.1759–60), won acclaim, he gained many commissions from landowners seeking classical portrayals of their estates. Among Wilson's pupils was the painter Thomas Jones. His landscapes were acknowledged as an influence by Constable, John Crome and Turner.

Wilson died at Colomendy, Denbighshire on 15 May 1782, and is buried in the grounds of St Mary's Church, Mold, Flintshire.

== Works ==
In 1948, Mary Woodall, keeper of art at Birmingham Museum and Art Gallery, organised a pioneer exhibition of his work.

A catalogue raisonné of the artist's work compiled by Paul Spencer-Longhurst is published by the Paul Mellon Centre for Studies in British Art.

Extant works include:

Landscapes

- Caernarfon Castle
- The Cock Tavern at Cheam (1745)
- Dolbadarn Castle
- Dover Castle
- Lake Avernus I (c. 1765)
- Lake Avernus and the Island of Capri
- Lake Avernus with a Sarcophagus
- Lydford Waterfall, Tavistock
- River at Penegoes
- The Garden of the Villa Madama, Rome
- Valley of the Mawddach with Cader Idris
- View at Tivoli
- View in Windsor Great Park
- Cilgerran Castle
- Classical Landscape, Strada Nomentana
- Conway Castle
- Dolgellau Bridge
- Falls of Niagara
- Pistyll Rhaeadr, Aber Falls
- Solitude (or Landskip with Hermits)

Other

- Ceyx and Alcyone (1768)
- Francis Ayscough, Dean of Bristol and tutor to King George III of Great Britain with his pupils
- Miss Catherine Jones of Colomendy, near Mold (1740)

=== Gallery ===
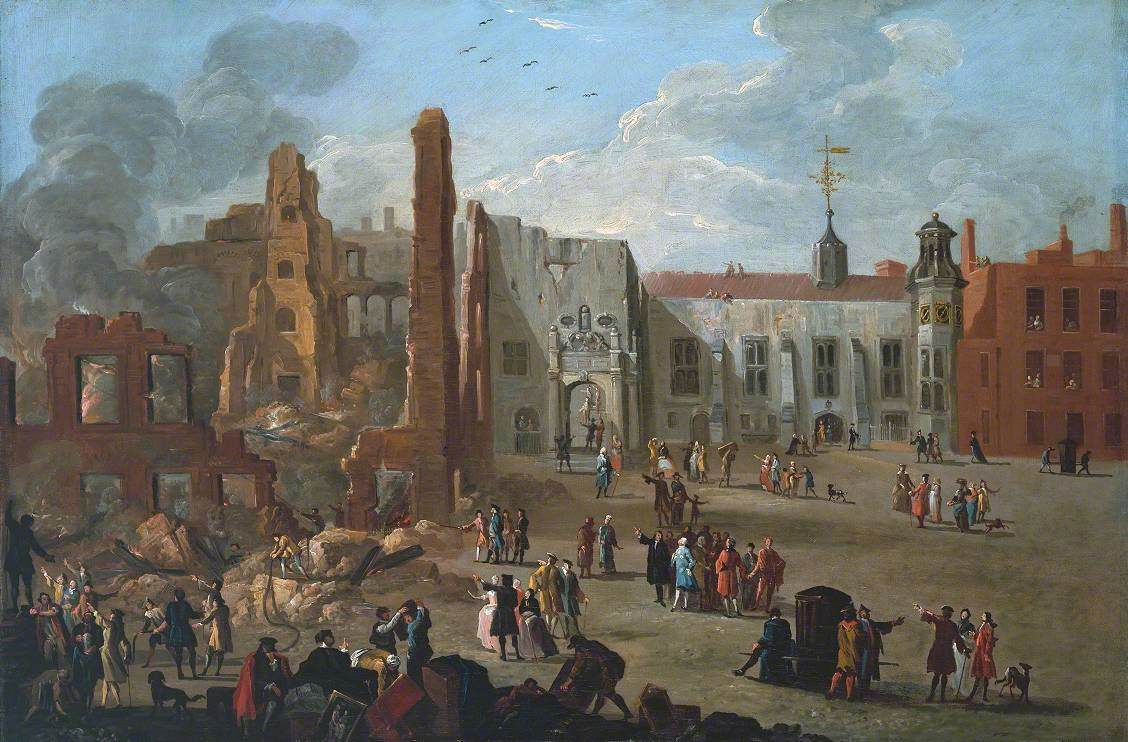
The Inner Temple after the Fire of 4 January 1737 (1737)

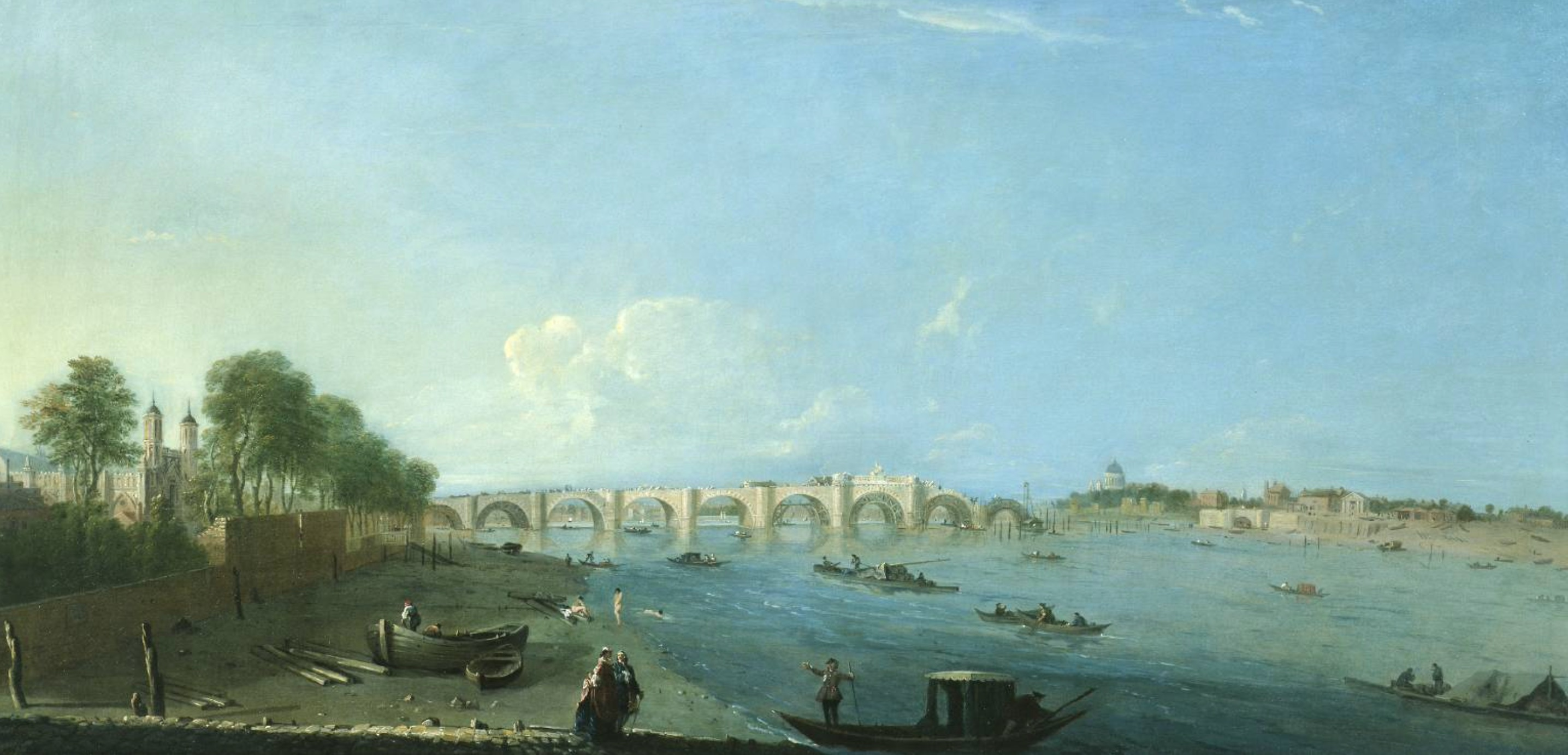
Westminster Bridge under Construction (1744)

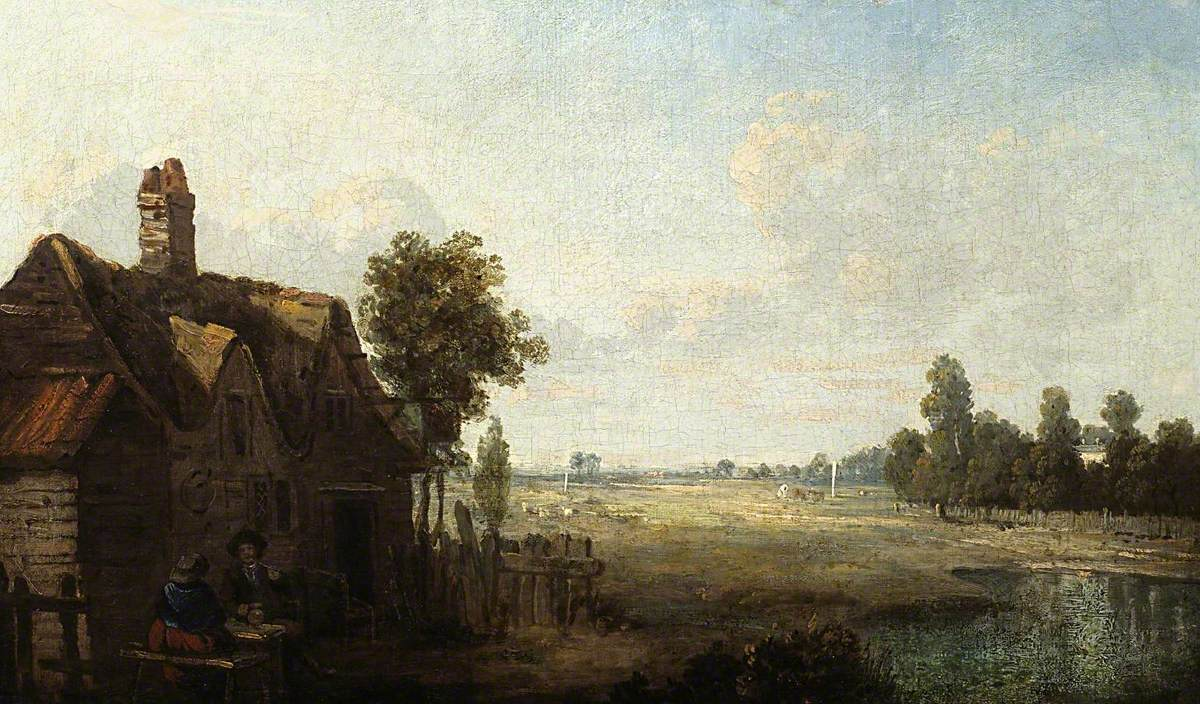
The Cock Tavern at Cheam (1745), Tate Britain

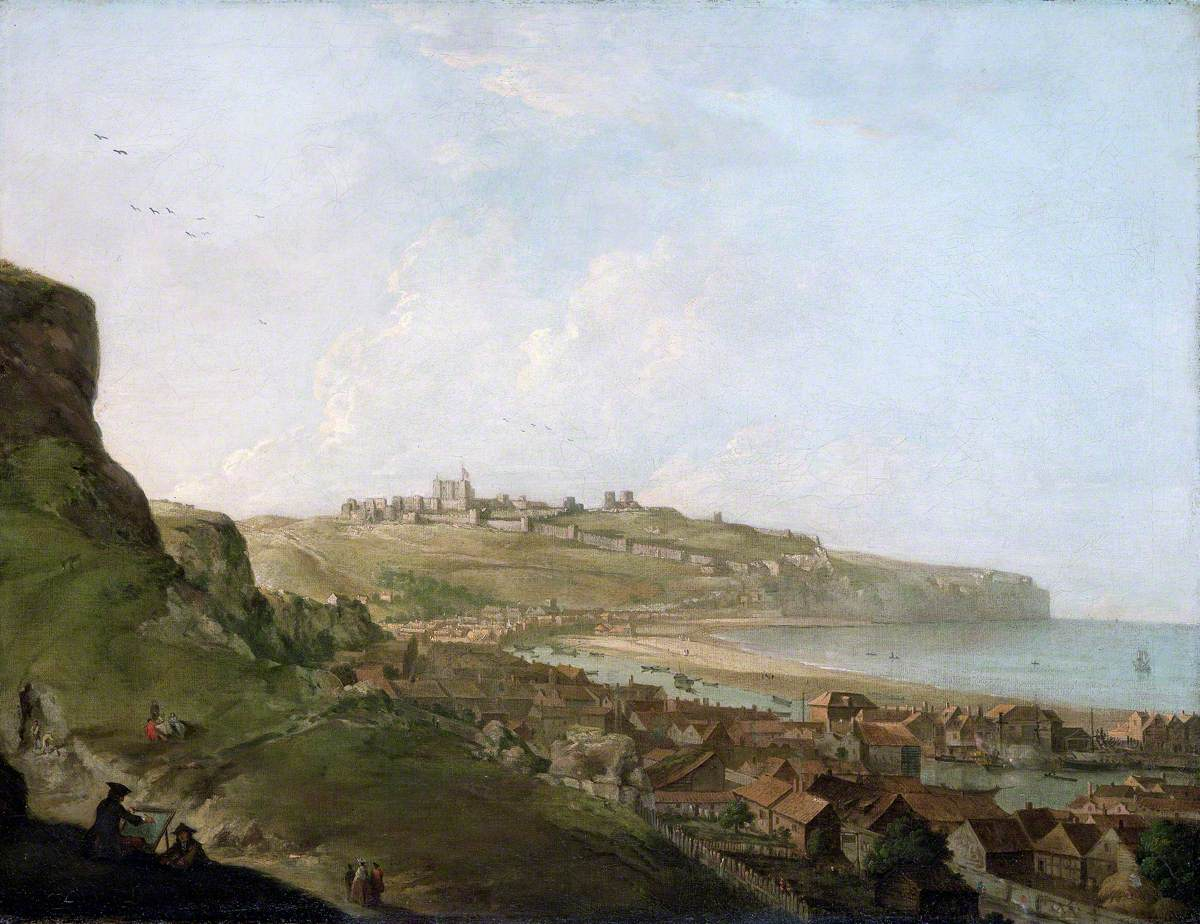
Dover Castle (1747), National Museum Cardiff

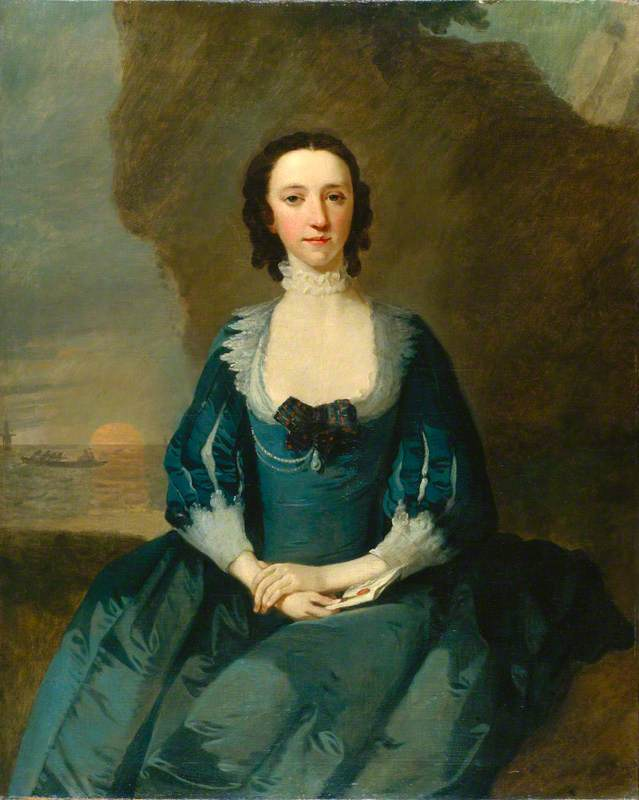
Portrait of Flora MacDonald (1747), National Portrait Gallery London

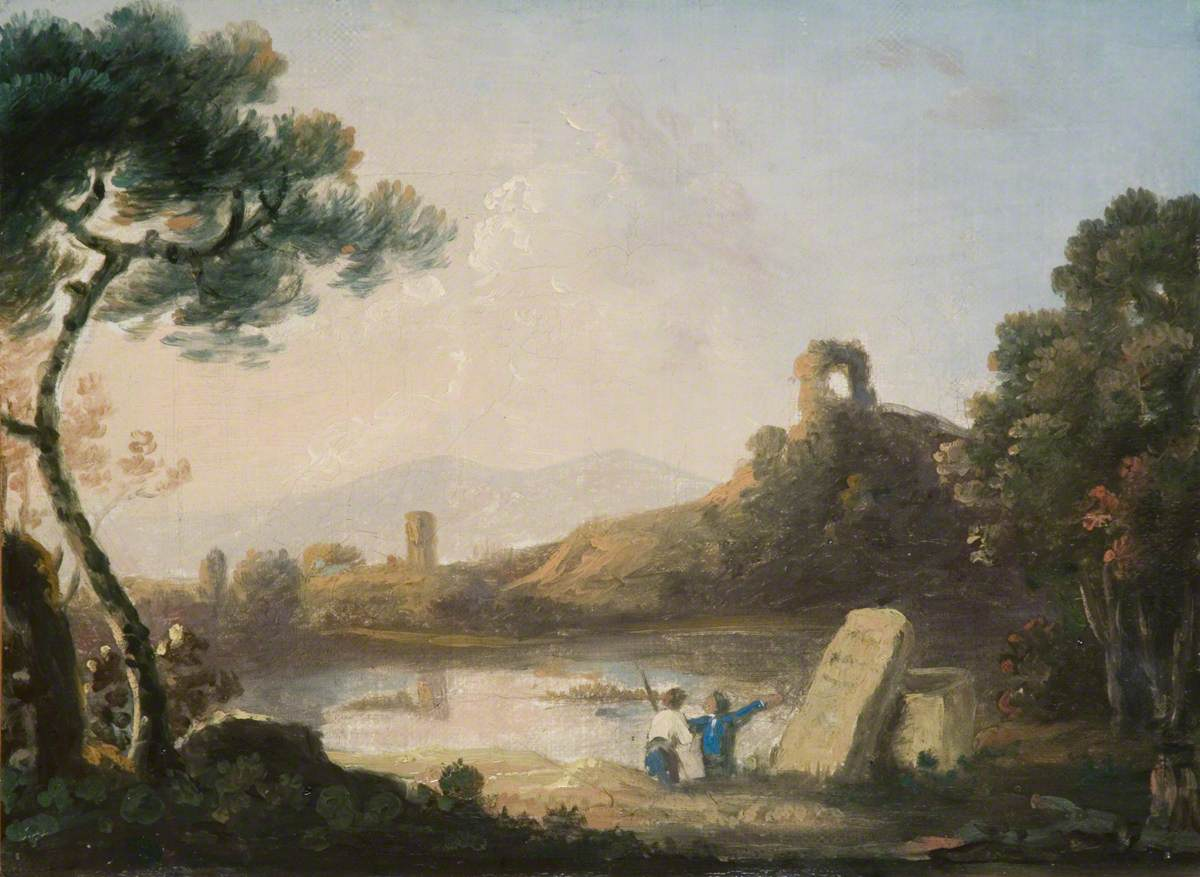
Lake Avernus with a Sarcophagus (c. 1750), National Museum Cardiff

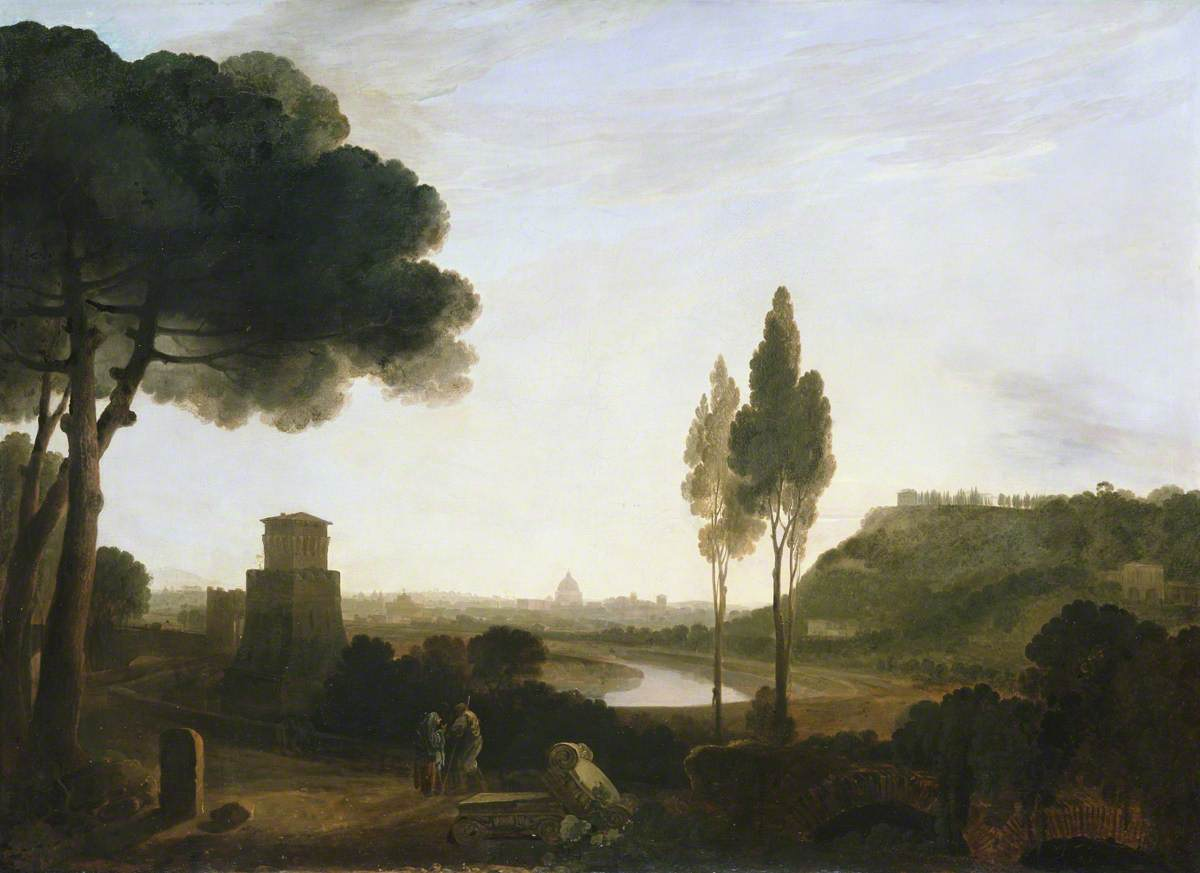
Rome from the Ponte Molle (1754), National Museum Cardiff

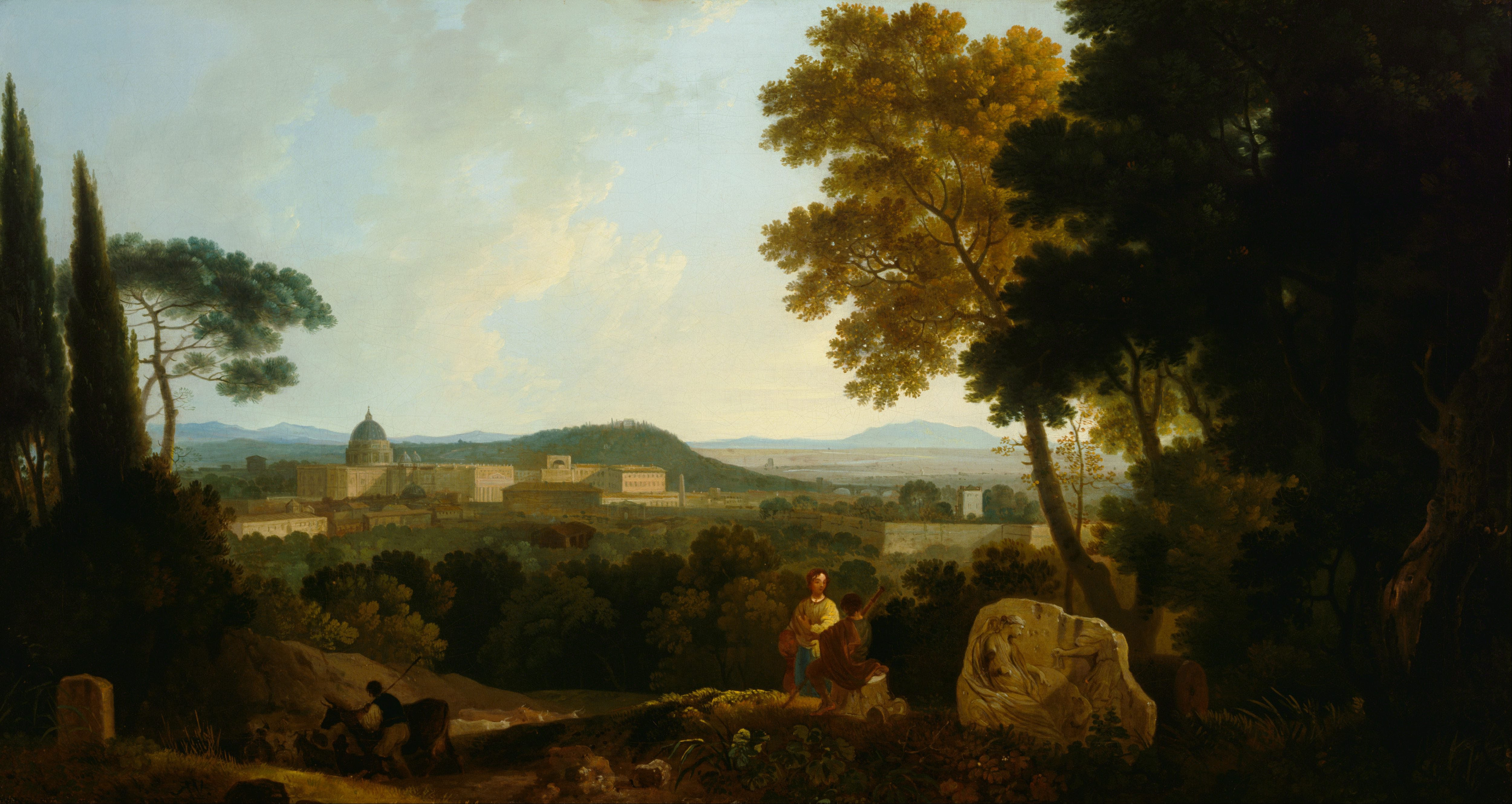
St Peters and the Vatican from the Janiculum, Rome (1757)

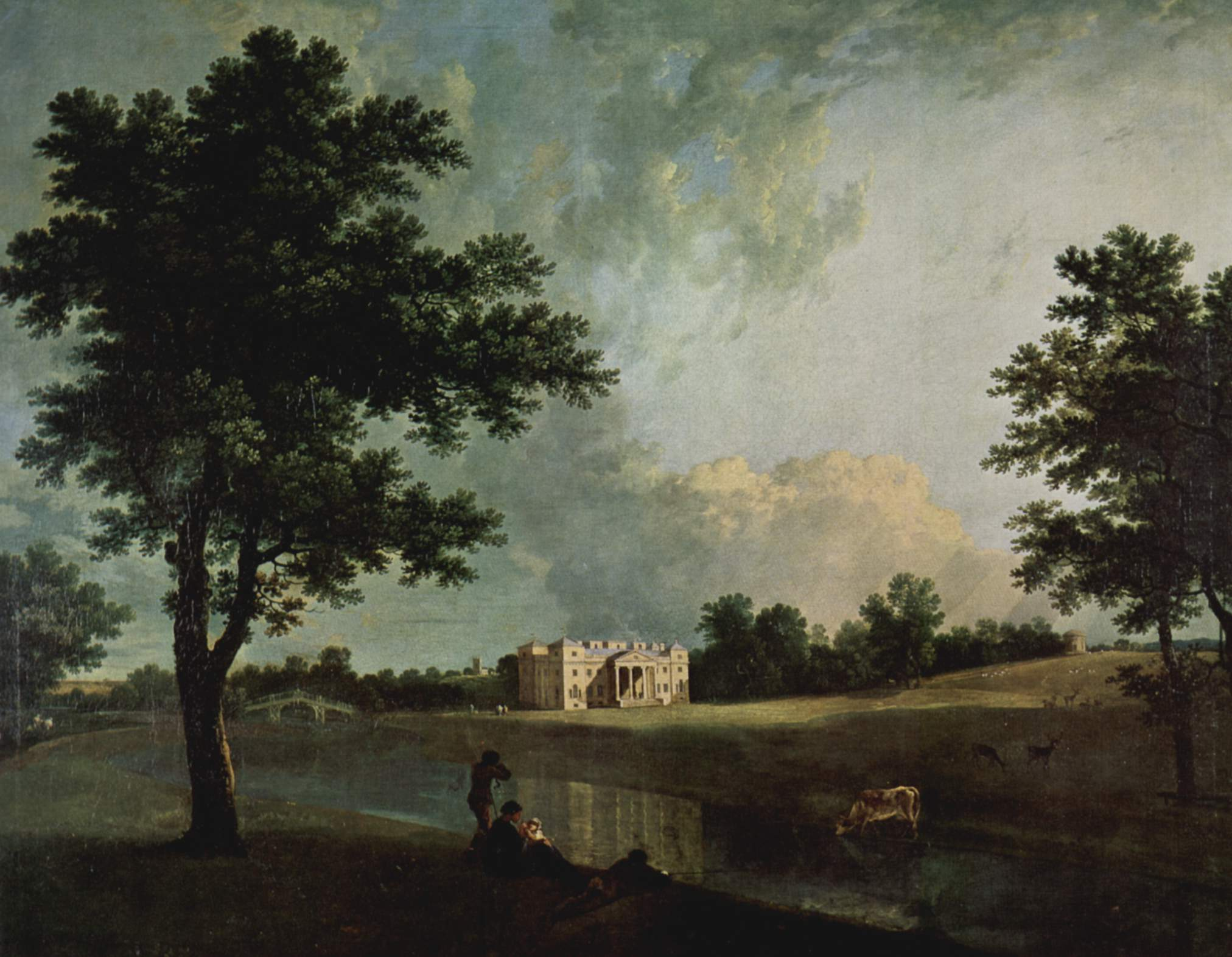
Croome Court, Worcestershire (1758)

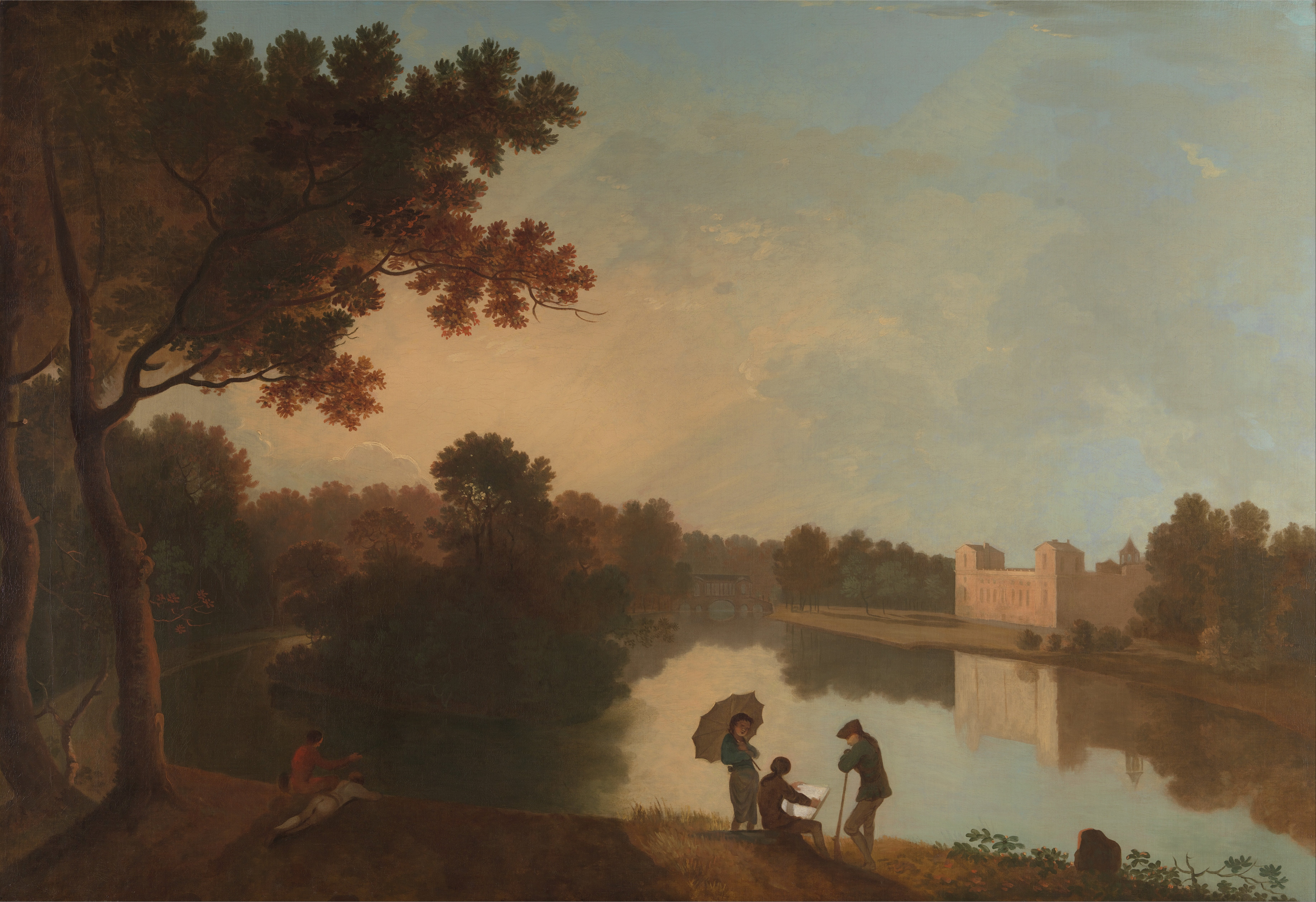
Wilton House from the Southeast (1759)

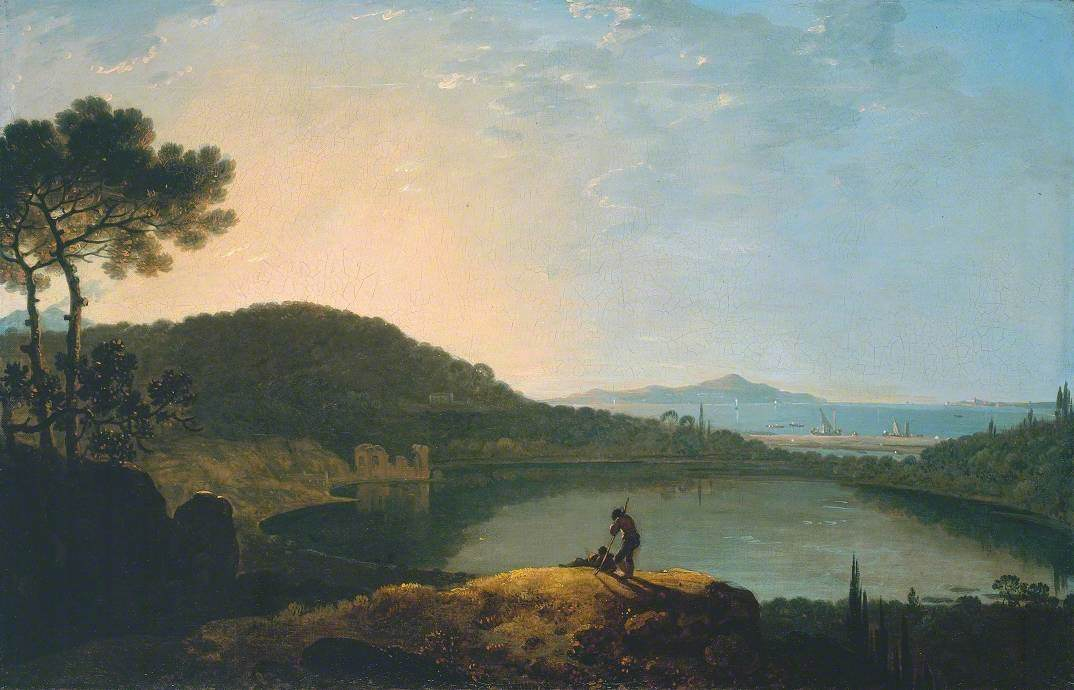
Lake Avernus and the Island of Capri (1760), Tate Britain

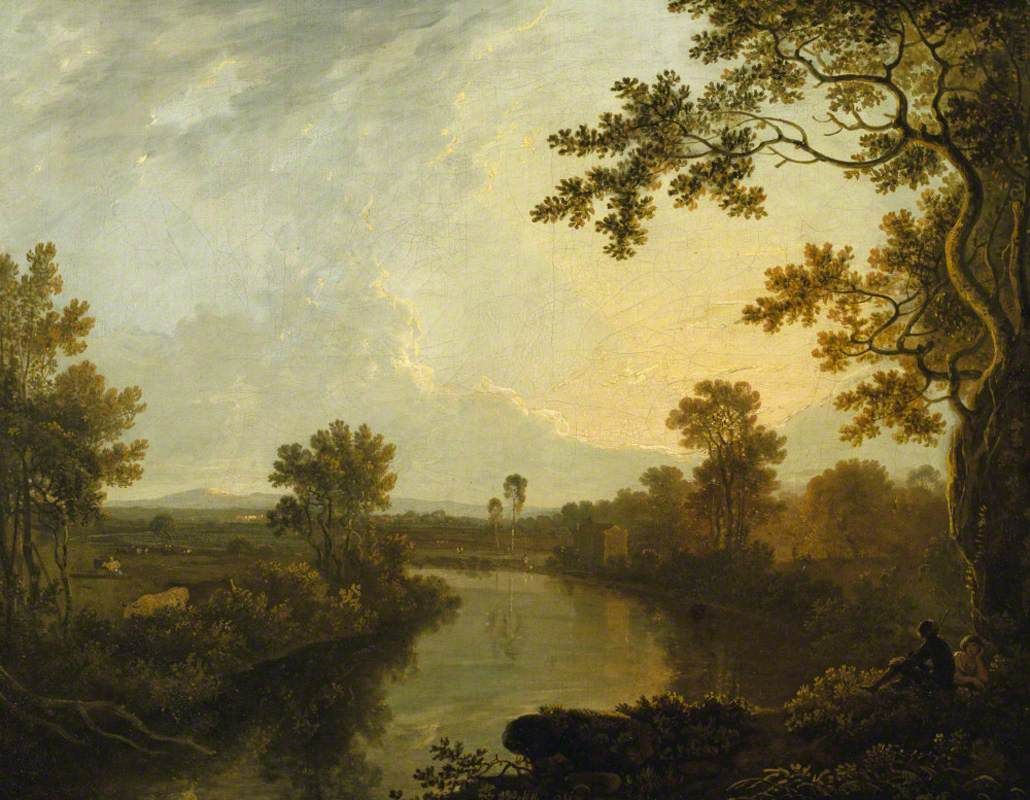
View on the River Dee (1760), National Trust UK

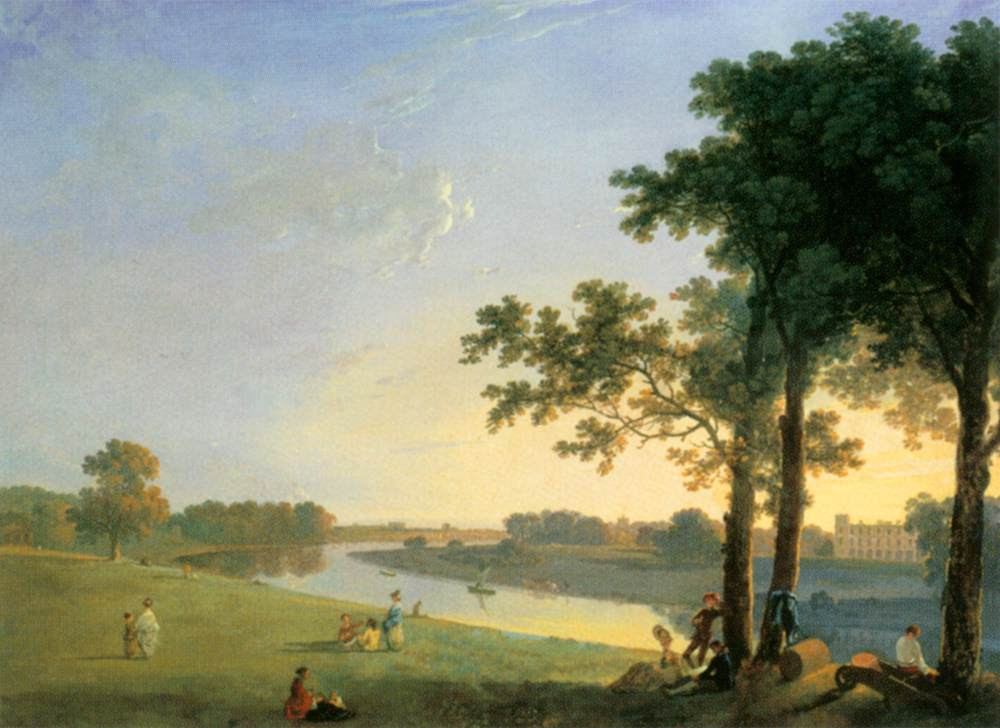
Syon House from Richmond Gardens (1761)

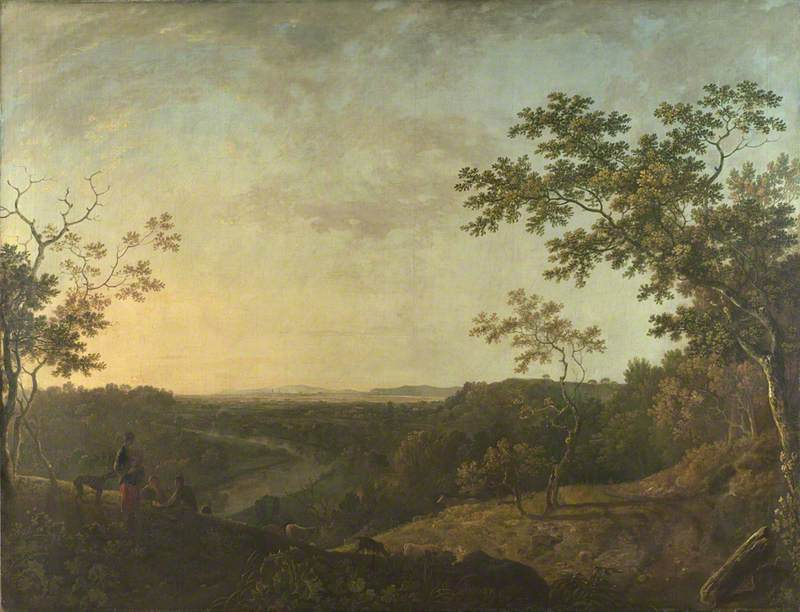
The Valley of the Dee, with Chester in the Distance (1761), National Gallery London

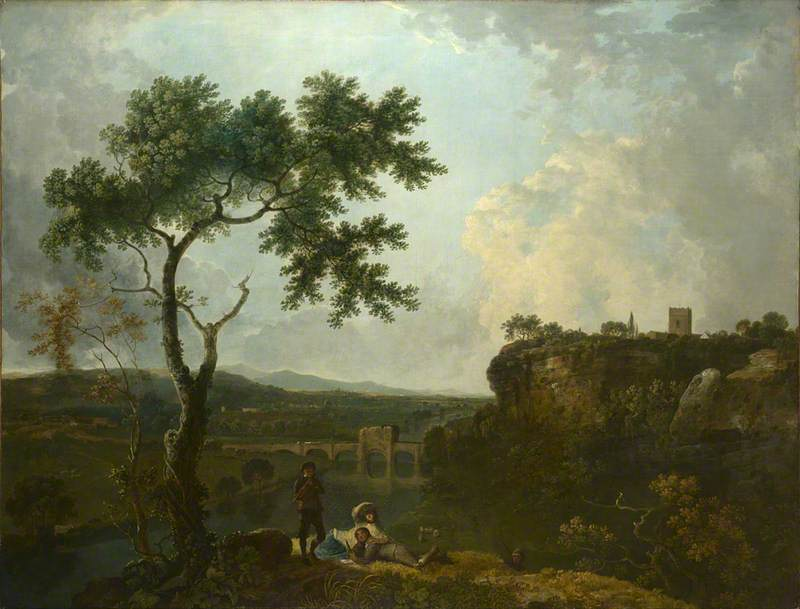
Holt Bridge on the River Dee (1761)

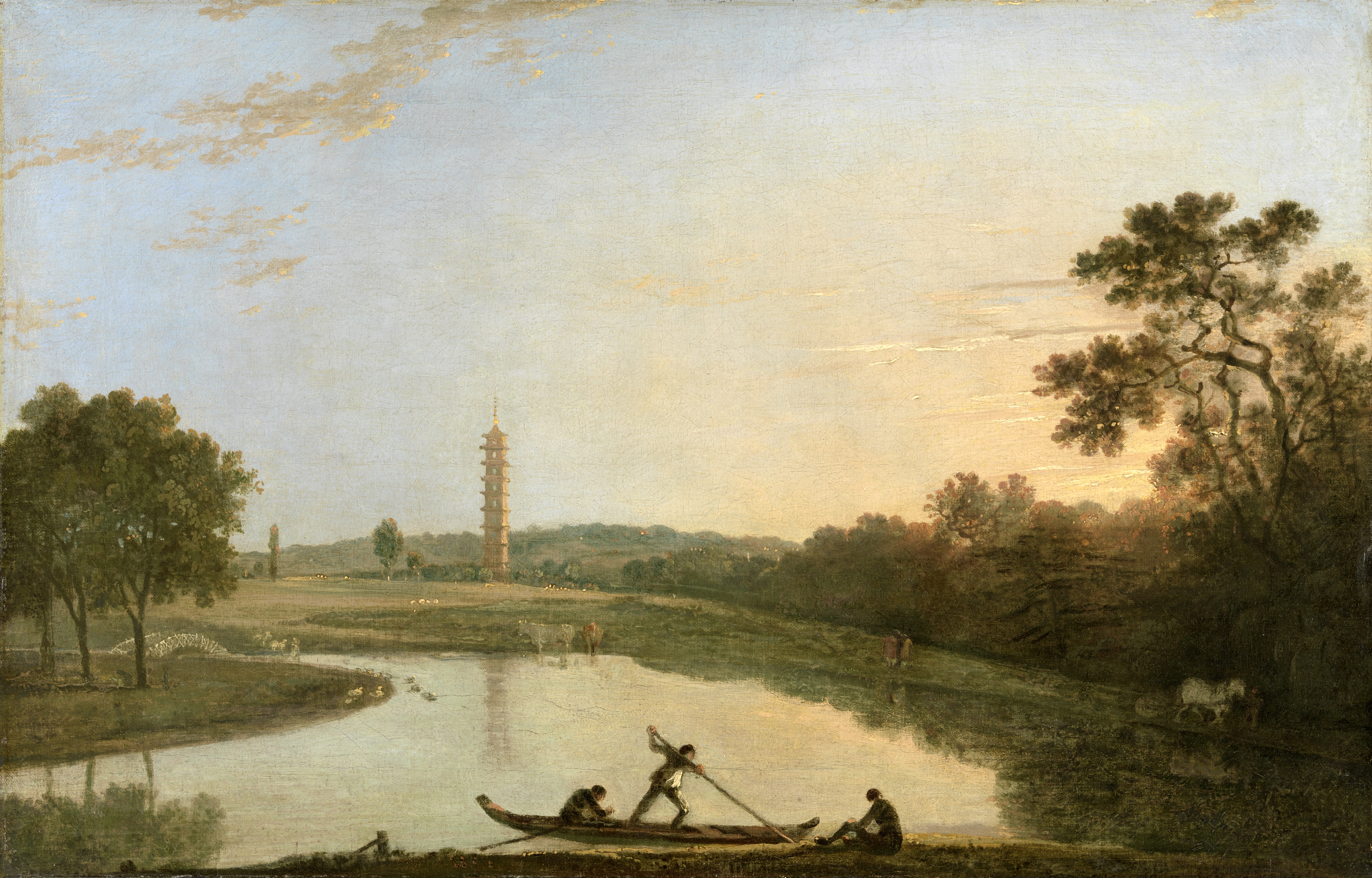
Kew Gardens: The Pagoda and Bridge (1762)

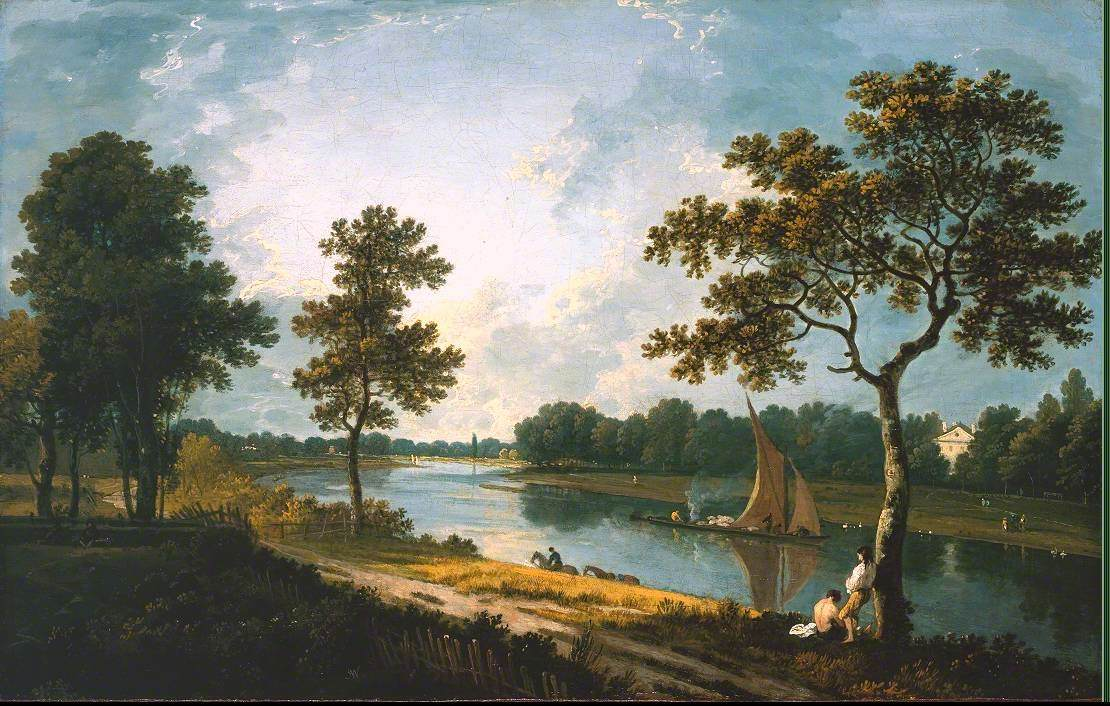
The Thames near Marble Hill, Twickenham (1762), Tate Britain

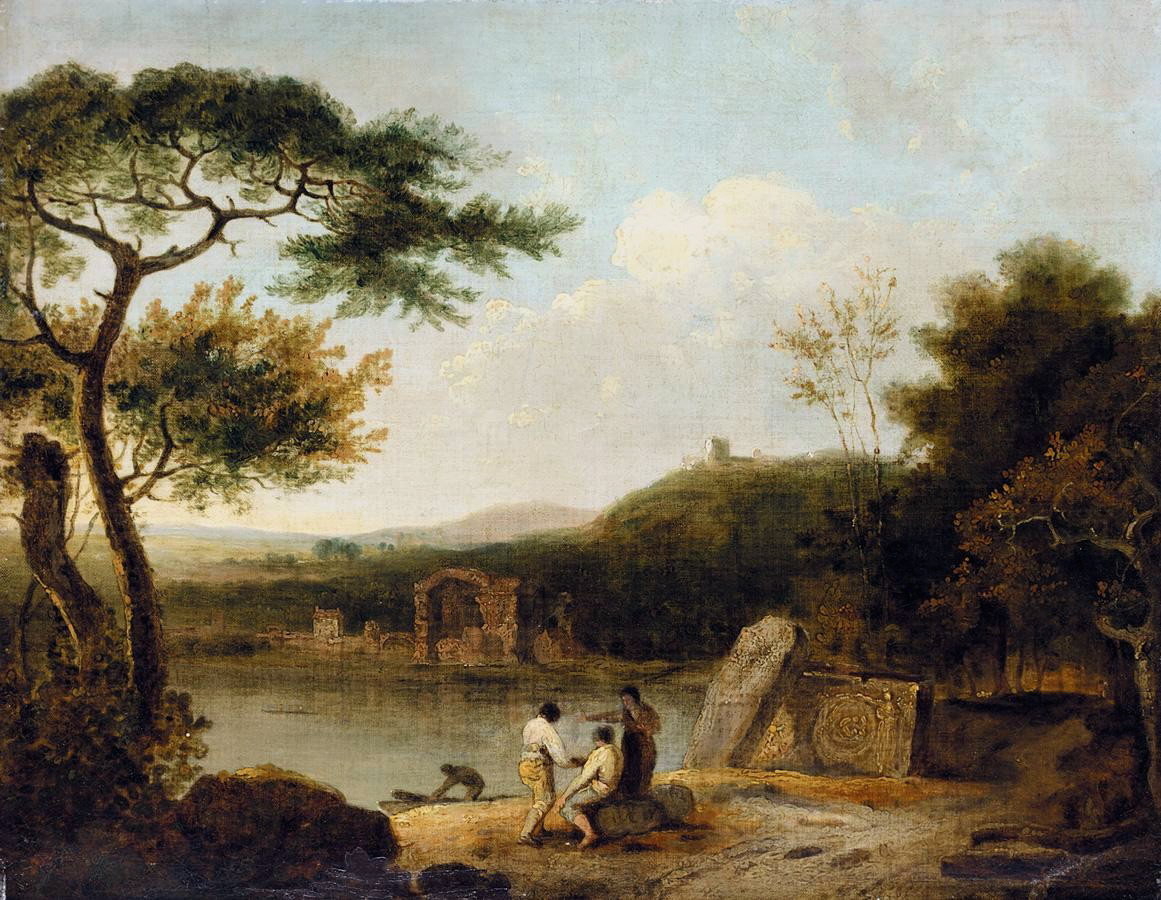
Lake Avernus I (c. 1765), National Gallery of Victoria

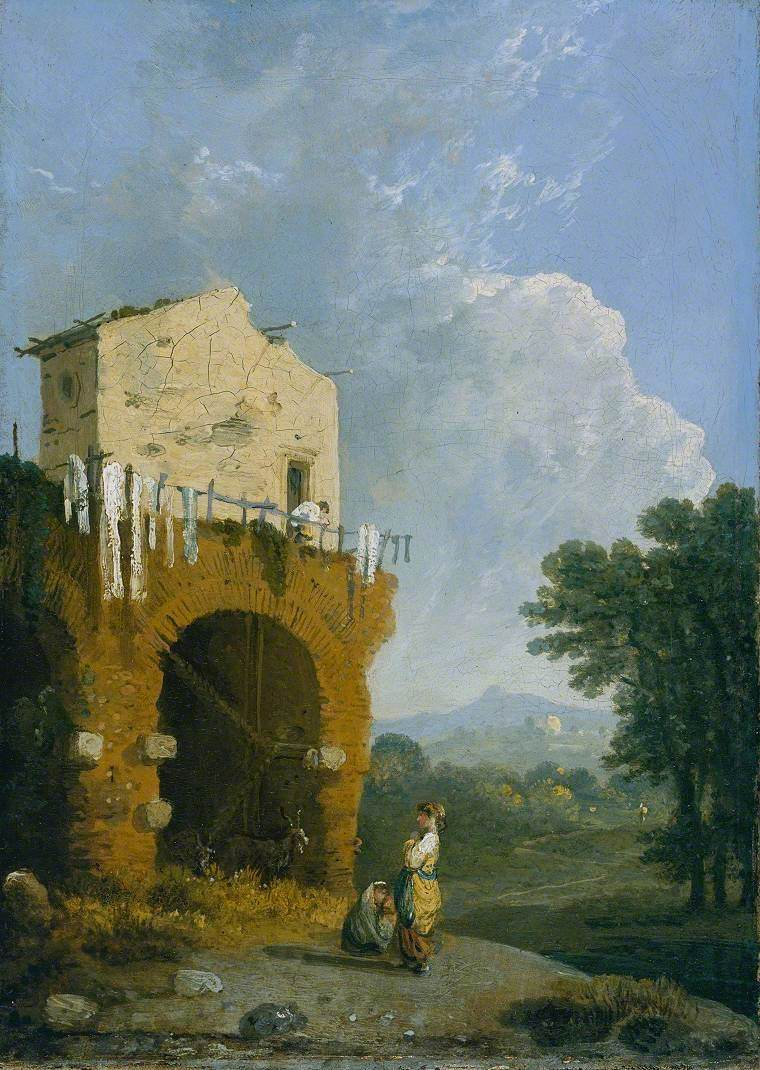
Hadrian's Villa (1765)

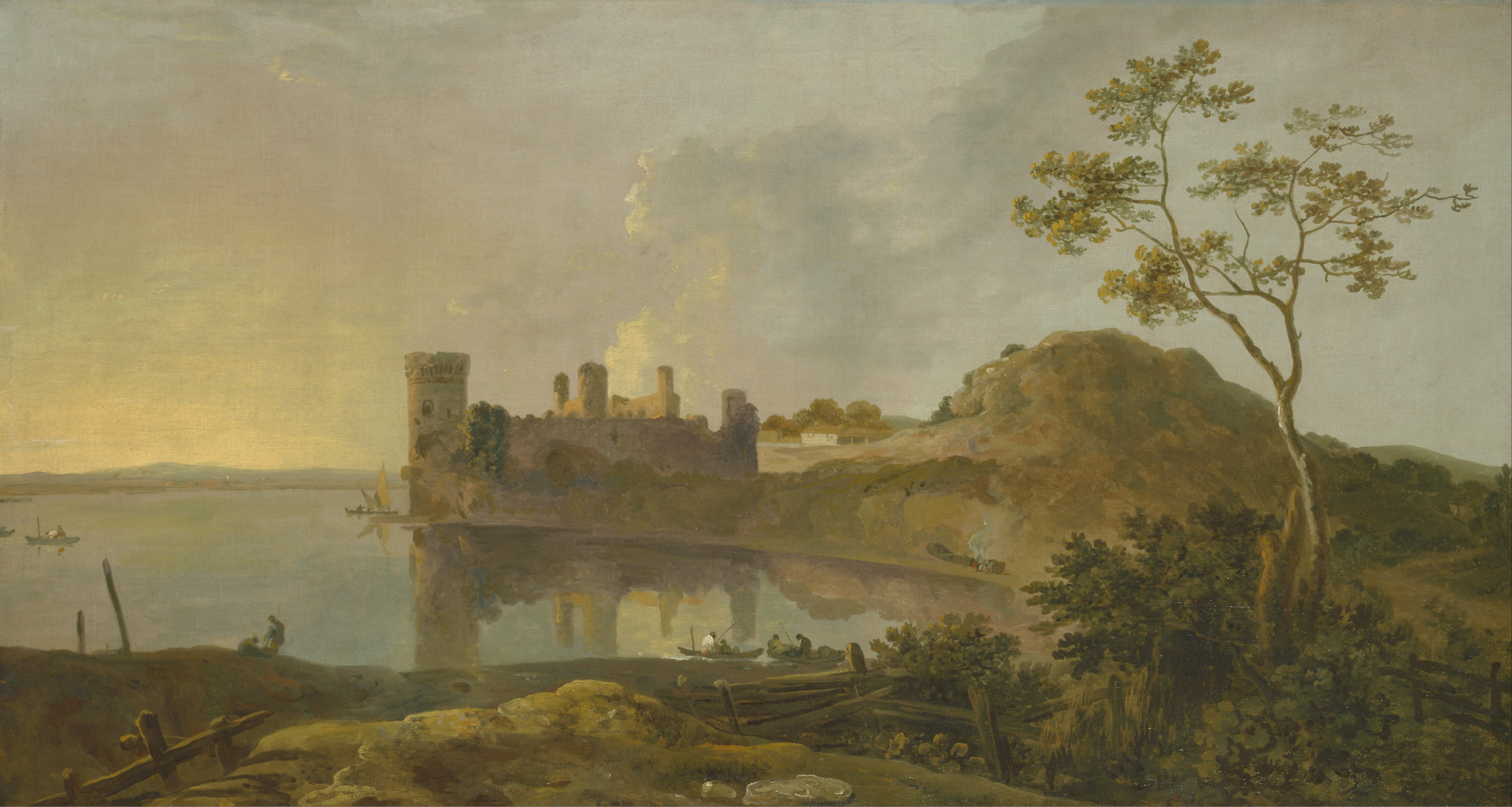
Caernarvon Castle (1765)

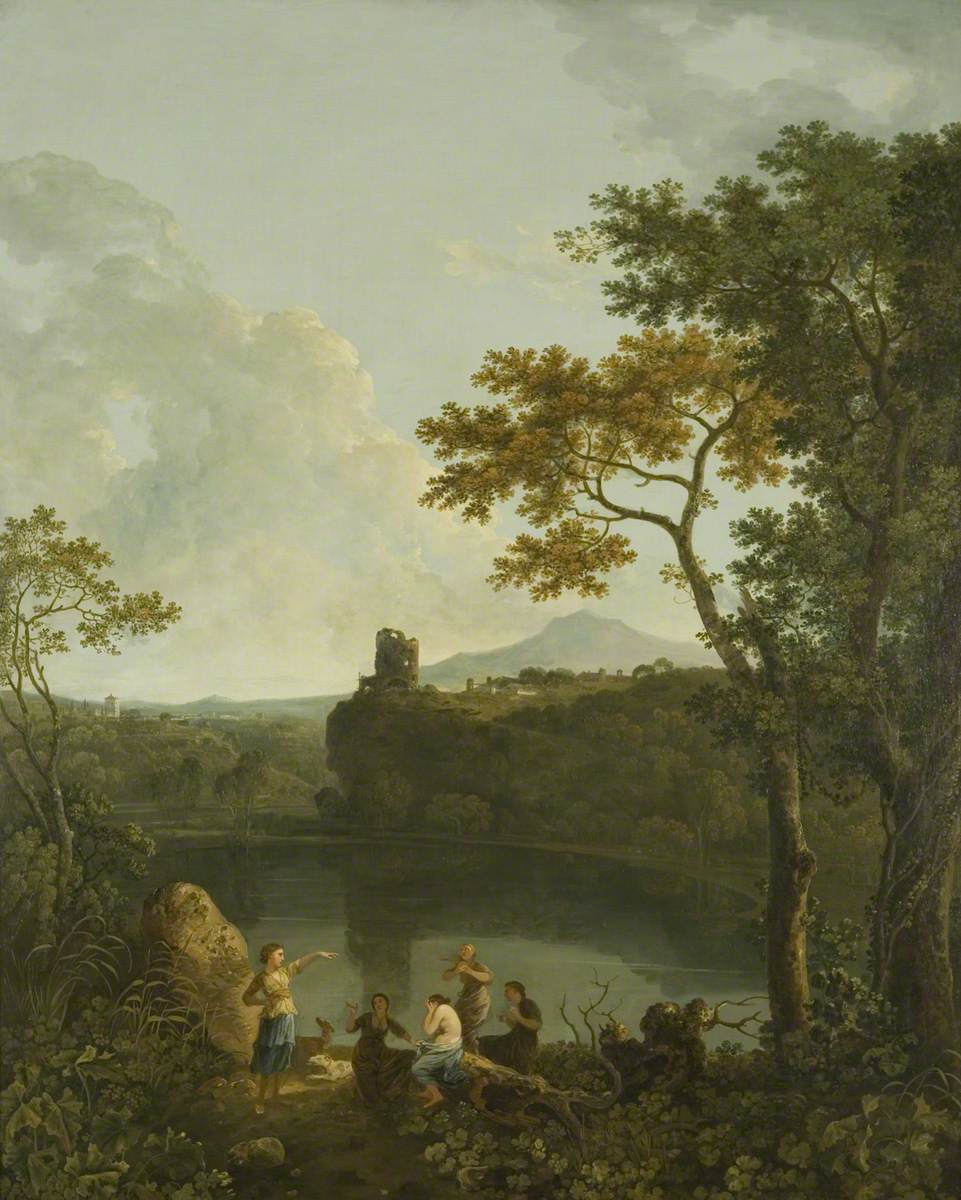
Diana and Callisto (1765)

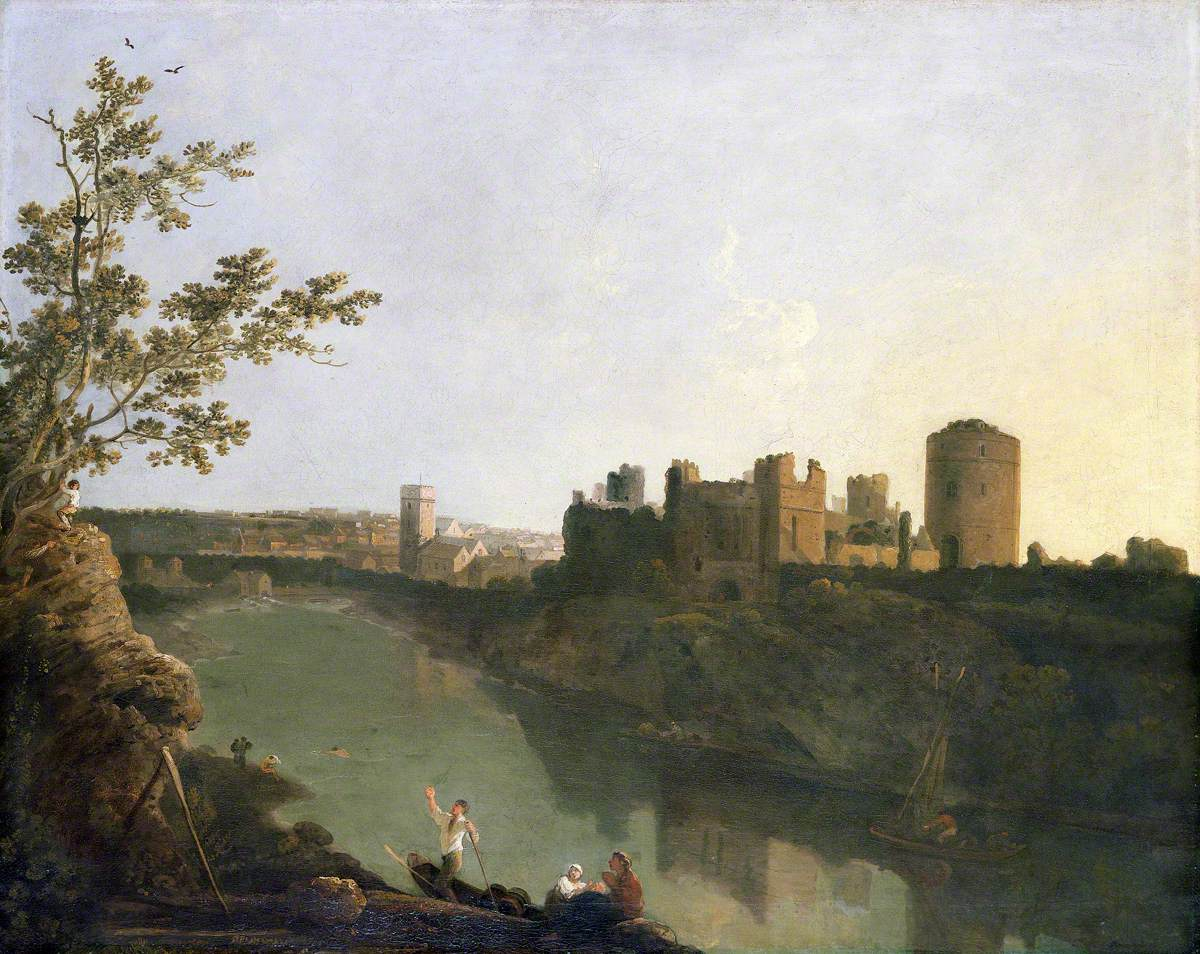
Pembroke Town and Castle (1765), National Museum Cardiff

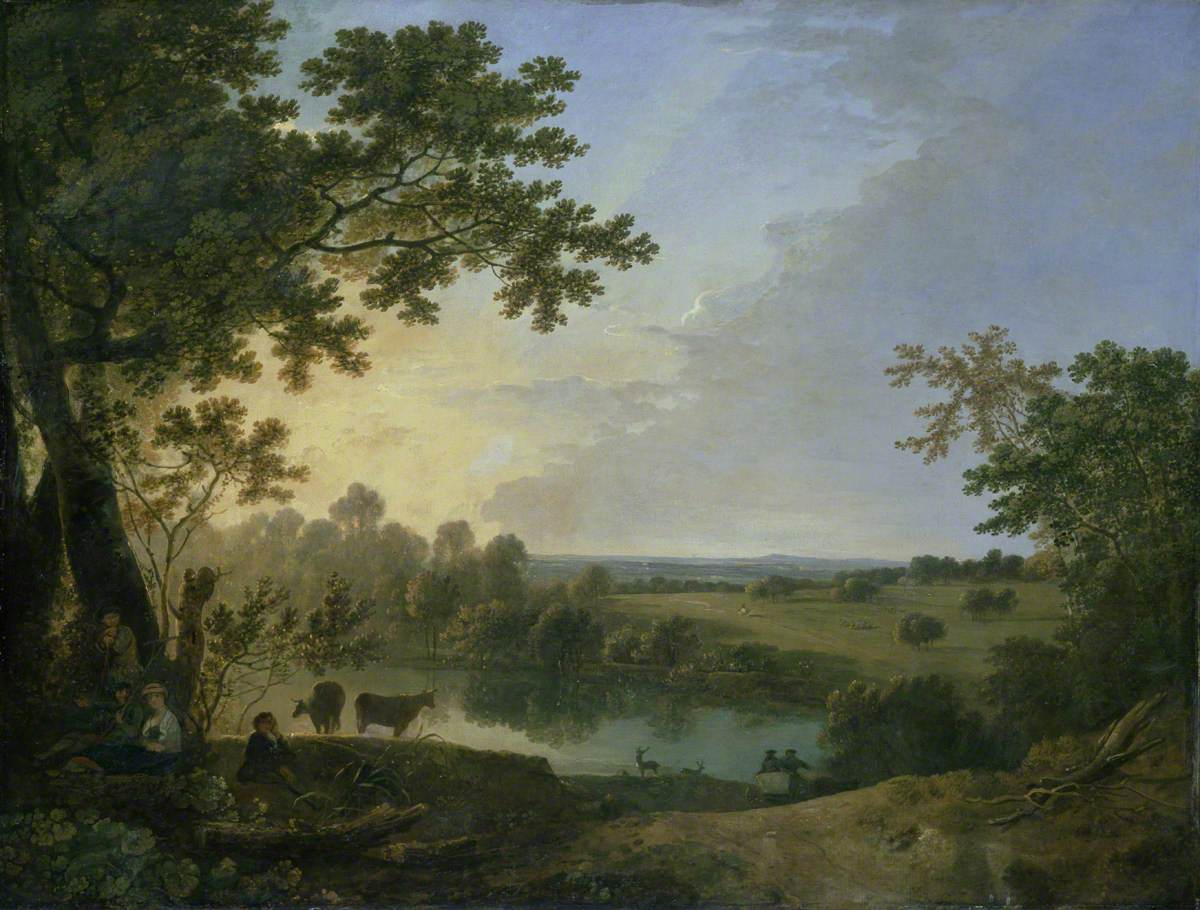
View in Windsor Great Park (1765), National Museum Cardiff

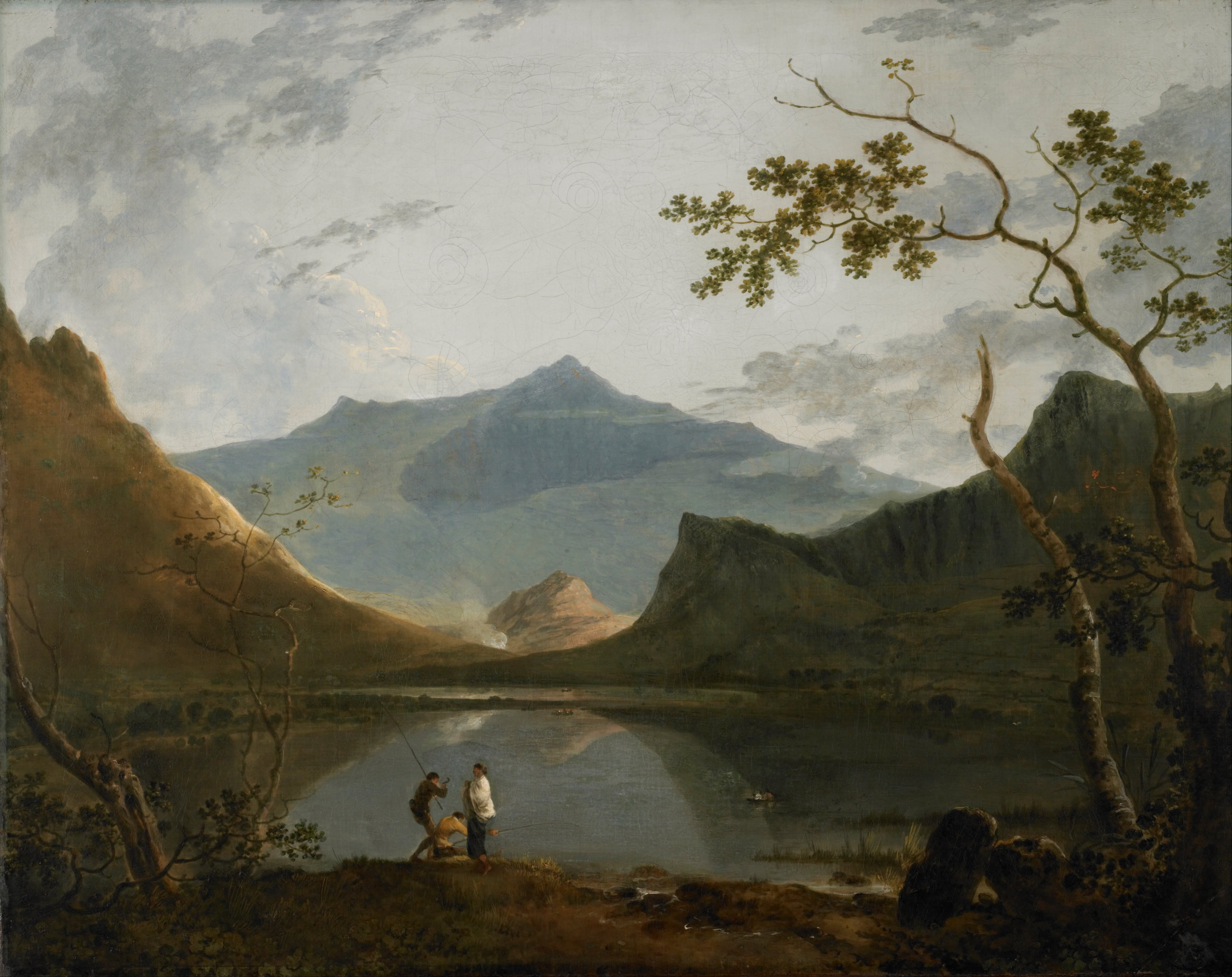
Snowdon from Llyn Nantlle (1766)

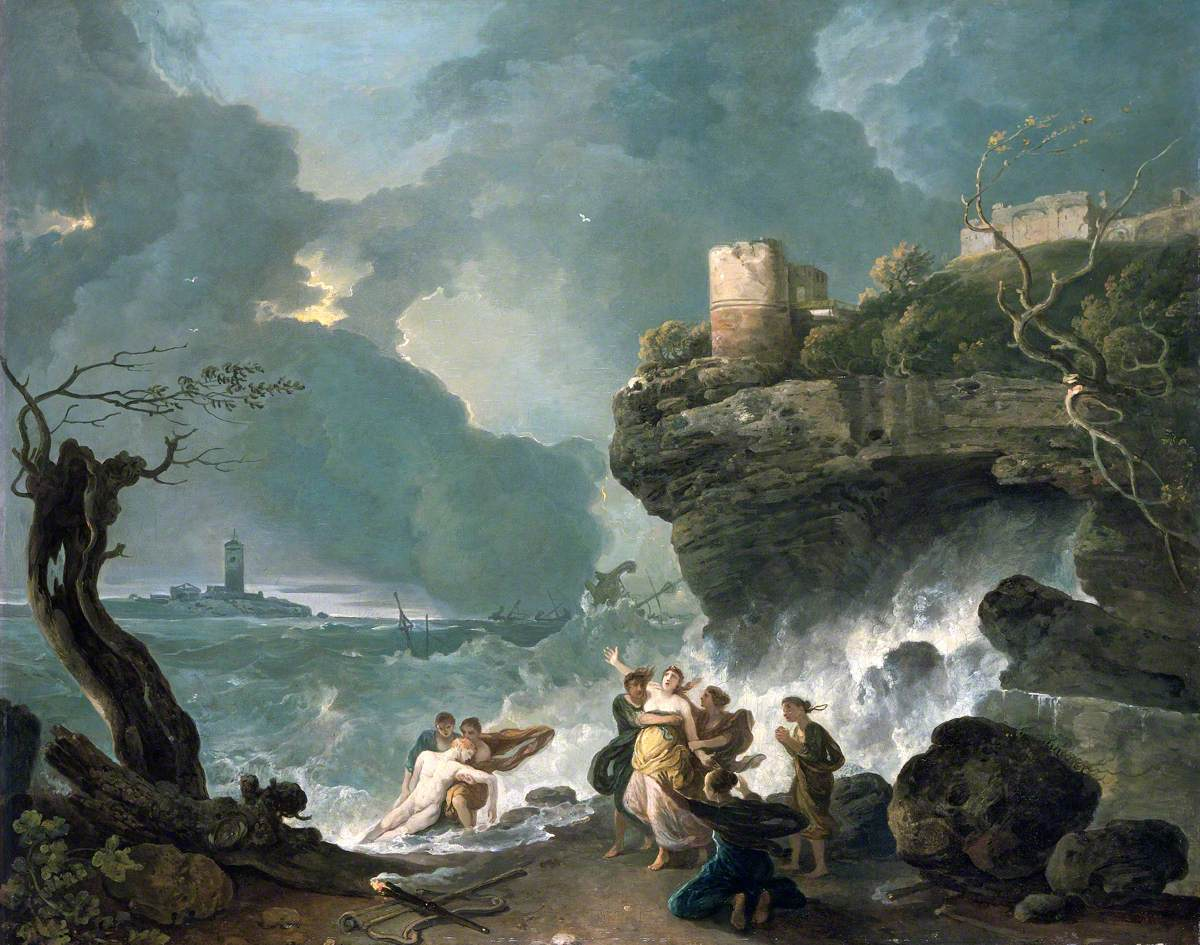
Ceyx and Alcyone (1768), National Museum Cardiff

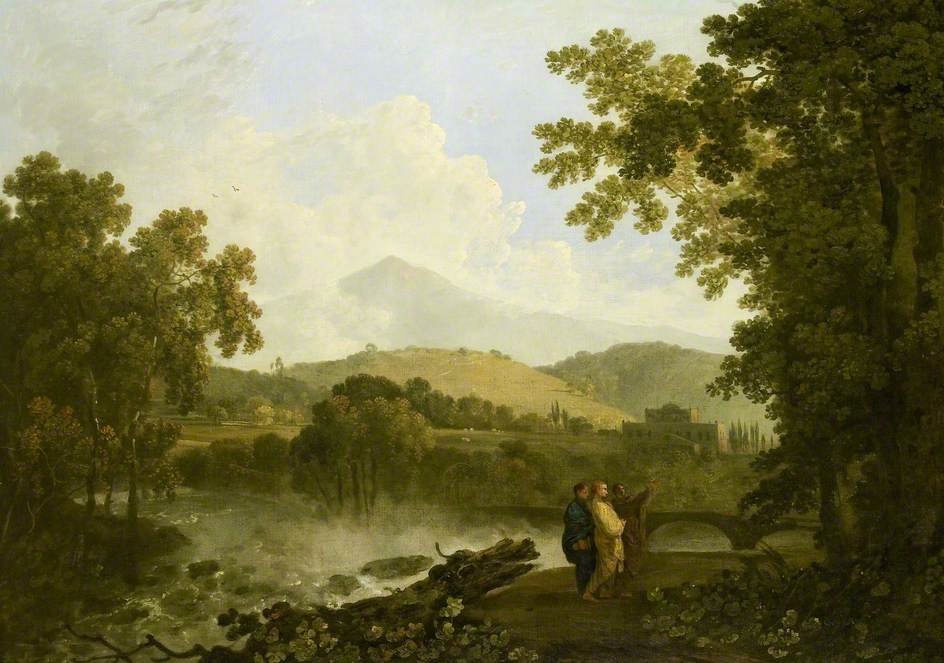
Cicero and his two Friends, Atticus and Quintus, at his Villa at Arpinum (1769-70), Ashmolean Museum

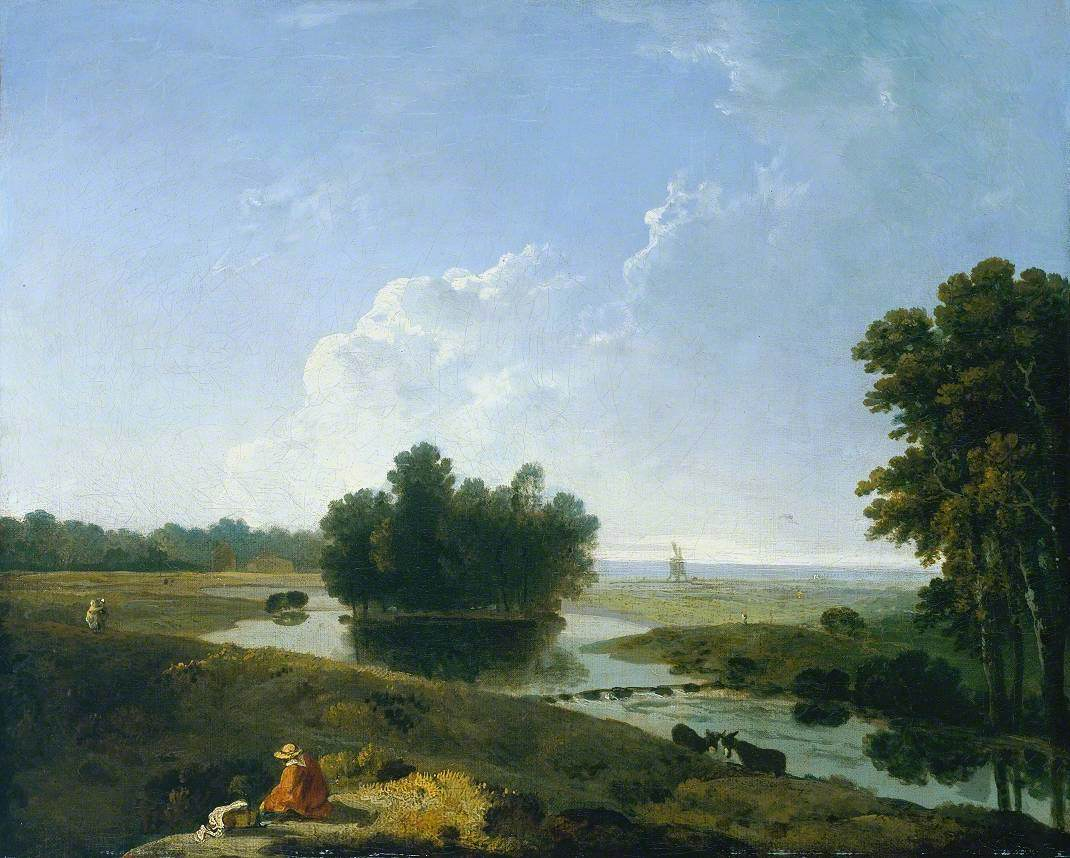
On Hounslow Heath (1770)

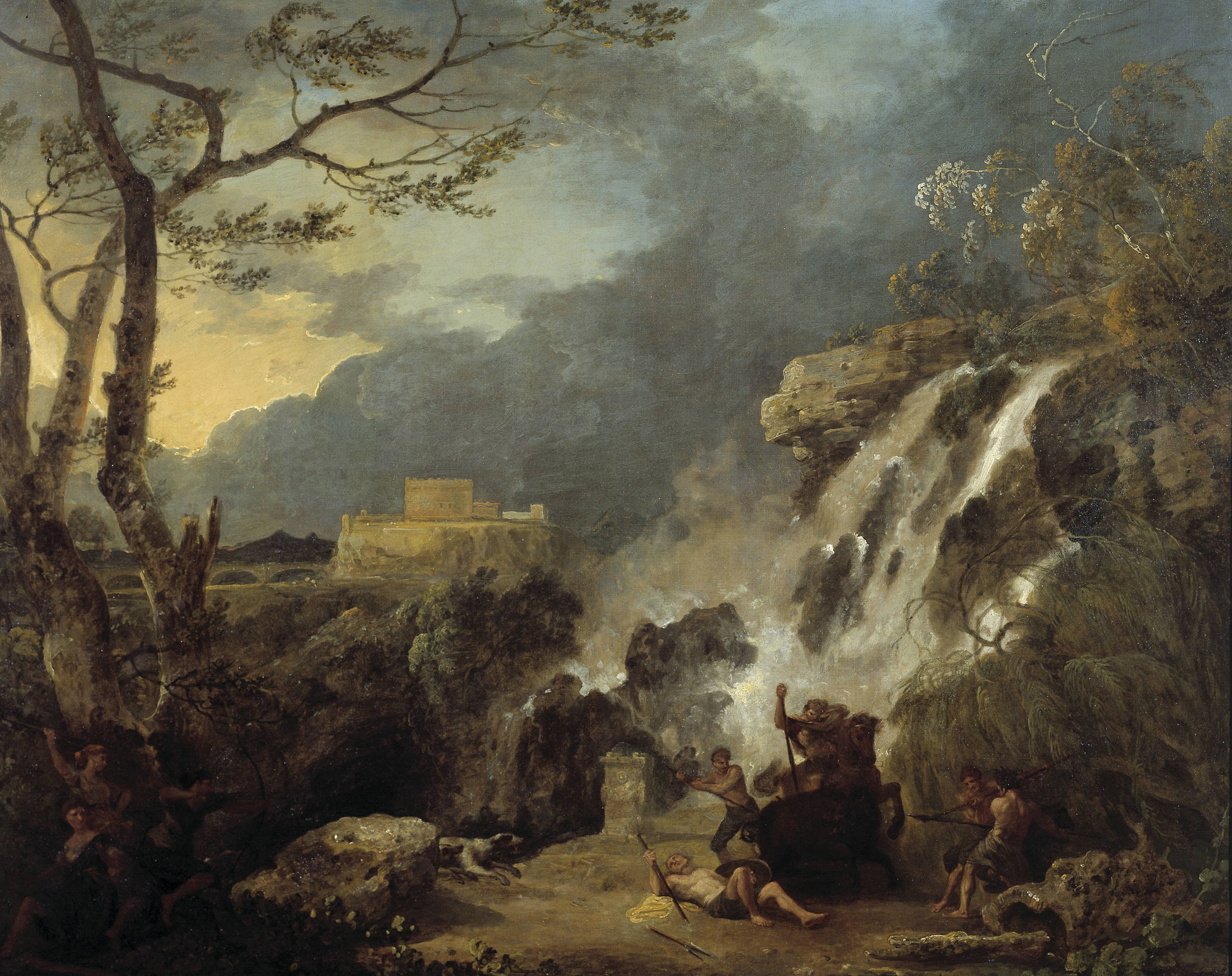
Meleager and Atalanta (1770)

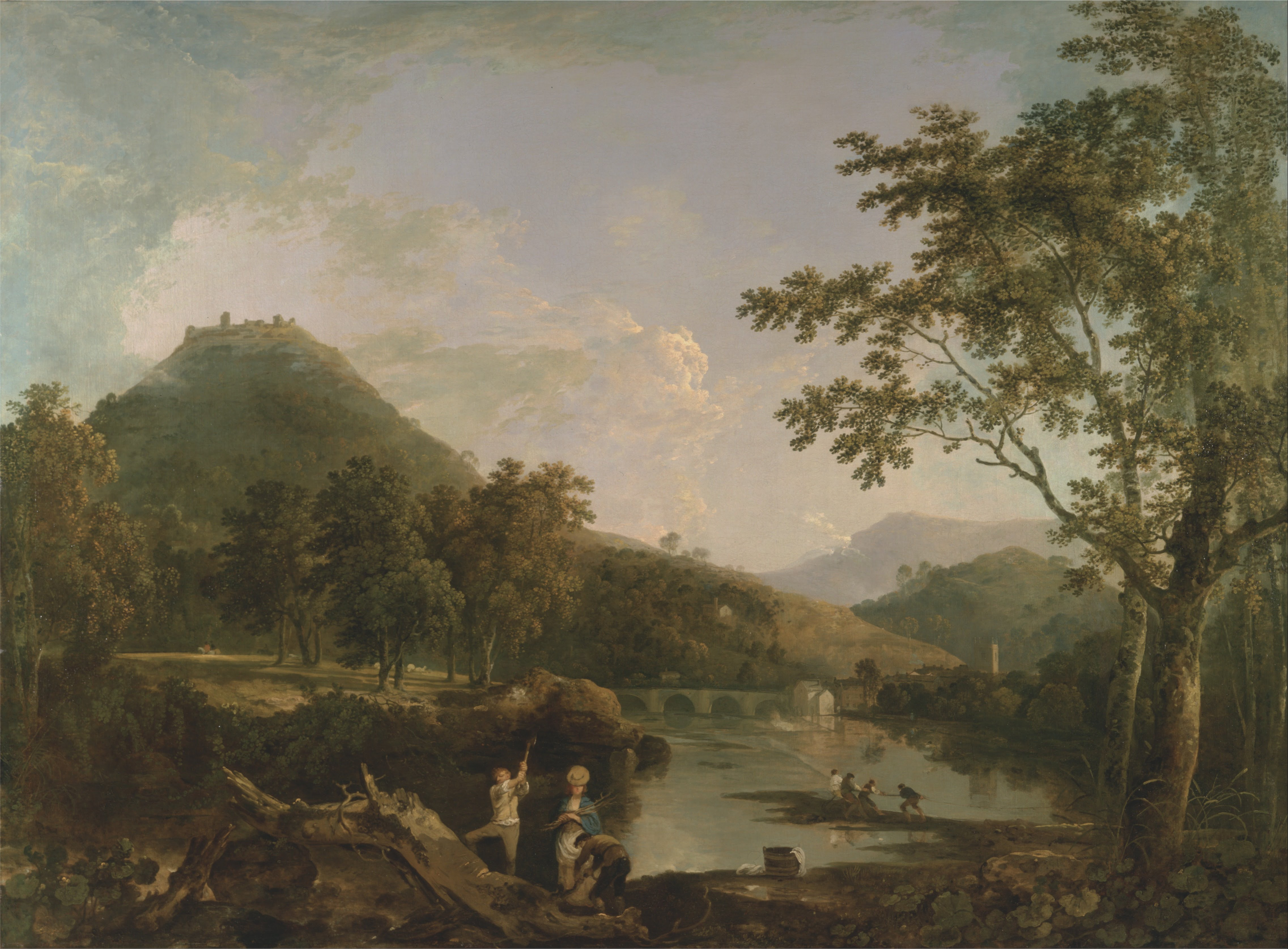
Dinas Bran from Llangollen (1771)

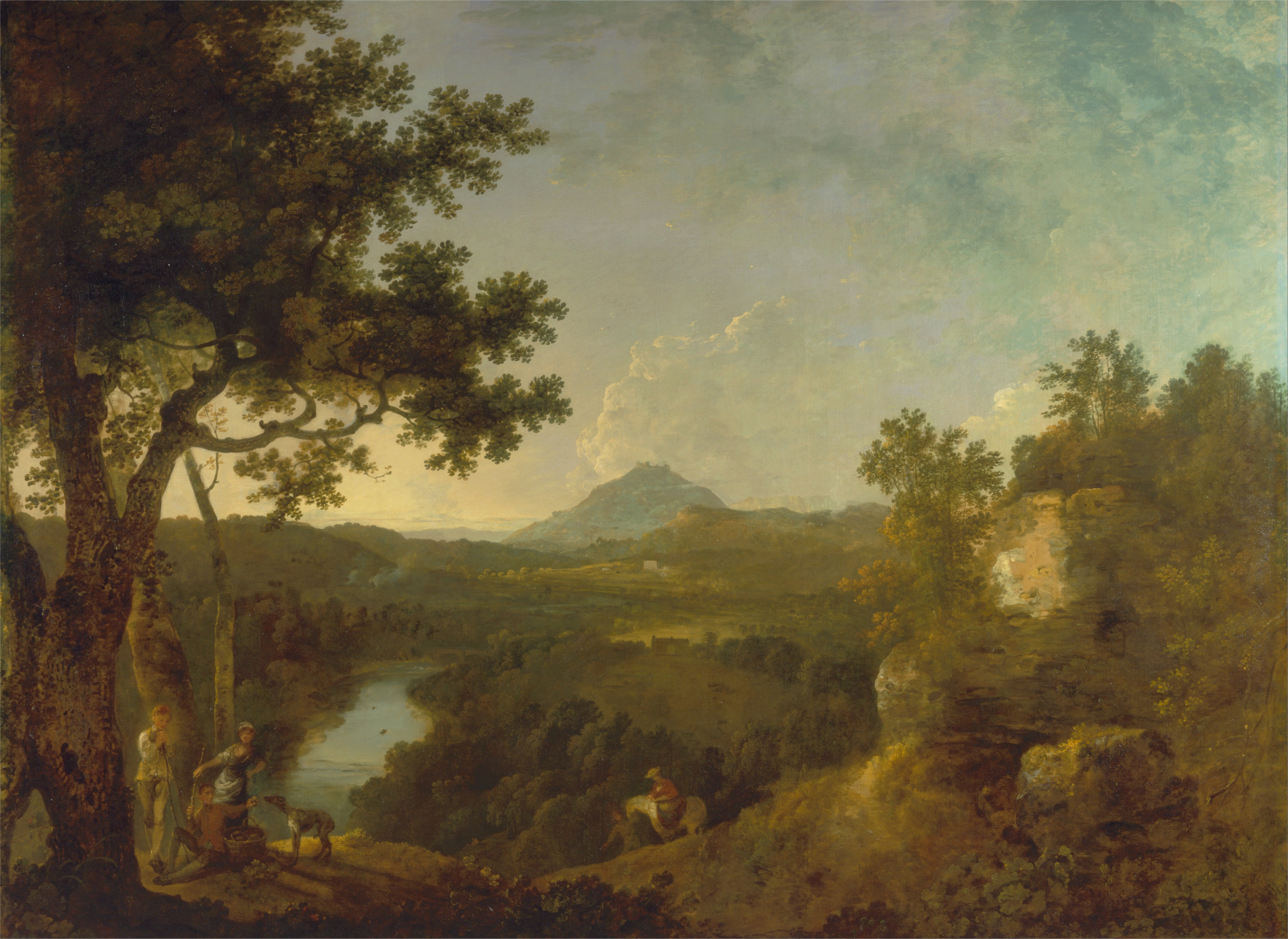
View near Wynnstay (1771)

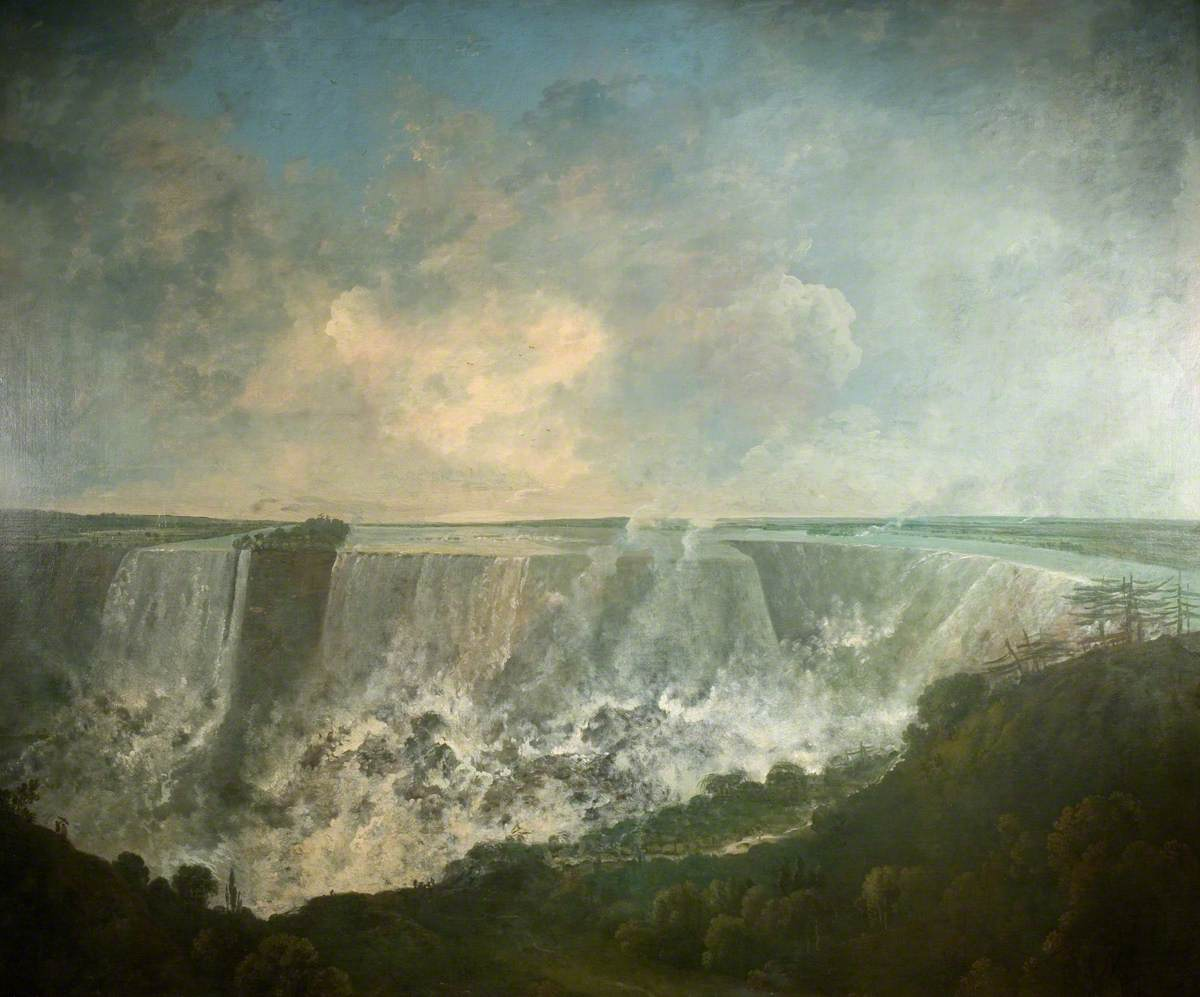
Falls of Niagara (1774), Wolverhampton Art Gallery

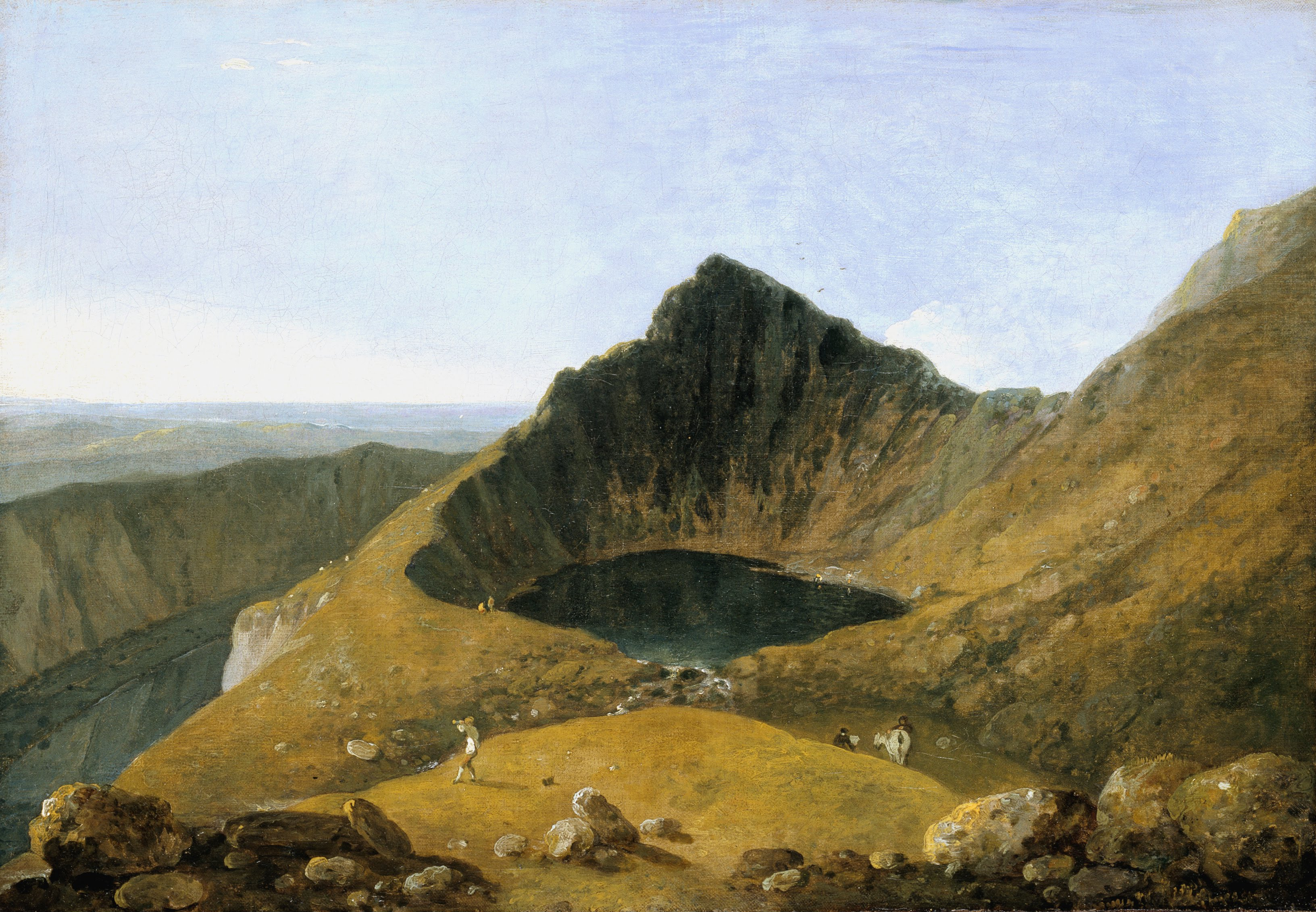
Llyn-y-Cau, Cader Idris (1774)

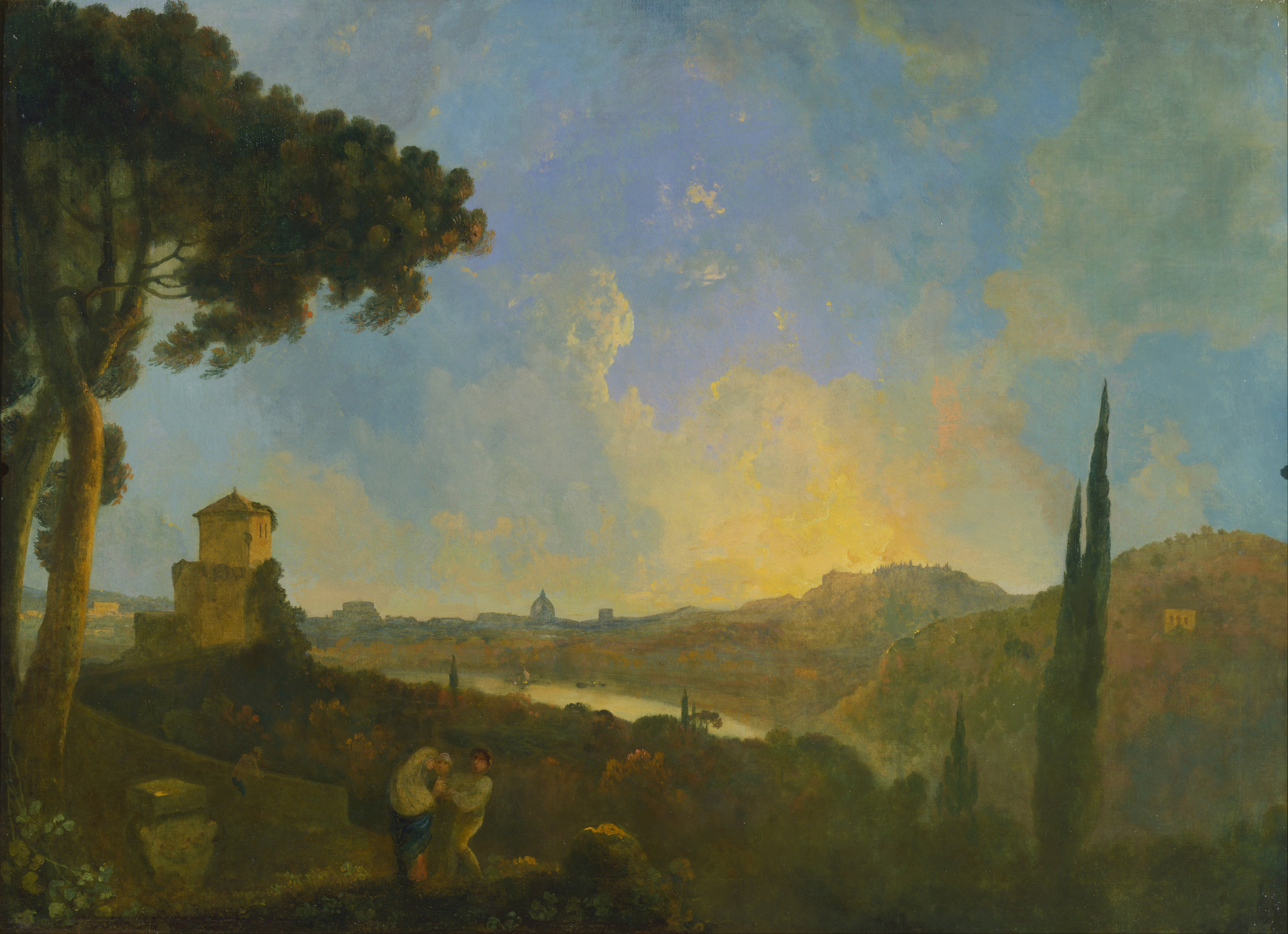
A View of the Tiber with Rome in the Distance (1775)

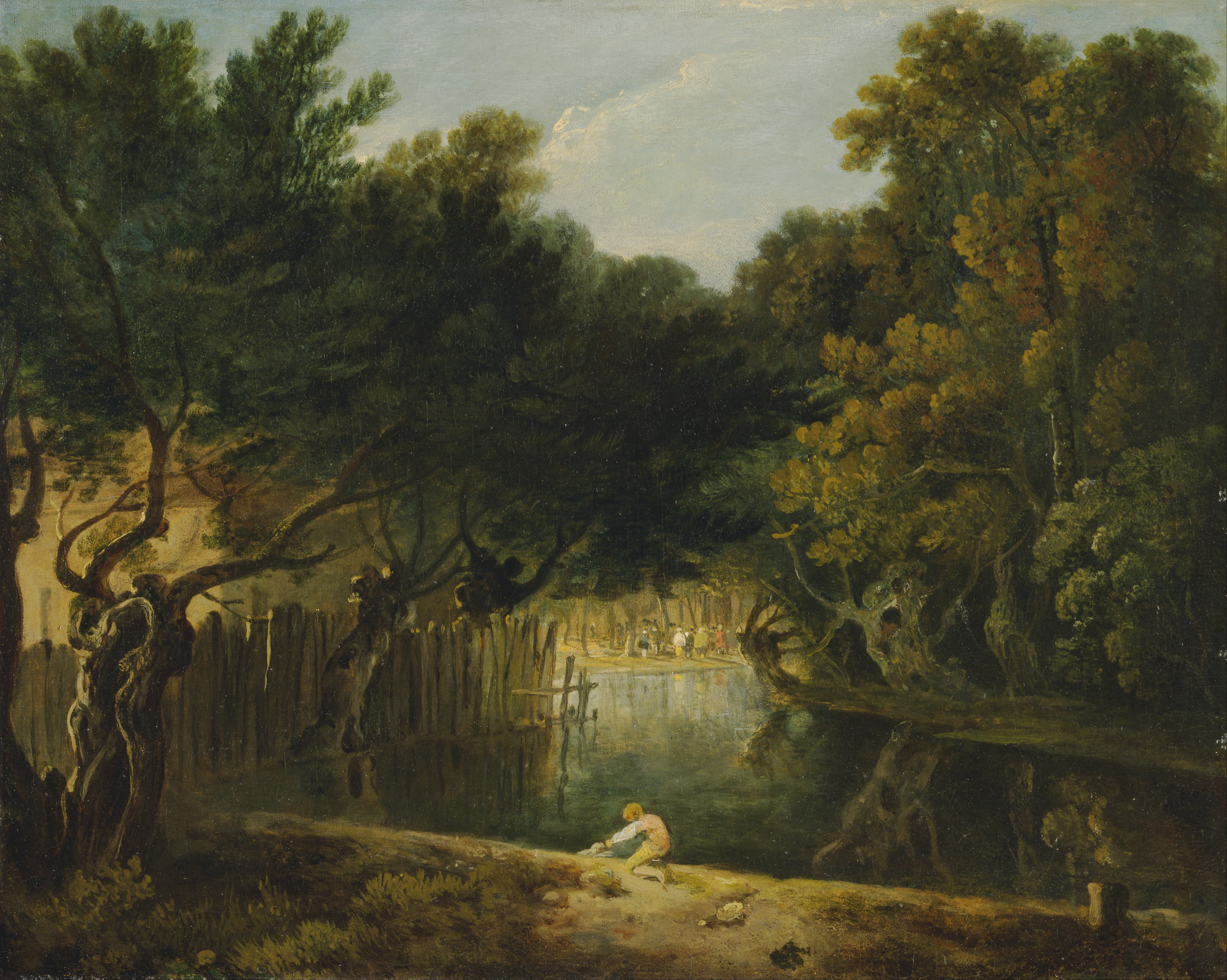
View of the Wilderness in St. James's Park (c.1775)
