= Lake Avernus and the Island of Capri =

Painting by Richard Wilson

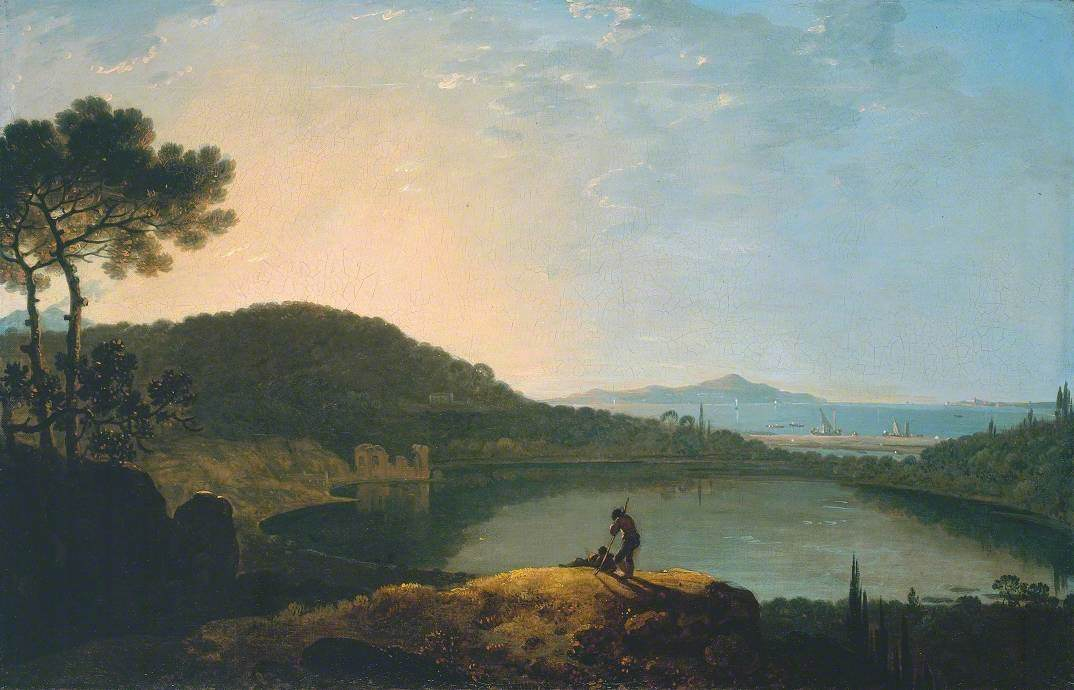
- Artist: Richard Wilson
- Year: 1760
- Type: Oil on canvas, landscape painting
- Medium: oil paint, canvas
- Dimensions: 47 cm × 72.4 cm (19 in × 28.5 in)
- Location: Tate Britain, London
- Collection: Tate
- Accession no.: N00304, NG304
- Identifiers: Art UK artwork ID: lake-avernus-and-the-island-of-capri-202934

Lake Avernus and the Island of Capri is a 1760 landscape painting by the Welsh artist Richard Wilson.

== Description ==
It depicts a scene on the coast of Italy with Lake Avernus in the foreground and the island of Capri in the distance. Baiae can be seen on the extreme right. For many years it was mistakenly believed to feature a view near Pozzuoli, looking across to the island of Ischia.

The Welsh-born Wilson was a pioneer of British landscape painting. He travelled to Italy in 1750 and remained there for a number of years. This picture was produced on his return to London based on sketches he had produced. It was likely to be the work bough by the banker Henry Hoare for his country estate at Stourhead in Wiltshire in 1760.

== Provenance ==
The painting is today in the collection of the Tate Britain, having been presented to the nation by the art collector Robert Vernon in 1847 as part of the Vernon Gift.

== Bibliography ==
- Black, Jeremy. Italy and the Grand Tour. Yale University Press, 2003.
- Bryant, Julius. The English Grand Tour: Artists and Admirers of England's Historic Sites. English Heritage, 2005.
- Solkin, David H. Richard Wilson: The Landscape of Reaction. Tate Gallery, 1982.
