= Llyn-y-Cau, Cader Idris =

Painting by Richard Wilson

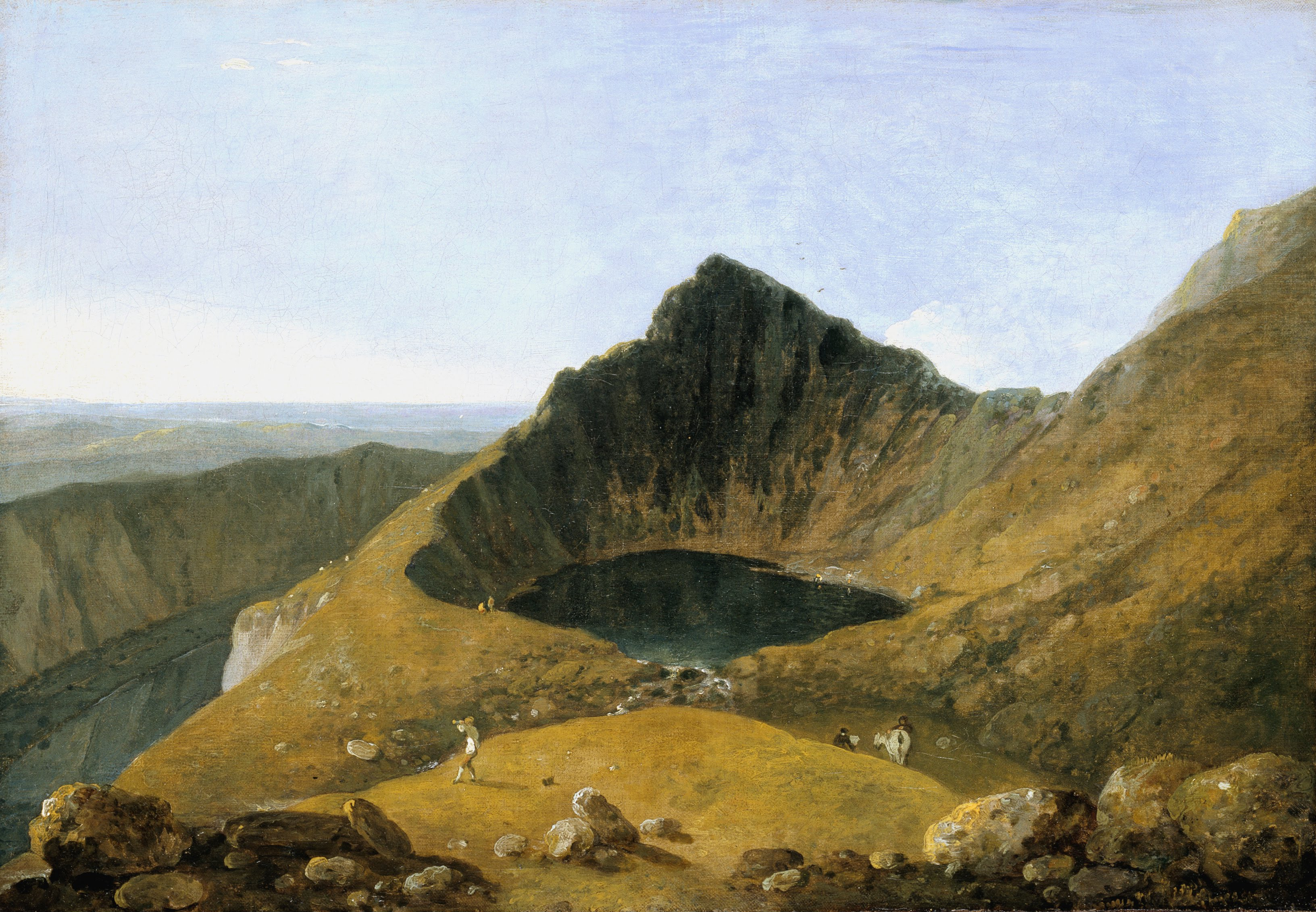
- Artist: Richard Wilson
- Year: 1774
- Type: Oil on canvas, landscape painting
- Dimensions: 51.1 cm × 73 cm (20.1 in × 29 in)
- Location: Tate Britain, London

Llyn-y-Cau, Cader Idris is 1774 landscape painting by the Welsh artist Richard Wilson. It portrays the lake of Llyn-y-Cau near the summit Cadair Idris (Cader Idris) in Snowdonia in North Wales. Wilson, a Welsh painter spent much of his career in London and Italy, but also produced landscape of his native country. It is likely to be a painting he submitted to the Royal Academy's Summer Exhibition of 1774 in Pall Mall. Today the painting is in the collection of the Tate Britain in Pimlico, having been acquired in 1945.

== Bibliography ==
- Lord, Peter. The Tradition: A New History of Welsh Art 1400–1990. Parthian Books, 2023.
- Sambrook, James. The Eighteenth Century: The Intellectual and Cultural Context of English Literature 1700-1789. Routledge, 2014.
- Shanes, Eric. The Genius of the Royal Academy. Royal Academy, 1981.
- Solkin, David H. Richard Wilson: The Landscape of Reaction. Tate Gallery, 1982.
