= The Cock Tavern at Cheam =

Painting by Richard Wilson

- The Cock Tavern, Cheam, Surrey
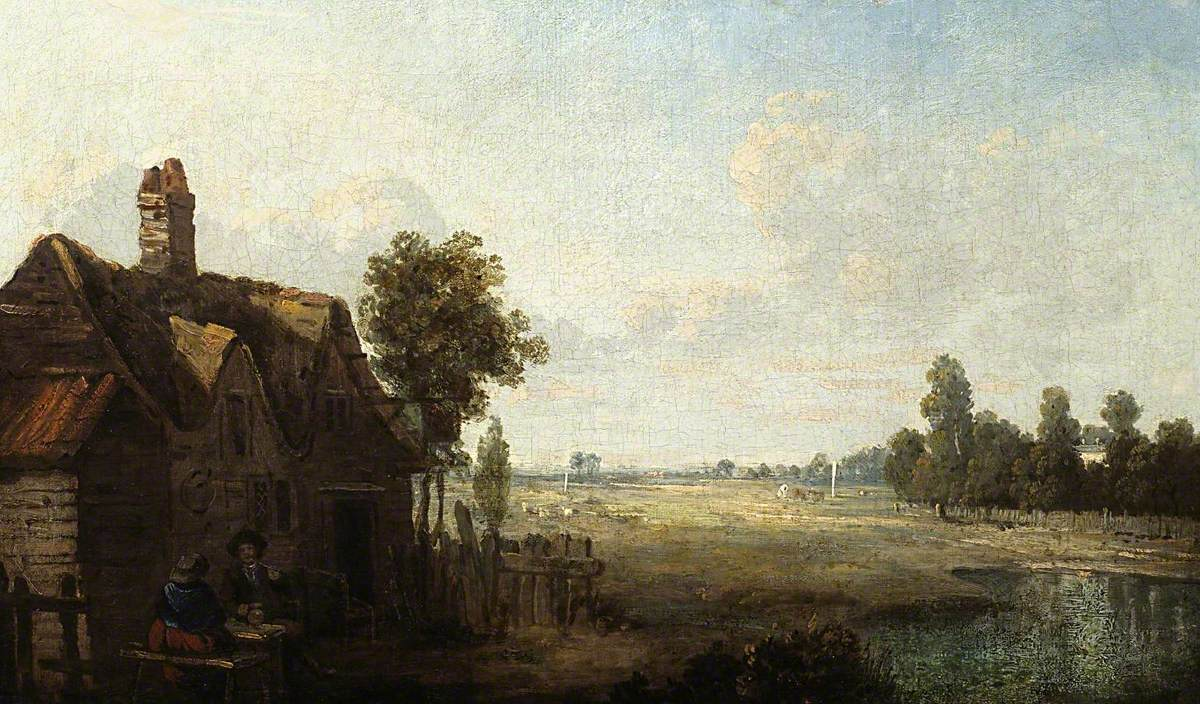
- Artist: Richard Wilson
- Year: c. 1745
- Type: Oil on canvas, landscape painting
- Medium: oil paint, canvas
- Dimensions: 43.6 cm × 73 cm (17.2 in × 29 in)
- Location: Tate Britain, London
- Collection: Tate
- Accession no.: N03136, NG3136
- Identifiers: Art UK artwork ID: the-cock-tavern-cheam-surrey-202918

The Cock Tavern at Cheam is a c.1745 landscape painting by the Welsh artist Richard Wilson.

== Description ==
It likely depicts the Cock Inn, a tavern located on Cheam Common in Sutton (rather than nearby Cheam) in Surrey, then a number of miles outside London. It was a well-known coaching inn on the road from the capital to Brighton. Two men sit outside at a table drinking ale, while in the background is uncultivated common land with grazing sheep.

== Provenance ==
It is now in the collection of the Tate Britain in Pimlico, having been acquired in a bequest from Stopford Brooke in 1916.

A version is also in the Winnipeg Art Gallery.

== Bibliography ==
- Bindman, David. The History of British Art: The history of British art, 1600-1870. Yale Center for British Art, 2008.
- Bury, Adrian. Richard Wilson, R.A.: The Grand Classic. F. Lewis, 1947.
- Solkin, David H. Richard Wilson: The Landscape of Reaction. Tate Gallery, 1982.
- Waites, Ian. Common Land in English Painting, 1700-1850. Boydell Press, 2012.
