= Dover Castle (painting) =

Painting by Richard Wilson

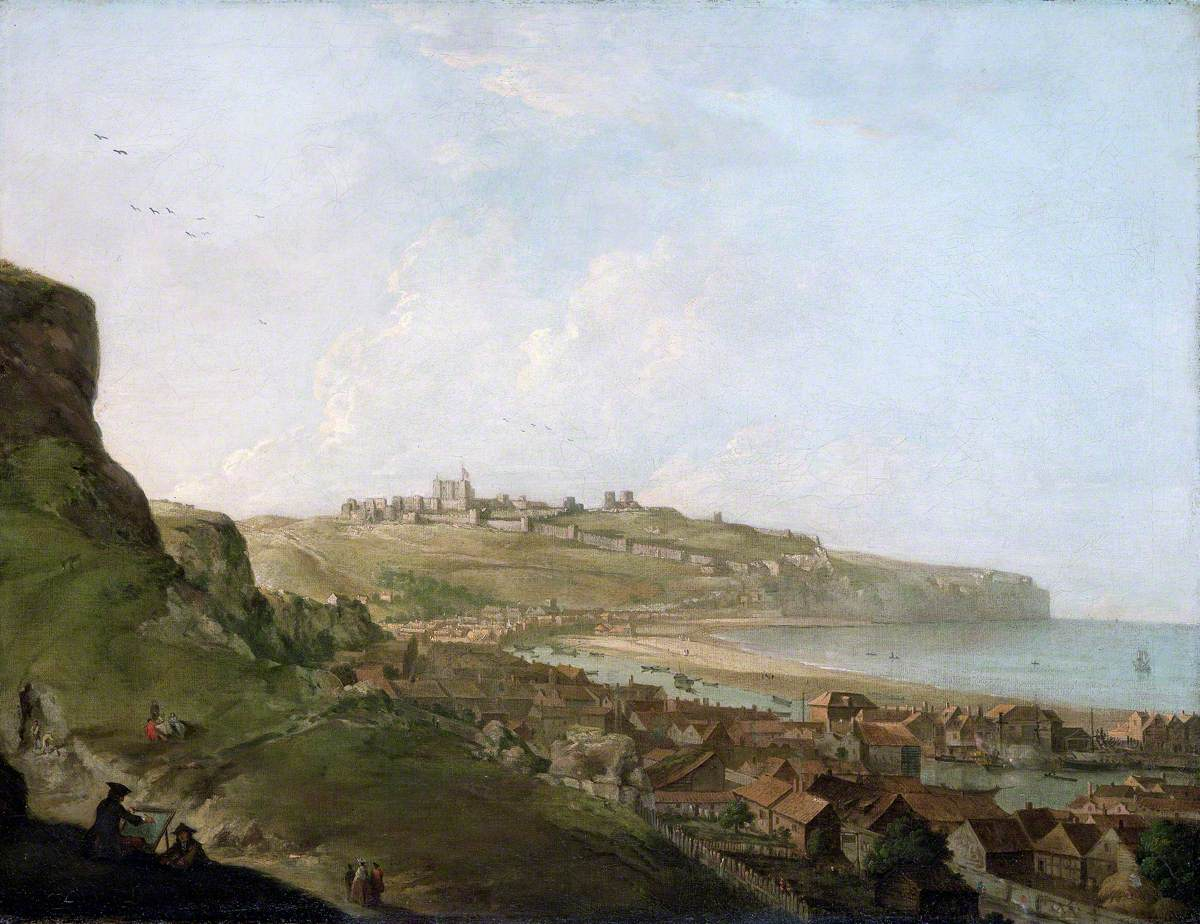
- Artist: Richard Wilson
- Year: c.1747
- Type: Oil on canvas, landscape painting
- Dimensions: 90.5 cm × 116.8 cm (35.6 in × 46.0 in)
- Location: National Museum of Wales, Cardiff

Dover Castle is a c.1747 landscape painting by the British artist Richard Wilson. It features a panoramic view of the port town of Dover in Kent with Dover Castle seen in the distance. It is likely the figure seated at an easel in the foreground is a self-portrait of the artist. The painting is also known as View of Dover. It was the first of his landscape paintings to be engraved. He dedicated the engraving to the influential politician the Duke of Dorset, the Lord Warden of the Cinque Ports. A few years later Wilson left for his lengthy stay in Italy which fundamentally altered his style.

Wilson produced several versions of the scene. One is now in the National Museum of Wales in Cardiff, which acquired it in 1928. Another smaller, version is in the Yale Center for British Art in Connecticut, as part of the Paul Mellon Collection.

== Bibliography ==
- Evans, Mark & Fairclough, Oliver. The National Museum of Wales :A Companion Guide to the National Art Gallery. National Museum of Wales, 1993.
- Solkin, David H. Richard Wilson: The Landscape of Reaction. Tate Gallery, 1982.
