= 1774 in art =

Events from the year 1774 in art.

== Events ==
- Marie Louise Élisabeth Vigée-Lebrun becomes a member of the Académie.

== Works ==
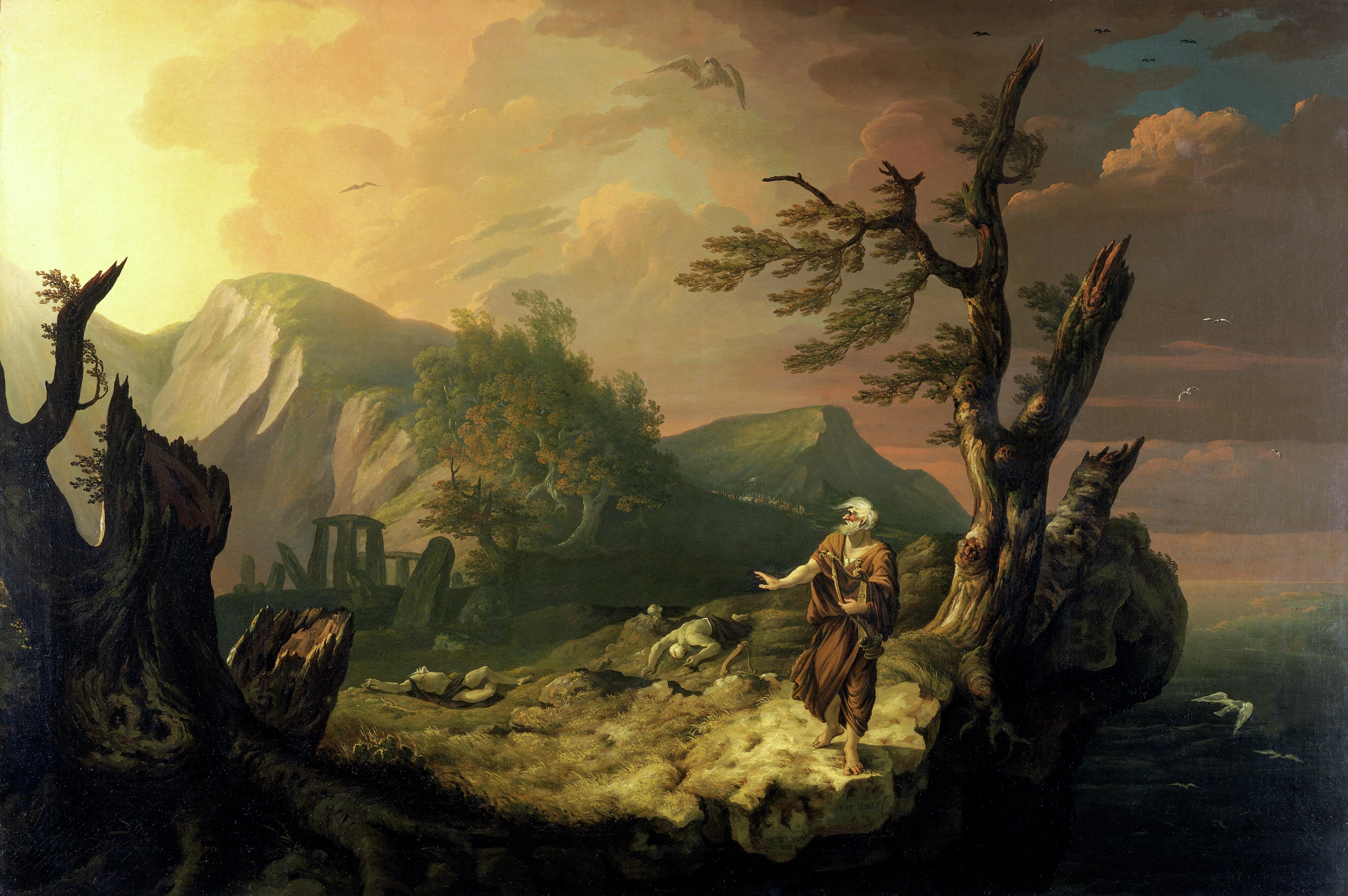
Thomas Jones – The Bard

- Thomas Gainsborough – Portrait of Sir William Blackstone
- Anton Graff – Johann Georg Sulzer
- William Hamilton – King Edgar's First Interview with Queen Elfrida
- Thomas Jones – The Bard
- Angelica Kauffman – Portrait of Lady Georgiana, Lady Henrietta Frances and George John Spencer, Viscount Althorp
- Anton Raphael Mengs – Self-Portrait
- Joshua Reynolds – Portrait of the Earl of Bellamont
- Alexander Roslin – Portrait of Joseph Marie Terray
- Claude-Joseph Vernet
  - The Approach to a Fair
  - Constructing a Main Road
- Richard Wilson
  - Falls of Niagara
  - Llyn-y-Cau, Cader Idris

== Births ==
- January 5 – George Chinnery, English painter working in Asia (died 1852)
- February 17 – Raphaelle Peale, considered the first professional American painter of still-life (died 1825)
- April 18 – Antonio Basoli, Italian painter, interior designer, engraver and professor (died 1848)
- May 13 – Pierre-Narcisse Guérin, French painter (died 1833)
- June 10 – Carl Haller von Hallerstein, German art historian (died 1817)
- August 30 – Henri Van Assche, Belgian painter (died 1841)
- September 5 – Caspar David Friedrich, German Romantic painter (died 1840)
- date unknown
  - Giovanni Balestra, Italian engraver (died 1842)
  - William Barnard, English mezzotint engraver (died 1849)
  - Lisa Erlandsdotter, Swedish artist (died 1854)
  - Jean-Pierre Franque, French historical subjects and portraiture painter (died 1860)
  - Gai Qi, poet and painter born in the west of China under the Qing dynasty (died 1829)
  - William Jennys, American naïve art portrait painter (died 1859)
  - Archer James Oliver, British portrait painter (died 1842)
  - Johann Georg Primavesi, German etcher and painter, primarily of landscapes (died 1855)
  - Richard Sass, English landscape painter, etcher, and drawing master to royalty (died 1849)
  - Charles Henry Schwanfelder, English animal, landscape and portrait painter (died 1837)
  - Marie-Denise Villers, French painter specializing in portraits (died 1821)

== Deaths ==
- January 1 – Jan Jerzy Plersch, Polish sculptor of German origin (born 1704/1705)
- January 13 – Shem Drowne, American coppersmith and tinplate worker (born 1683)
- January 28 – Antonio Galli Bibiena, Italian architect, also at Vienna Hofburg (born 1700)
- April 11 – Elias Gottlob Haussmann, German painter (born 1695)
- April 23 – Christian Wilhelm Ernst Dietrich, German painter (born 1712)
- May 17 – Jeremiah Theus, Swiss-born American painter, primarily of portraits (born 1716)
- July 9 – Anna Morandi Manzolini, Italian sculptor in wax (born 1714)
- August 26 – Philipp Jakob Straub, Austrian sculptor (born 1706)
- September 10 – Pierre-Jean Mariette, French art collector (born 1694)
- October 27 – Gerolamo Mengozzi Colonna, Italian quadratura painter (born 1688)
- December 31 – Johann Christoph Handke, Moravian Baroque painter (born 1694)
- date unknown
  - Marie-Elisabeth Simons, Belgian painter (born 1754)
  - Philippe Caffieri, French sculptor (born 1714)
  - Simon François Ravenet, French engraver (born 1706)
- probable – Anton Čebej, Slovenian baroque painter (born 1722)
