= August Christian Geist =

German painter

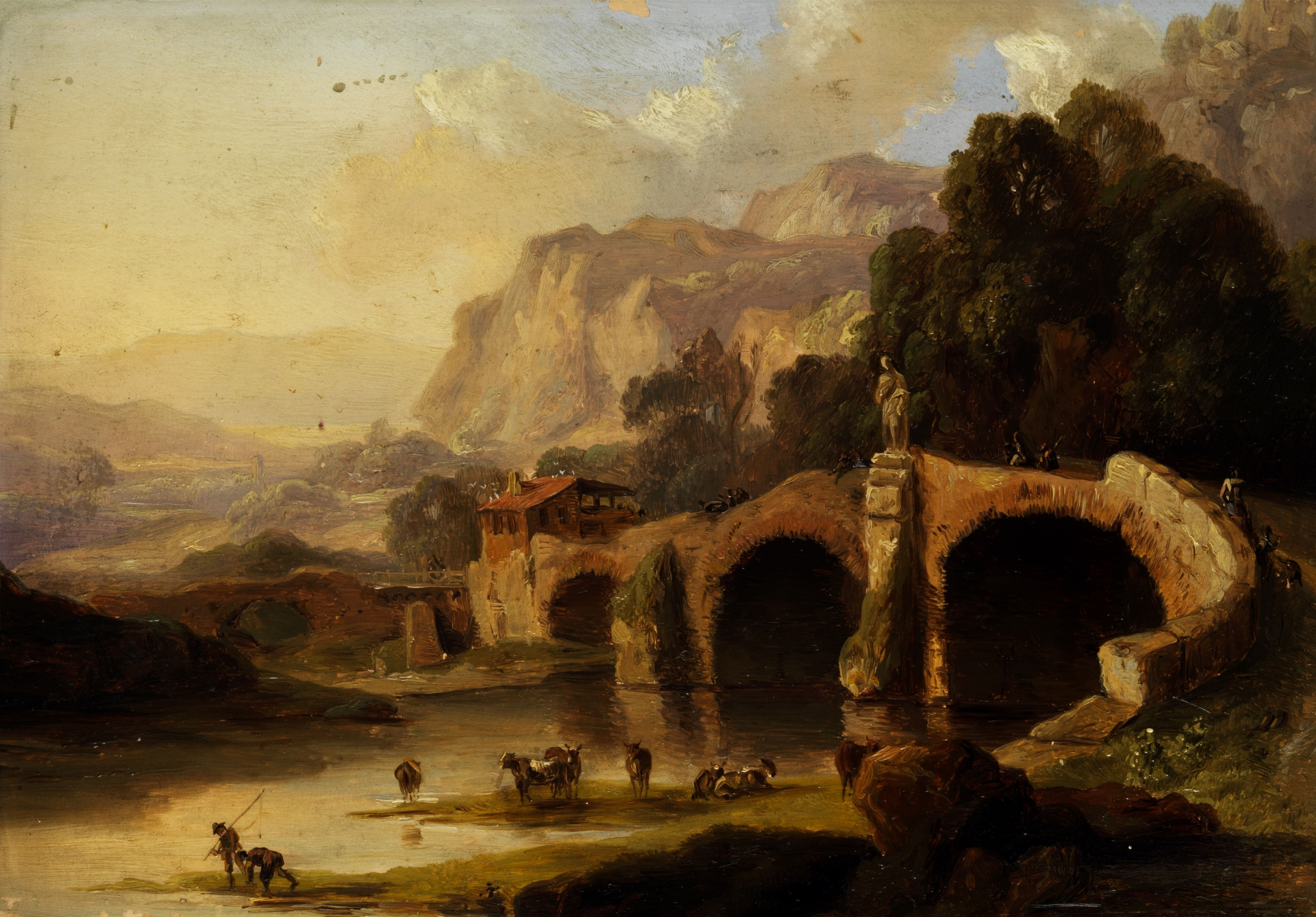
Landscape with river and bridge

August Christian Geist (15 October 1835 - 15 December 1868) was a German landscape painter.

August Geist was born in Würzburg in 1835. He came from a family of painters, starting with his grandfather Josef Geist. His father Andreas Geist was a painter of animals and August's first teacher. August then went to the Polytechnikum of Würzburg, before moving to Munich in 1853 to study under Fritz Bamberger for two years. As an independent artist, he travelled the Alps, and published thirteen engravings of castle ruins in Lower Franconia in 1858, with accompanying text by Martin Theodor Contzen. He stayed with landscape painter Johann Wilhelm Schirmer for a while in 1859. He continued to travel and paint over the next several years, but fell ill when travelling to Italy in 1866. He returned to Munich in 1867, and died in 1868. His many oil paintings and detailed studies were sold at auction in 1869.

His work can be found in the Mainfränkisches Museum in Würzburg, in the National Gallery in Berlin, and in collections in Bamberg and Munich. The Städtische Galerie Würzburg held a Geist exhibition in 1985, with an accompanying catalogue.
