= 1714 in art =

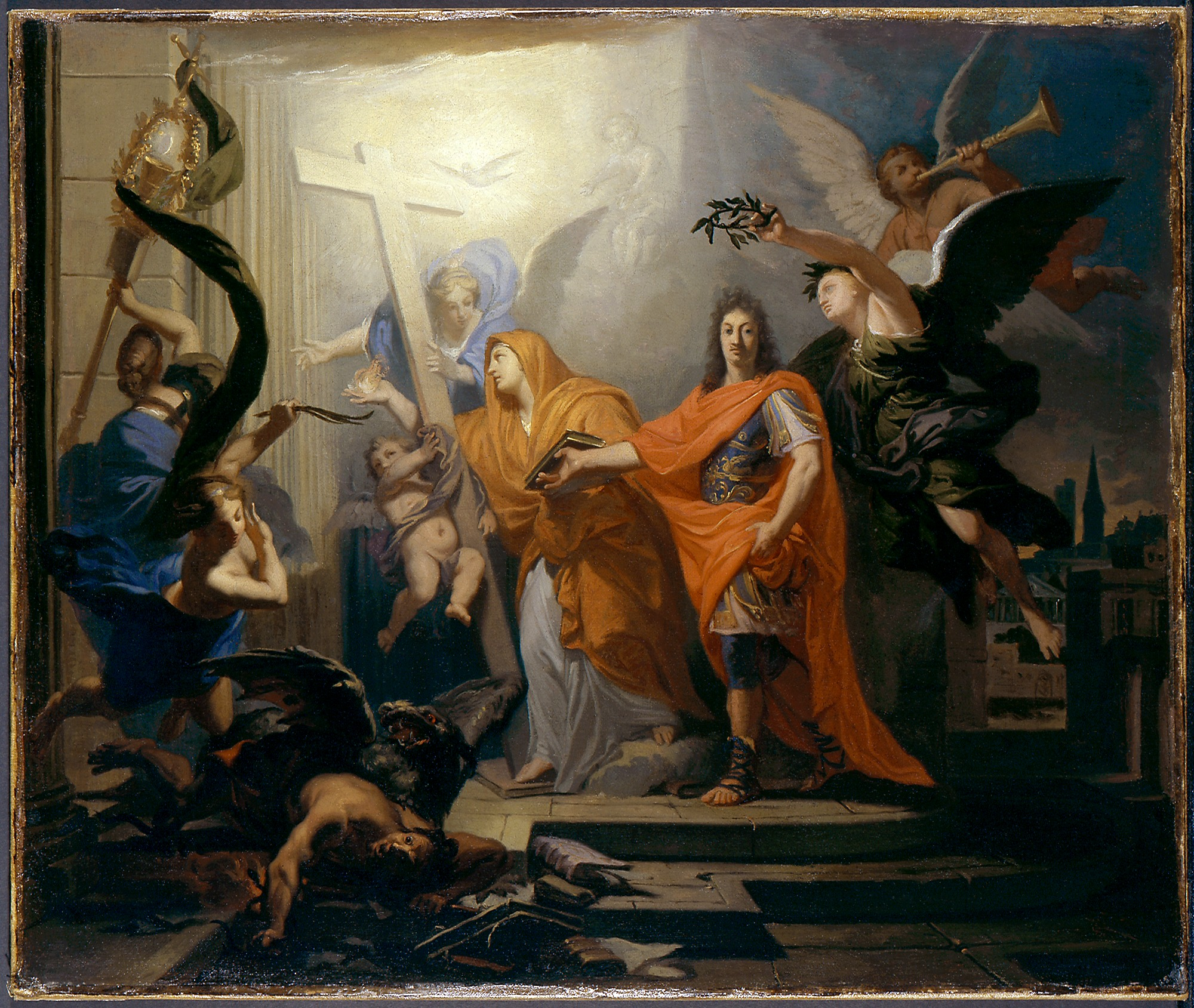
An Allegory by Antoine Rivalz, Probably depicting the Peace of Utrecht of 1713

Events from the year 1714 in art.

== Events ==
- Antoine Coypel becomes director of the Académie de peinture et de sculpture.

== Paintings ==
- Charles Jervas – Portrait of Alexander Pope
- Sir Godfrey Kneller – Portrait of Robert Harley as Lord High Treasurer
- Nicolas de Largilliere - Portrait of a lady as Pomona, traditionally identified as the Marquise de Parabère
- Johann Michael Rottmayr – Coronation of Our Lady (fresco on dome of St. Peter's Church, Vienna)

== Births ==
- January 21 – Anna Morandi Manzolini, Bolognese sculptor in wax (died 1774)
- January 26 – Jean-Baptiste Pigalle, French sculptor (died 1785)
- March 6 – Jean-Baptiste Marie Pierre, French painter, drawer and administrator (died 1789)
- March 25 – Friedrich Christian Glume, German sculptor (died 1752)
- August 1 – Richard Wilson, landscape painter (died 1782)
- August 14 – Claude Joseph Vernet, French painter (died 1789)
- August 28 – Jean-Baptiste Descamps, French writer and painter of village scenes (died 1791)
- November – Pierre-François Brice, Belgian painter (died 1794)
- date unknown
  - Philippe Caffieri, French sculptor (died 1774)
  - Étienne Fessard, French engraver (died 1774)
  - Thomas Johnson, English wood carver and furniture maker (died 1778)
  - Robert Taylor, English stonemason, sculptor and architect (died 1788)

== Deaths ==
- April 28 – Jean-Jacques Clérion, French sculptor (born 1637)
- May – Andreas Schlüter, German sculptor and architect in the Petrine Baroque style (born 1664)
- May 11 – Pierre Le Gros the Elder, French sculptor for the Versailles (born 1629)
- August 20 – Cristóbal de Villalpando, Mexican painter (born 1649)
- October 4 – Peter Strudel, Austrian sculptor and painter (born 1660)
- November 2 – Giuseppe Passeri, Italian painter, active in his native city of Rome (born 1654)
- December 15 – Giovanni Monevi, Italian painter (born 1637)
- date unknown
  - Niccolò Cassana, Venetian portrait painter working in London (born 1659)
  - Giovanni Battista Cimaroli, Italian painter of landscapes (born 1653)
  - Filippo Maria Galletti, Italian painter of religious works and a Theatine priest (born 1636)
  - Gennaro Greco, Italian, also known as "Il Mascacotta", veduta painter (born 1663)
