= William Barnard =

William Barnard may refer to:

- William Barnard (bishop) (1697–1768), Anglican bishop of Raphoe and Derry
- William Barnard (engraver) (1774–1849), English mezzotint engraver
- William O. Barnard (1852–1939), U.S. Representative from Indiana
- Bill Barnard (1886–1958), New Zealand lawyer and politician
- William Stebbins Barnard (1849–1887), American biologist
