= The Bard (poem) =

1757 poem by Thomas Gray

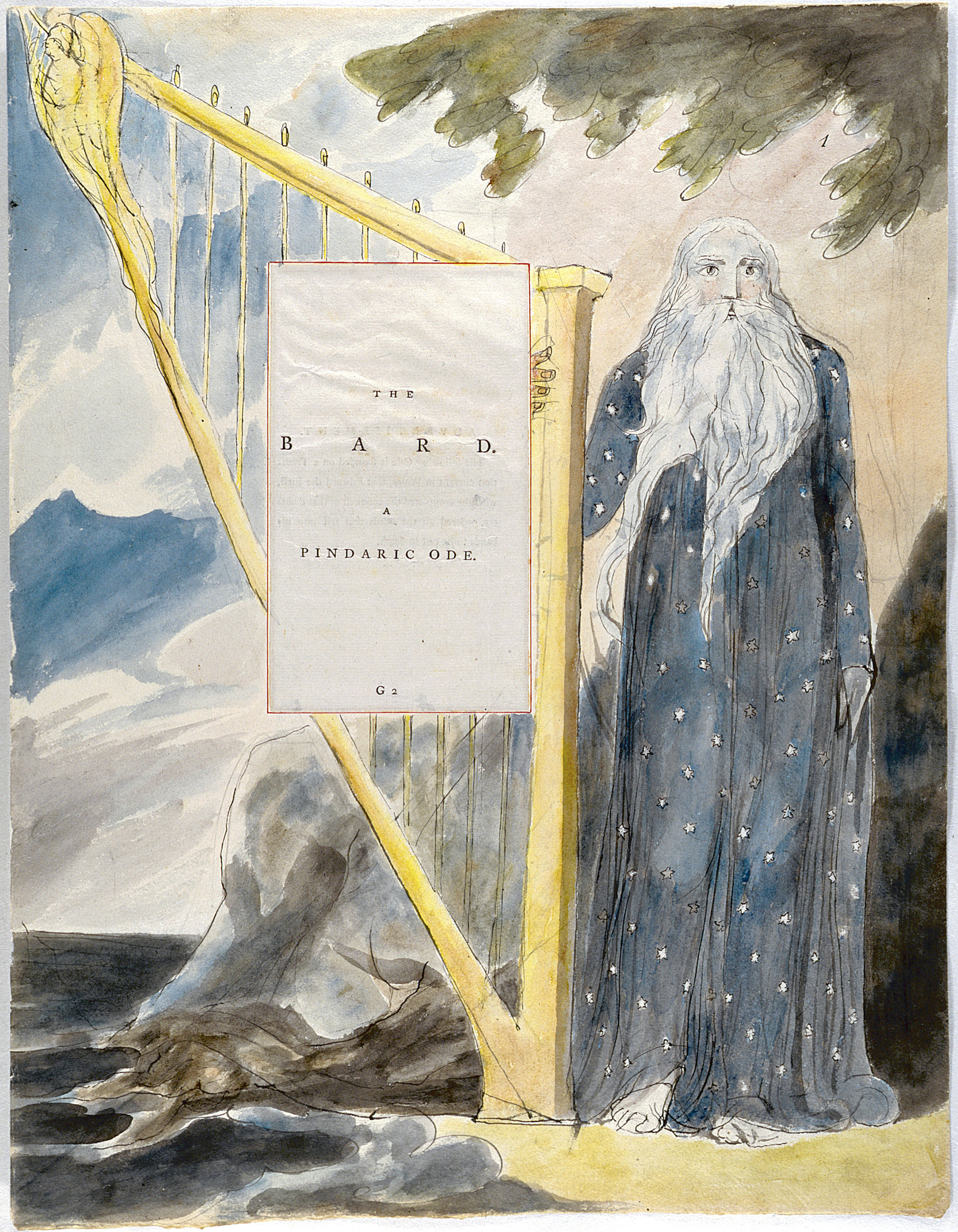
Title-page of The Bard illustrated by William Blake, c. 1798

The Bard. A Pindaric Ode (1757) is a poem by Thomas Gray, set at the time of Edward I's conquest of Wales. Inspired partly by his research into medieval history and literature, partly by his discovery of Welsh harp music, it was itself a potent influence on future generations of poets and painters, seen by many as the first creative work of the Celtic Revival and as lying at the root of the Romantic movement in Britain.

== Synopsis ==
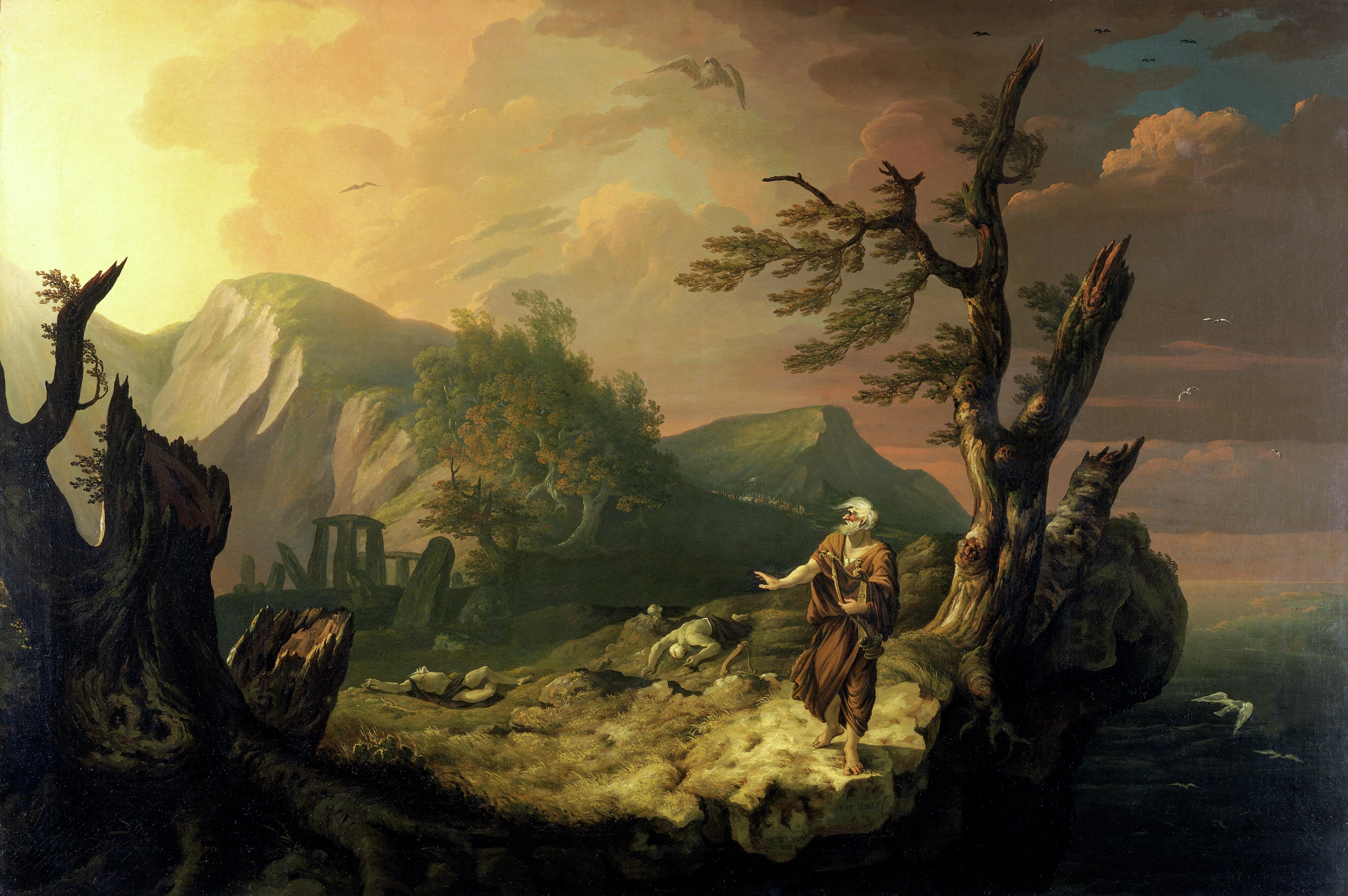
The Bard (1774) by Thomas Jones, National Museum Cardiff

As the victorious army of Edward I marches along the slopes of the Snowdonian mountains near to the river Conwy they encounter a Welsh bard, who curses the king. The bard invokes the shades of Cadwallo, Urien and Mordred, three of Edward's victims, who weave the fate of Edward's Plantagenet line, dwelling on the various miseries and misfortunes of his descendants. The bard goes on to predict the return of Welsh rule over Britain in the form of the house of Tudor, and the flowering of British poetry in the verse of Spenser, Shakespeare and Milton. Finally he tells Edward:

["]...with joy I see
The diff'rent dooms our fates assign.
Be thine despair, and scept'red care,
To triumph, and to die, are mine."
He spoke, and headlong from the mountain's height
Deep in the roaring tide he plunged to endless night.

— lines 139–144

== Composition and publication ==
Gray was a keen student of medieval history, and in time came to make a particular study of the oldest Welsh poetry, though without actually learning the language. Several pages of his commonplace books are devoted to notes on Welsh prosody, and he also mentioned there a legend, now considered quite unhistorical, which he had come across in Thomas Carte's A General History of England (1747–1755). When Edward I conquered Wales, "he is said", wrote Gray, "to have hanged up all their Bards, because they encouraged the Nation to rebellion, but their works (we see), still remain, the Language (tho' decaying) still lives, and the art of their versification is known, and practised to this day among them". Gray also studied early Scandinavian literature, and found in one Old Norse poem the refrain "'Vindum vindum/ Vef Darradar'", which was to reappear in The Bard as "Weave the warp and weave the woof". In 1755 he began work on The Bard, and by August of that year had completed two thirds of the poem. Initially he worked with a speed and a sense of identification that were both unusual for him. "I felt myself the Bard", he declared. But composing the third and final strophe proved more difficult, and he eventually ground to a halt. For two years the poem remained unfinished, but then in 1757 he attended a concert by John Parry, a blind harpist who claimed that the traditional Welsh harp repertoire went back as far as the druids. Gray was so inspired by this experience that he returned to The Bard with new enthusiasm, and was soon able to tell his friend William Mason, "Mr Parry, you must know, has set my Ode in motion again, and has brought it at last to a conclusion." Gray sold the copyright of this poem and of his "The Progress of Poesy" to the publisher Robert Dodsley for 40 guineas, and Dodsley issued them together under the title Odes by Mr. Gray. The book was printed by Gray's friend Horace Walpole who had just set up a printing press at his home, Strawberry Hill, and who had set his heart on inaugurating the enterprise with Gray's poems. The Odes were published on 8 August 1757 as a handsome quarto, with a print run of 2000 copies priced at one shilling. Walpole prevailed on Gray to add four footnotes to The Bard for the first edition, though Gray told Walpole, "I do not love notes…They are signs of weakness and obscurity. If a thing cannot be understood without them, it had better not be understood at all." These proved, for many readers, inadequate to explain the poem, and Gray complacently wrote to Mason "nobody understands me, and I am perfectly satisfied." Rather against his will, he was persuaded to add a few more notes for the 1768 edition.

== Critical reception ==
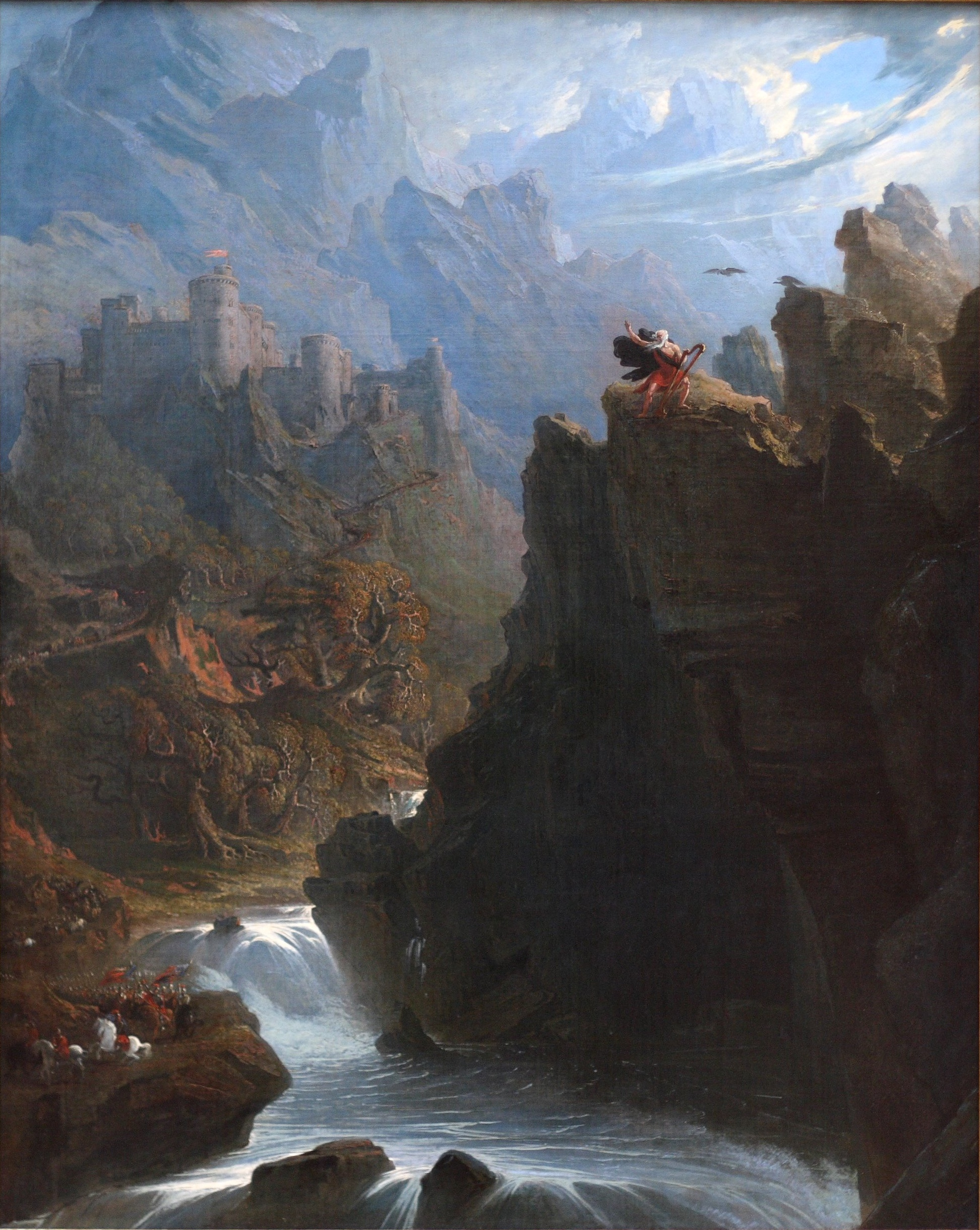
The Bard (c. 1817) by John Martin, Yale Center for British Art

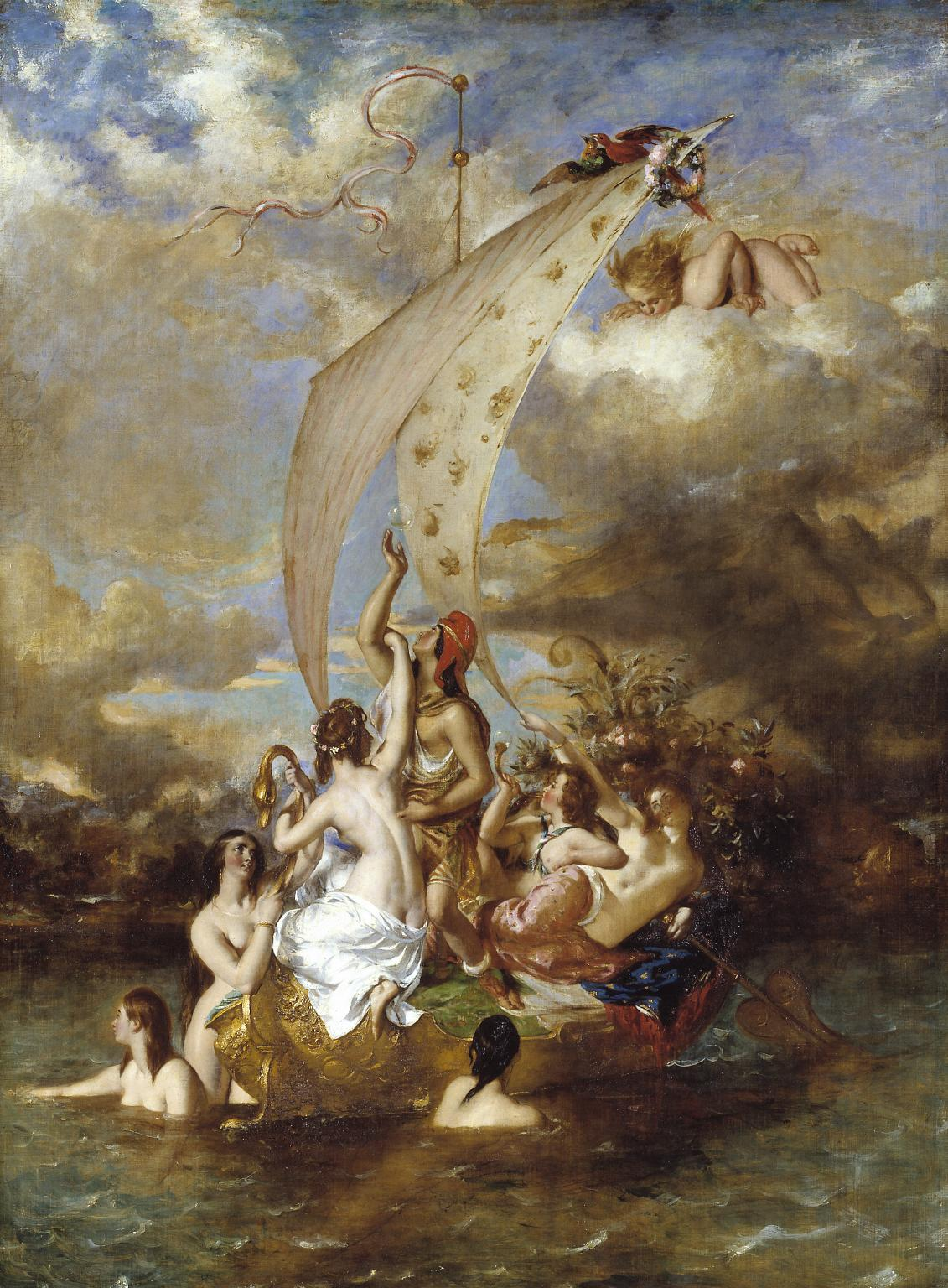
William Etty, Youth on the Prow, and Pleasure at the Helm, 1832

In the general state of ignorance of Welsh culture that prevailed in English literary circles in 1757 The Bard formed something of a challenge to Gray's readers. He claimed that "all people of condition are agreed not to admire, nor even to understand" the Odes. In 1778 the political writer Percival Stockdale was one such negative voice:

If the subject of a Poem is obscure, or not generally known, or not interesting, and if it abounds with allusions, and facts of this improper, and uninteresting character, the writer who chuses the subject, and introduces those improper, and unaffecting allusions, and facts, betrays a great want of poetical judgment, and taste. Mr. Gray had a vitiated fondness for such insipid fable, narrative, and references.

Dr. Johnson characteristically grumbled "I do not see that The Bard promotes any truth, moral or political", and found much of the imagery ridiculous. But from the very beginning Gray's complaint of universal misunderstanding was mistaken. In December 1757, only four months after The Bard was published, Gray was offered the Poet Laureateship . Favourable, even enthusiastic, reviews appeared in the Critical Review, Monthly Review and Literary Magazine, and their voices were soon echoed by many others. John Brown, a then fashionable social commentator, reportedly called The Bard and The Progress of Poesy the best odes in the language; David Garrick thought them the best in any language; Thomas James Mathias compared The Bard favourably to Pindar, Horace, Dante and Petrarch; and by 1807 even Percival Stockdale had changed his mind, and could write of its "poetical excellence". One exception to this trend was Samuel Taylor Coleridge, who in 1799 wrote that "The Bard once intoxicated me, & now I read it without pleasure", and more than thirty years later could still remark that he found it "frigid and artificial". On the whole, however, as Edmund Gosse noted, The Bard "for at least a century remained almost without a rival among poems cherished by strictly poetical persons for the qualities of sublimity and pomp of vision."

== Literary influence ==
The publication of The Bard started a new chapter in the history of English poetry. It might be called the first primitivist poem in the English language, and certainly its success inspired a new generation of writers to turn their attention to Welsh and Gaelic themes from the distant past in a movement which came to be known as the Celtic Revival. One of the first to be so influenced was the Scot James Macpherson, whose prose poems issued under the name of the ancient bard Ossian achieved extraordinary popularity, spreading the Celtic glamour across Europe and America. Also indirectly inspired by The Bard were Walter Scott's hugely popular evocations of the Scottish past. The Bard, in fact, was a precursor of Romanticism, or as the critic William Powell Jones put it, Gray "started a flame…when he wrote The Bard, and the fire swept into the Romantic movement itself." Its influence extended to Ernest Renan, Matthew Arnold, and as far as W. B. Yeats and the other Anglo-Irish writers of the Celtic Twilight. In portraying Isabella of France as beautiful but manipulative or wicked, he combined Christopher Marlowe's depiction of Isabella with William Shakespeare's description of Margaret of Anjou (the wife of Henry VI) as the "She-Wolf of France", to qualify The Bard as anti-French, in which [she] rips apart the bowels of Edward II with her "unrelenting fangs." The "She-Wolf" epithet stuck, and Bertolt Brecht re-used it in The Life of Edward II of England (1923). One measure of the poem's place in the culture of the English-speaking world lies in the academic James MacKillop's claim that "The current standard English definition of this Celtic word [bard], denoting a poet of exalted status, i.e. the voice of a nation or people, dates from Thomas Gray's use of it in his poem".

== The Bard in other media ==
=== Visual arts ===
- Paul Sandby, An Historical Landskip Representing the Welsh Bard in the Opening of Mr. Gray's Celebrated Ode, 1761. Untraced.
- Thomas Jones, The Bard, from Mr. Gray's Ode, "But oh! what glorious scenes", 1774, oil on canvas. National Museum of Wales.
- Henry Fuseli, series of drawings, 1770–1778. One reproduced in Paul Ganz The Drawings of Henry Fuseli (1949); another in F.I. McCarthy, "The Bard of Thomas Gray, Its Composition and its use by Painters", The National Library of Wales Journal, vol. 14 (1965), Plate 9.
- Benjamin West, The Bard, 1778, oil on oak. Tate Britain. Reproduced in Nigel Llewellyn and Christine Riding (eds.), The Art of the Sublime (2013).
- William Blake, series of illustrations, c. 1797–1798, pen and watercolour on paper. Yale Center for British Art. Reproduced at the Blake Archive.
- J. M. W. Turner, Caernarvon Castle, 1800, watercolour on paper. Tate Britain. One of an unfinished pair inspired by The Bard.
- J. M. W. Turner, Looking down a Deep Valley towards Snowdon, with an Army on the March, 1800–1802, gouache and watercolour on paper. Tate Britain. An unfinished painting, probably intended as a companion-piece to Caernarvon Castle.
- Benjamin West, The Bard, 1809, oil on canvas. The Israel Museum collection gift of Herman and Lila Shickman, New York to American Friends of the Israel Museum.
- William Blake, The Bard, 1809(?), tempera and gold on canvas. Tate Britain. Reproduced at the Tate website.
- John Martin, The Bard, c. 1817, oil on canvas. Yale Center for British Art.
- William Etty, Youth on the Prow, and Pleasure at the Helm (a line from the poem), Tate Gallery (and an earlier version)

=== Sculpture ===
- William Theed, The Bard, 1858, marble. Mansion House, London.

=== Music ===
- John Christopher Smith, a proposed serenata or oratorio, never brought to fruition. Gray wrote detailed notes for Smith's benefit on the precise structure the work should take.
- John Callcott, The Bard, for solo voices, 4-part chorus, orchestra and continuo. 1786.
- William Horsley, Cold is Cadwallo's Tongue, c. 1810. A glee.
- Edwin George Monk, The Bard: A Selection from Gray's Ode, for baritone, chorus and piano. 1856.
- Charles Villiers Stanford, The Bard: A Pindaric Ode by Thomas Gray, for bass, chorus and orchestra, Op. 50. 1892; first performed 1895.

=== Theatre ===
- James Boaden, The Cambro-Britons, 1798. Act iii, sc. 5 is a dramatization of The Bard.
