= Francesco Renaldi =

English painter

- Born: c. 1755
- Education: Royal Academy of Arts

Francesco Renaldi (c. 1755 – c. 1798 or later) was an English painter.

Renaldi entered the Royal Academy Schools in London in October 1776, aged twenty-one. For two years after 1781, Renaldi traveled in Italy, initially with the Welsh landscape painter Thomas Jones. Renaldi was active as a painter in India from 1786 to 1796. After his return from India, Renaldi exhibited a conversation piece group portrait of Thomas Jones and his family at the Royal Academy in 1798 (now in the collection of Amgueddfa Cymru – Museum Wales).

== Works ==
Works painted by Renaldi in India include Muslim Lady Reclining (1789), inscribed as being painted at "Dacca" (i.e. Dhaka) (now in the Yale Center for British Art), and a portrait of the British East India Company's Paymaster General Charles Cockerell and his Wife, Maria Tryphena, and her Sister, Charlotte Blunt (1789) (sold at Christie's, London, 17 March 1978, lot 62).

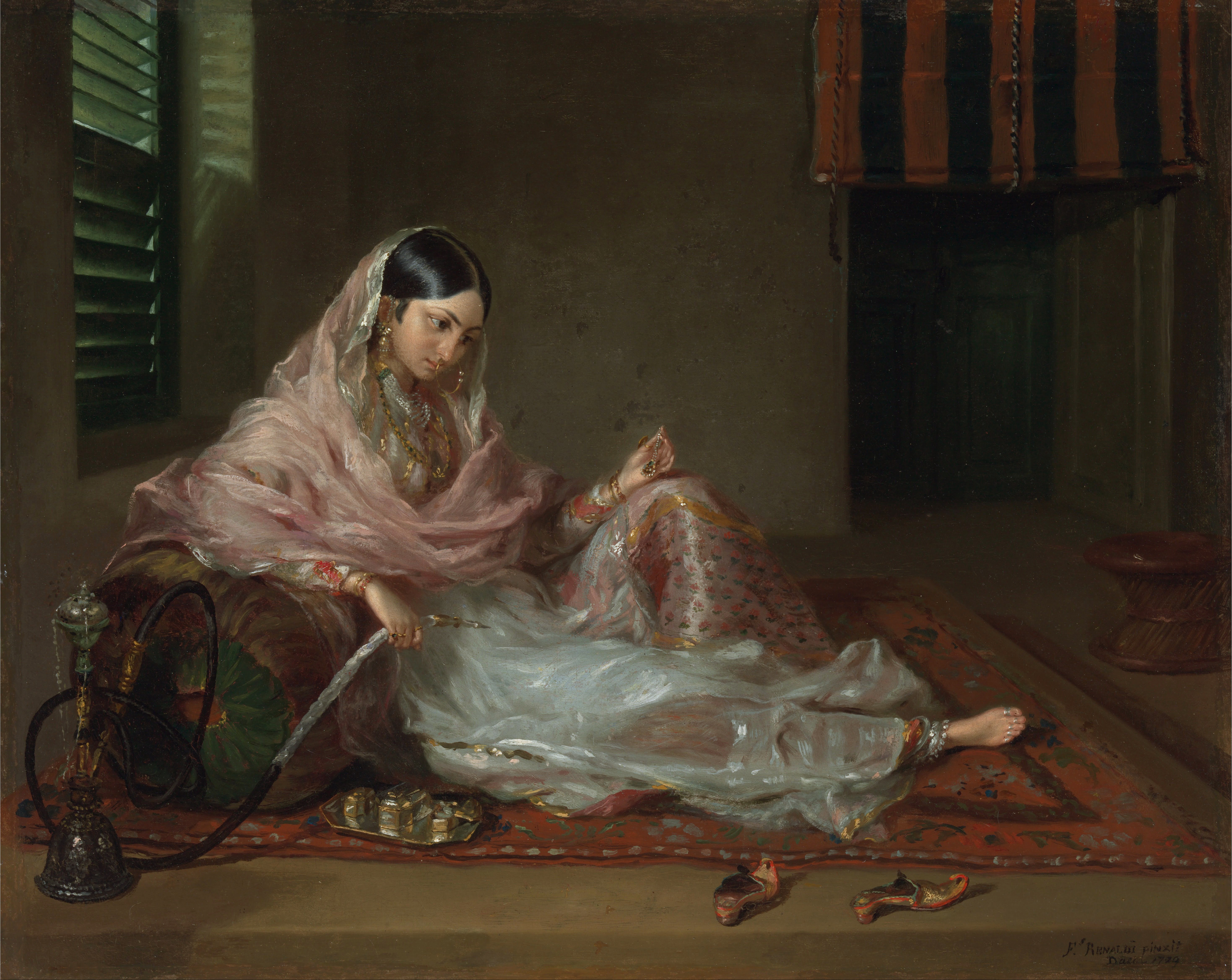
Muslim Lady Reclining, c.1789

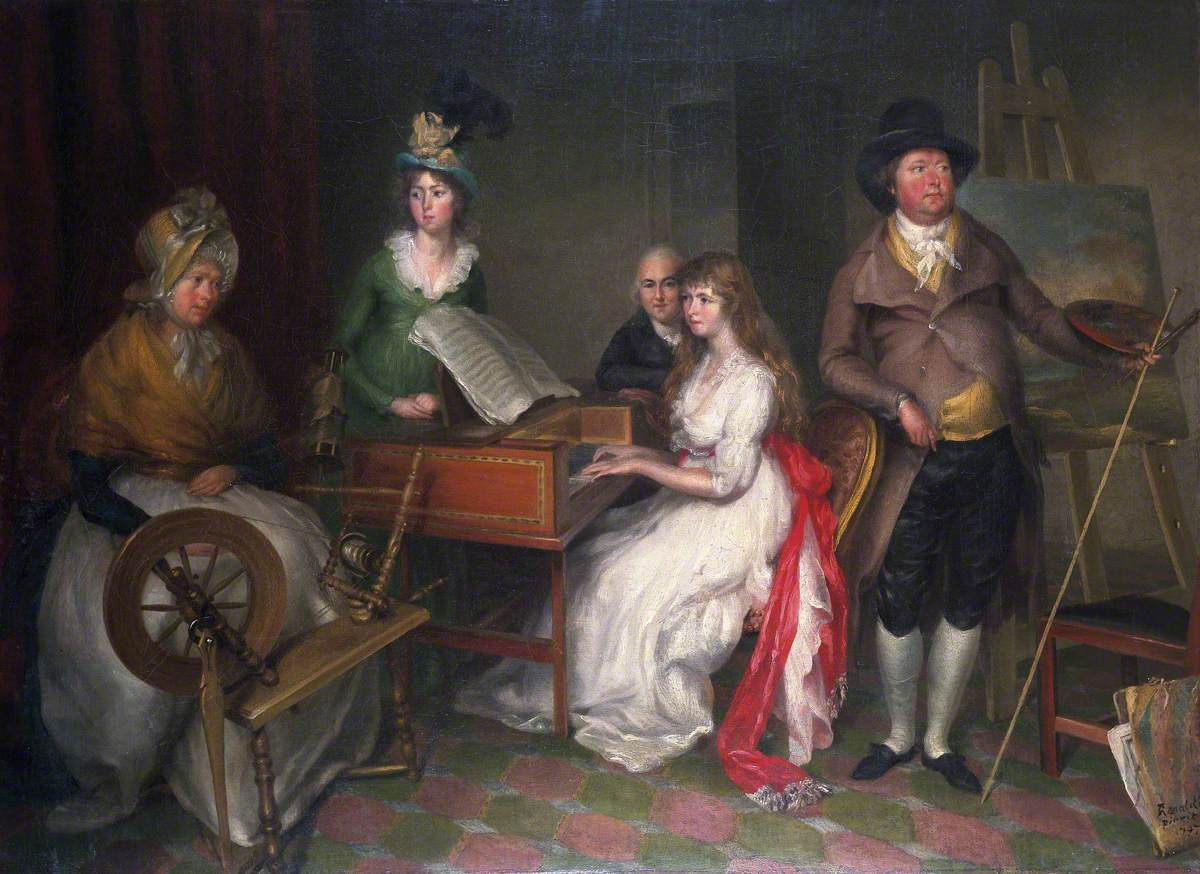
Thomas Jones and his Family c.1797

== Bibliography ==
Mildred Archer, India and British Portraiture, 1770-1825 (London and New York, 1979) (pp 280–297)

William Foster, 'British artists in India, 1760-1820' The Volume of the Walpole Society 19 (1930–1931) 1 (p 65)
