= Fritz Bamberger (painter) =

German painter

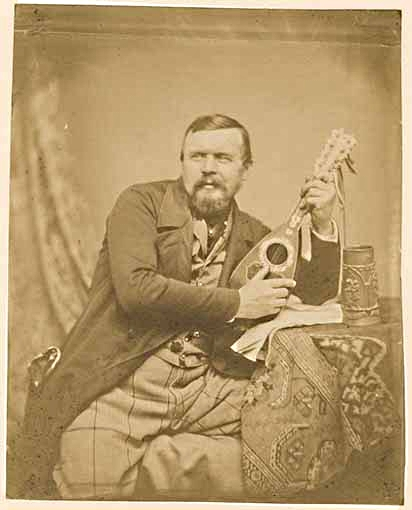
Fritz Bamberger

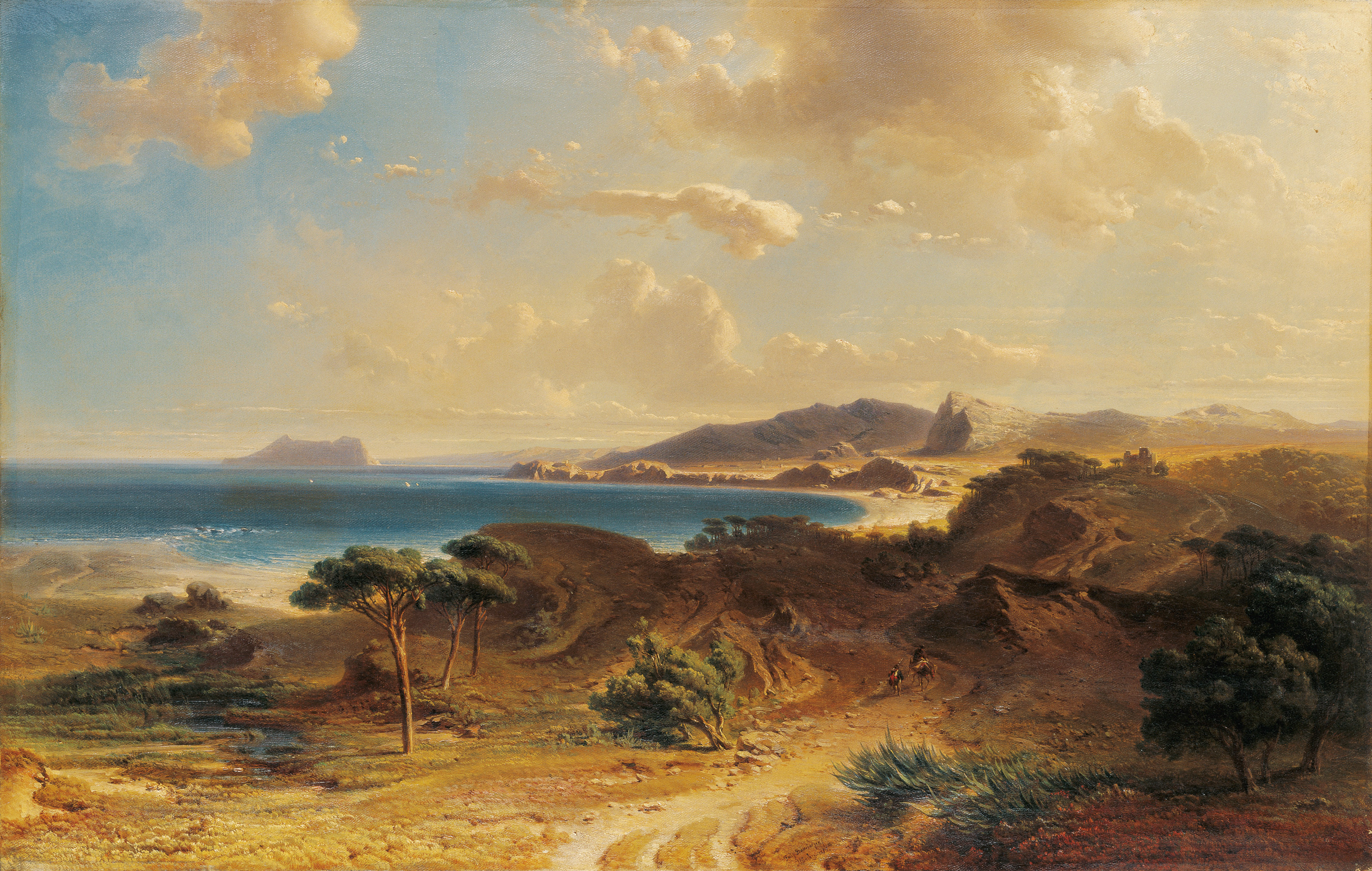
The Beach at Estepona (1855)

Fritz Bamberger (October 17, 1814 – August 13, 1873) was a German painter, primarily of landscapes.

== Biography ==
Bamberger was born in Würzburg in the Kingdom of Bavaria, the fourth son of two Bavarian musicians. His parents retired in 1820, and he moved with them to Frankfurt, where his sister Sabine became an opera singer. He spent part of his childhood in Dresden and Berlin, beginning to learn drawing and painting. He moved back to Würzburg in 1828, and then studied painting under Johann Georg Primavesi in Kassel from 1831. He also studied at the Prussian Academy of Arts and in Munich under Carl Rottmann. He moved back to Frankfurt in 1835, and began painting various landscapes; he took a trip to France and England in 1836 to gain additional material for his paintings. One result of his travels was The Battlefield of Hastings with a view of the sea.

His artistic career was interrupted from 1837 to 1840 as he served a three-year term with the artillery corps in Würzburg. He returned to Frankfurt after his service ended, and began painting again. He took several trips to Spain, which would prove to have a large influence on his career, as he began specializing in scenes of the Spanish landscape. Among his noted works in this area are views of Gibraltar (at Munich), Algeciras and Granada. He later moved to Munich, where he became well known, painting both landscapes and portraits of nobles. He was made a professor in 1870, but his health began to deteriorate, and he died in 1873 during a therapeutic trip to Neuenhain in Bad Soden.

== See also ==
- List of German painters
