= The Bard (Jones) =

Painting by Thomas Jones

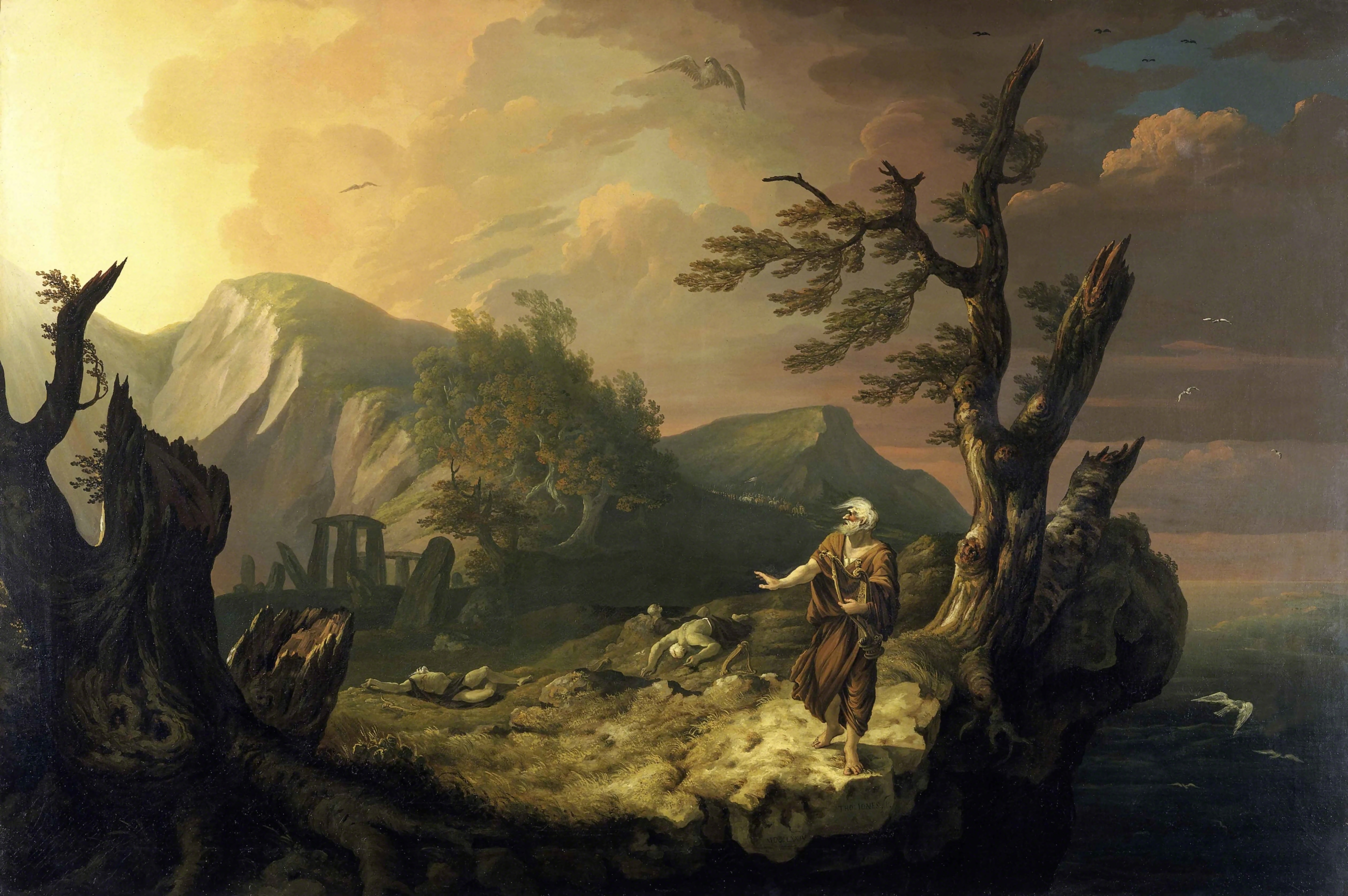
- Artist: Thomas Jones
- Year: 1774
- Type: Oil on canvas, historical landscape painting
- Dimensions: 114.5 cm × 168 cm (45.1 in × 66 in)
- Location: National Museum of Wales, Cardiff

The Bard is a 1774 oil painting by the Welsh artist Thomas Jones. The painting is inspired by the 1757 poem The Bard by the English writer Thomas Gray. Romantic in style, it depicts a scene from the Conquest of Wales by Edward I. A Welsh bard, clutching a harp, prepares to throw himself off a cliff after placing a curse on Edward I.

A pupil of Richard Wilson, Jones was noted for his British and later Italian landscapes. Amongst other artists to produce works inspired by Gray's poem are Benjamin West's The Bard (1809) and John Martin's The Bard (1817). The work was exhibited at the 1774 annual exhibition of the Society of Artists held in London. Today the painting is in the collection of the National Museum of Wales in Cardiff, which acquired it in 1965.

== Bibliography ==
- Evans, Mark & Fairclough, Oliver. The National Museum of Wales :A Companion Guide to the National Art Gallery. National Museum of Wales, 1993.
- Haywood, Ian, Matthews, Susan & Shannon, Mary L. (ed.) Romanticism and Illustration. Cambridge University Press, 2019.
