= Thomas Johnson (designer) =

English wood carver and furniture maker

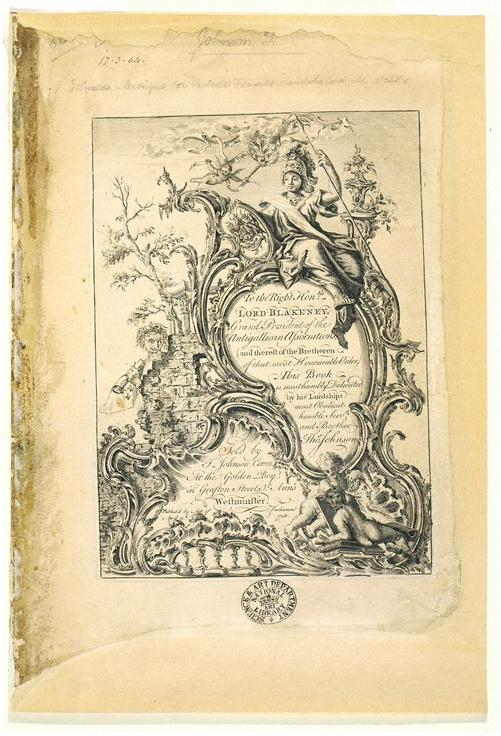
Etching, 1758, Thomas Johnson V&A Museum no. E.3780-1903

Thomas Johnson (1714–1778) was an English wood carver and furniture maker.

== Work ==
Johnson worked in London and is particularly known for bold or extreme use and mixture of rococo, Chinese, and rustic motifs. He was said to be one of the most successful exponents of the rococo style, giving it a vitality not seen in the work of other designers. Among other works, he adapted scenes from Francis Barlow's illustrations of Aesop's Fables.

Of excellent repute as a craftsman and an artist in wood, Johnson's original conceptions and his adaptations of other's ideas were remarkable for their extreme flamboyance, and for the merciless manner in which he overloaded them with thin and meretricious ornament. He participated in the Antigallican Association, an informal group opposed to French fashion and influence. Some of his designs, however, were taken from French works. Many of his pieces were also more fanciful expression of Thomas Chippendale's design ideas.

The three leading "motives" of the time—Chinese, Gothic and Louis Quatorze—were mixed up in his work in the most amazing manner. He was exceedingly fond of introducing human figures, animals, birds and fishes in highly incongruous places. He appears to have defended his enormities on the ground that "all men vary in opinion, and a fault in the eye of one may be a beauty in that of another; 'tis a duty incumbent on an author to endeavour at pleasing every taste."

== Books ==
In the 1750s he published several books of designs which were widely used for things like ceiling moulding. These books include Twelve Girandoles in 1755, The Book of the Carver in 1758, a folio volume of Designs for Picture Frames, Candelabra, Ceilings, &c. also in 1758 and monthly between 1755 and 1758, One hundred and fifty New Designs. He also had a great influence on Ince and Mayhew's book, The Universal System of Household Furniture.
