= The Bard (Martin) =

Painting by John Martin

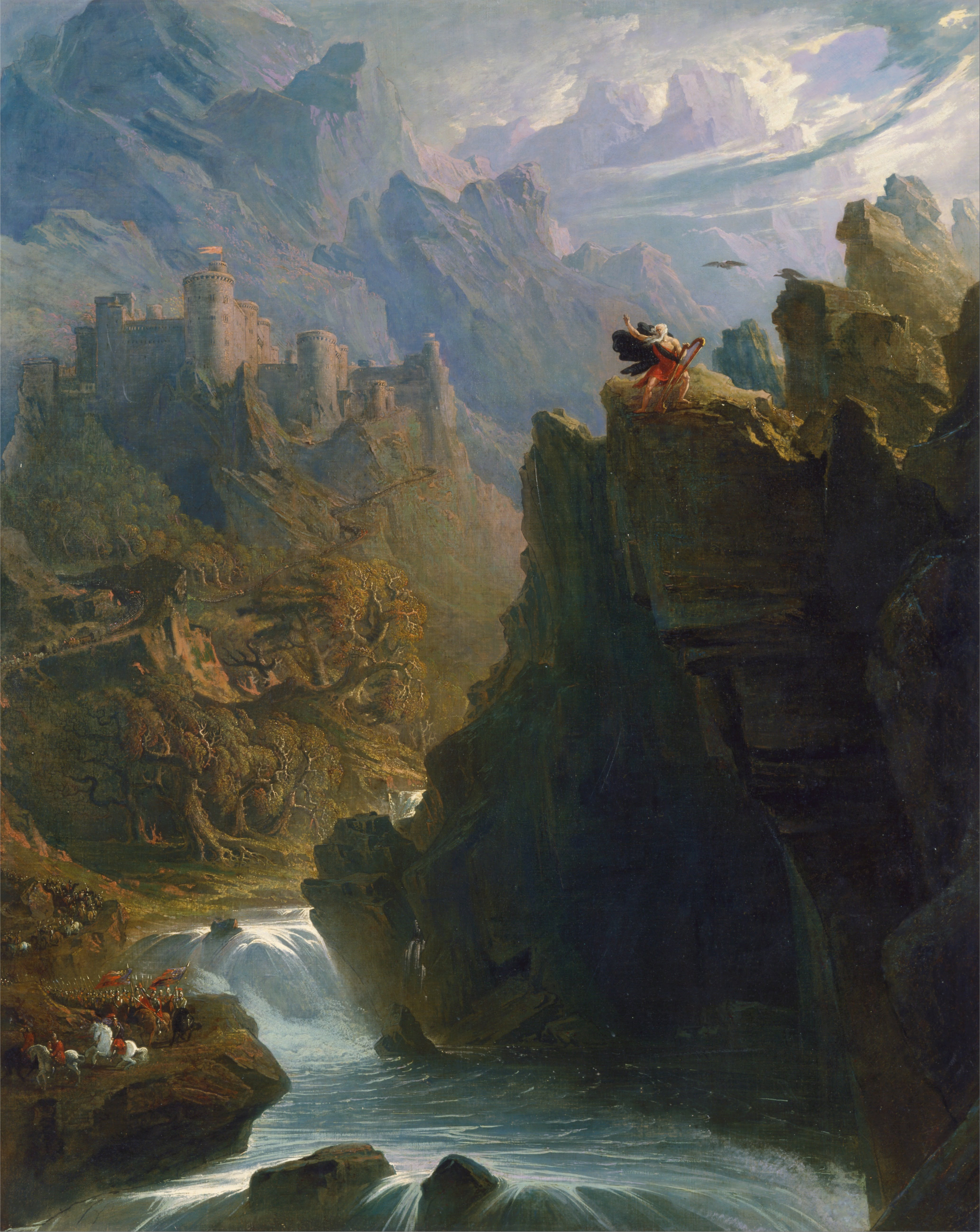
- Artist: John Martin
- Year: 1817
- Type: Oil on canvas, historical landscape painting
- Dimensions: 127 cm × 101.6 cm (50 in × 40.0 in)
- Location: Yale Center for British Art, New Haven

The Bard is an 1817 historical landscape painting by the British artist John Martin. Inspired by the 1757 poem The Bard by Thomas Gray, it depicts a scene during the Conquest of Wales by Edward I. A Welsh bard shouts defiance at the army of Edward from a rock over the River Conwy before throwing himself to his death. Conwy Castle (completed later by Edward) can be seen in the distance.

It featured at the Royal Academy's Summer Exhibition of 1817 at Somerset House and at the British Institution the following year. In 1822, it was part of Martin's one-man show at the Egyptian Hall in Piccadilly. The painting is in the collection of the Yale Center for British Art in Connecticut.

== Bibliography ==
- Alexander, Michael. Medievalism: The Middle Ages in Modern England. Yale University Press, 2017.
- Myrone, Martin. John Martin: Apocalypse. Tate Publishing, 2012.
- Rogers, Pat. The Oxford Illustrated History of English Literature. Oxford University Press, 2001.
