= Thomas Jones (artist) =

Welsh landscape painter (1742–1803)

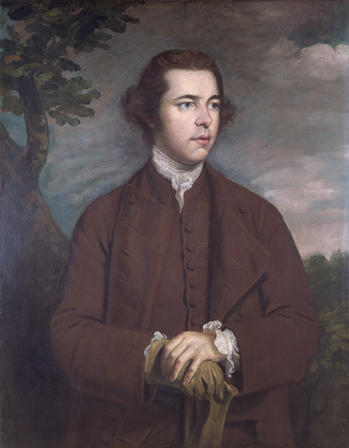
Giuseppe Marchi, Portrait of Thomas Jones (1768). Oil on canvas, 92.0 × 72.0 cm. National Museum Cardiff

Thomas Jones (26 September 1742 – 29 April 1803) was a Welsh landscape painter. He was a pupil of Richard Wilson and was best known in his lifetime as a painter of Welsh and Italian landscapes in the style of his master. However, Jones's reputation grew in the 20th century when more unconventional works by him, not originally intended for exhibition, came to light. Most notable among these is a series of small views of details of ordinary buildings in Naples which he painted from 1782 to 1783. By breaking with the conventions of classical landscape painting in favour of direct observation, they look forward to the work of Camille Corot and the Barbizon School in the 19th century.

He came from a gentry family, and inherited the estates in 1787, after which he mostly lived in Wales, and seems to have painted little. His autobiography, Memoirs of Thomas Jones of Penkerrig, went unpublished until 1951 but is now recognised as an important source of information on the 18th-century art world.

== Biography ==
=== Early life and career ===
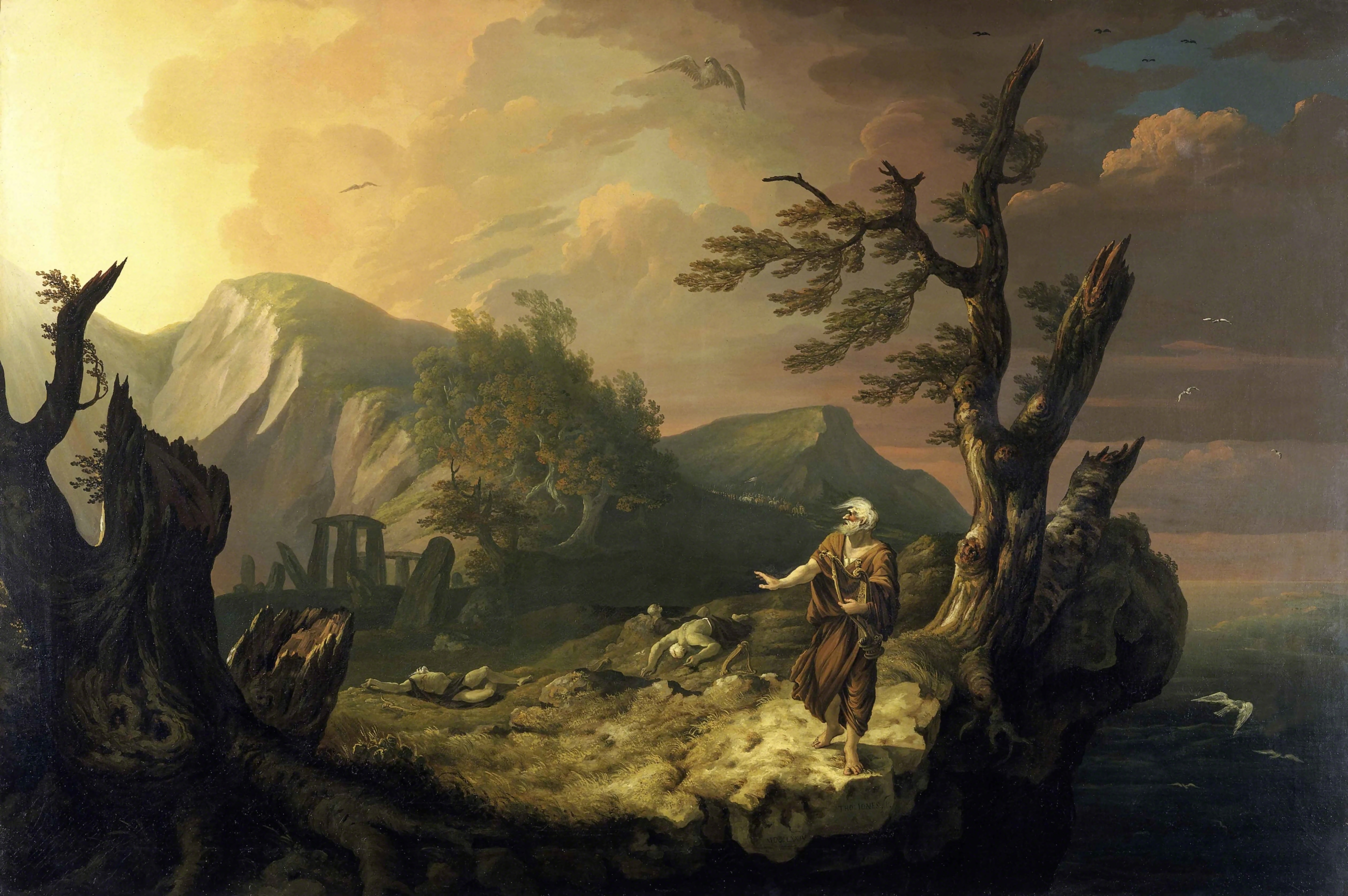
The Bard (1774). Oil on canvas, 114.5 × 168.0 cm. National Museum Cardiff

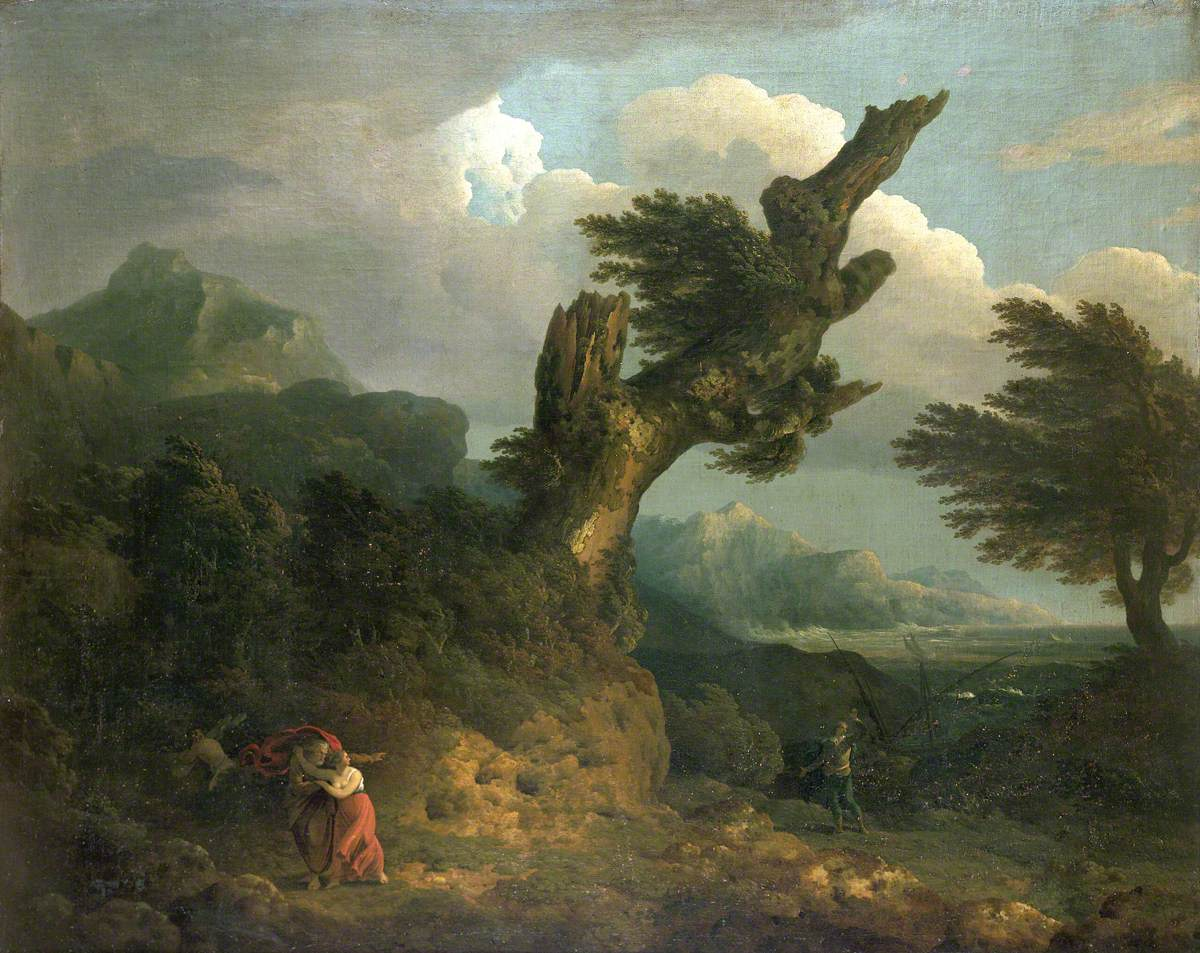
Prospero, Miranda and Caliban Spy the Shipwrecked Ferdinand (1778)

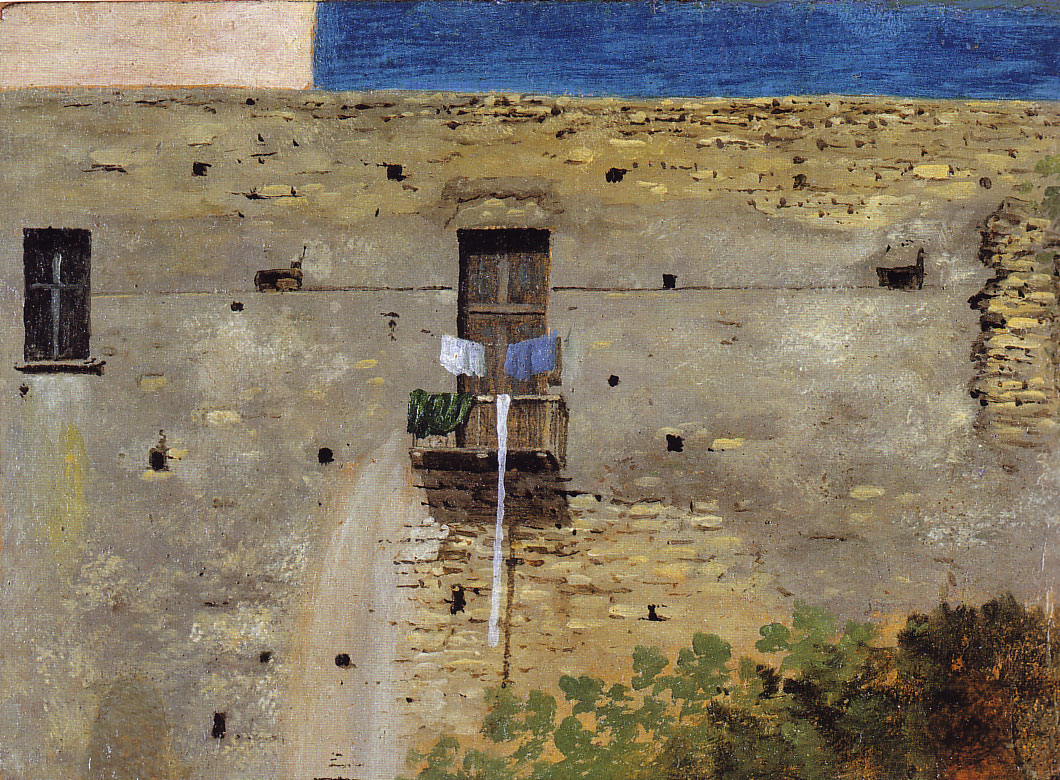
A Wall in Naples (1782). Oil on paper, 11.4 × 16 cm. National Gallery, London. One of the unprecedented small views which aroused great interest in the 20th century.

Thomas Jones was born in Trefonnen in Cefnllys, Radnorshire, the second of sixteen children to the landowner Thomas Jones of Trefonnen and his wife, Hannah. His formative years were spent on his father's estate at Pencerrig near Builth Wells; thus he is often referred to as Thomas Jones of Pencerrig to differentiate him from others of the same name. He was educated at Christ College, Brecon, and later at a school kept by Jenkin Jenkins at Llanfyllin in Montgomeryshire, before going to Oxford in 1759 to study at Jesus College. His university education was funded by a maternal uncle who, contrary to Jones's own wishes, hoped for him to enter the church. Jones dropped out of Oxford after this uncle’s death in 1761 and began to pursue his preferred career as an artist.

Jones moved to London and enrolled at William Shipley's drawing school in November 1761. Despite attending the life class at St Martin's Lane Academy, he remained unconfident of his ability to draw figures convincingly, and in 1763 he persuaded the leading landscape painter of the day (and fellow Welshman) Richard Wilson to take him on as a pupil. A high-spirited youth, Jones recorded in his journal that he and two rowdy fellow pupils were once rebuked by their master with the words, "Gentlemen, this is not the way to rival Claude".

In 1765 Jones began to exhibit at the Society of Artists (the forerunner of the Royal Academy). From 1769 onwards his landscapes began to adopt the "grand manner", becoming settings for scenes in history, literature or mythology. His frequent collaborator on these works was John Hamilton Mortimer, who painted the figures. One of his best-known works from this period is The Bard (Cardiff), based on the poem by Thomas Gray. The 1770s were a successful period for Jones; he was elected a fellow of the Society of Artists in 1771 and served as the society’s director in 1773–4. This period also saw the beginning of Jones’s unconventional habit of producing small landscape sketches in oils on paper for his own amusement.

=== Italy ===
Jones embarked on an eagerly anticipated trip to Italy in September 1776. The works produced there departed significantly from the example of his master, particularly in his watercolour paintings, where he developed a distinctive palette of varying shades of blue. Jacob More, John Robert Cozens and Thomas Banks were among the fellow expatriate artists with whom Jones was friendly. His first commission in Italy was a landscape entitled Lake Albano – Sunset for the Earl-Bishop of Derry, who became Jones's most important patron.

Jones made his first visit to Naples in September 1778, staying there for five months. He returned to Rome for a time, living in a house near the Spanish Steps built by Salvator Rosa. He took on a Danish widow called Maria Moncke as his "Maid Servant" in April 1779, eloping with her to Naples a year later. Then the largest city in Italy, Naples promised more opportunities for patronage than had Rome, and Jones sought the patronage of the British Ambassador Sir William Hamilton in particular. Maria gave birth to two daughters in Naples, Anna Maria (in 1780) and Elizabetha (in 1781).

=== Return from Italy and retirement ===
Upon hearing of his father's death in 1782, Jones, who after six years in Italy was becoming restless and homesick, returned to Britain. He set off for London with Maria, Anna and Elizabetha on a Swedish brig in August 1783. He arrived the following November only to find many of his possessions destroyed by damp, including all his painted studies from nature. In London Jones attempted to revive his career as a painter, but he had less impetus to do so as an annual income of £300 was left to him by his father. Although he exhibited ten works at the Royal Academy from 1784 to 1798, by 1785 he felt that his artistic career was over.

In his later years Jones felt increasingly himself drawn back to Wales, especially his beloved Pencerrig. He inherited the estate in 1787, on the death of his brother Major John Jones without issue. With his new-found financial security Thomas Jones finally married Maria Moncke on 16 September 1789 (though his devout mother also influenced the decision). The wedding was held at St Pancras Church in London. Jones took an active interest in his estate, using his sketchbook to record new agricultural developments. In 1791, he even wrote a poem entitled "Petraeia" about his love for Pencerrig. (Cerrig, meaning 'stone' in Welsh, translates into Greek as petra.) 1791 was also the year when he became High Sheriff of Radnorshire.

Thomas Jones died in 1803; the cause of death was angina pectoris. He was buried at the family chapel at Caebach, Llandrindod Wells.

Exhibitions dedicated to his paintings were held at Marble Hill House, Twickenham and the National Museum of Wales in 1970.

== Likenesses ==
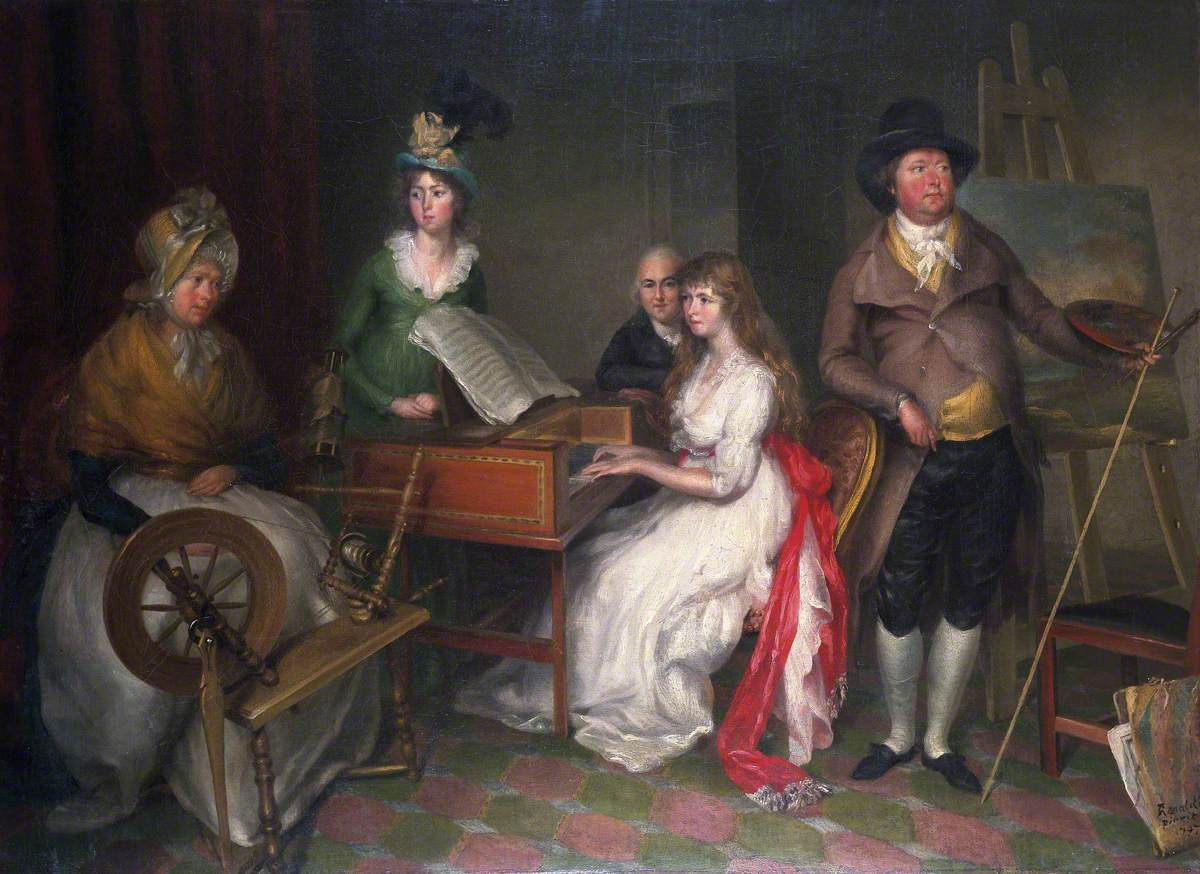
Francesco Renaldi, Thomas Jones and his Family (1797). Oil on canvas, 74.9 × 101.6 cm. National Museum Cardiff

- Giuseppe Marchi (c. 1735–1808), Portrait of Thomas Jones, 1768.
- Francesco Renaldi (1755–fl. 1798) Portrait of Thomas Jones and his Family, 1797.
