= Giovanni Balestra =

Italian engraver

Giovanni Balestra (1774–1842) was an Italian engraver.

He was born at Bassano del Grappa, and was a relative of Antonio Balestra. He studied under Antonio Suntach and attended the engraver's workshop of Count Giovanni Antonio Remondini in Bassano. In 1803, he moved to Rome. He engraved Christ and the Samaritan Woman at the Fountain after Il Garofalo; The Penitent Magdalene after Bartolomé Esteban Murillo; Madonna del Rosario after Sassoferrato; and Aurora and Cephalus after Annibale Carracci. He also made engravings of the Roman works of Antonio Canova and Bertel Thorwaldsen.

He died in Rome in 1842.

== Bibliography ==
- Bryan, Michael (1886). Robert Edmund Graves (ed.). Dictionary of Painters and Engravers, Biographical and Critical. Vol. I: A-K. London: George Bell and Sons. p. 73.
