= William Barnard (engraver) =

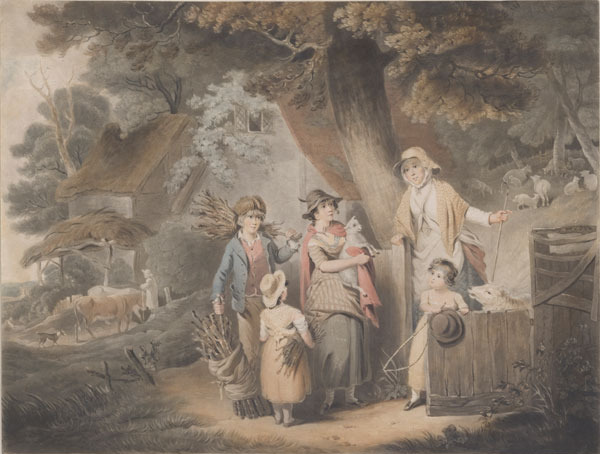
The Peasant's Integrity, by William Barnard, Pushkin Museum, 1802

William Barnard (1774–1849) was an English mezzotint engraver.

Barnard primarily lived and worked in London. He made a series of engravings of Lord Nelson. He also made other types of engraving, for example for a grocer, that were frankly promotional. One of those was for the "Golden Lane Genuine Brewery", after Dean Wolstenholme Sr.

After 1829, for a period, Barnard was a designated Keeper of the British Institution. According to Thomas Uwins, he was in charge of hanging exhibitions there. He died 11 November 1849.
