= Johann Georg Primavesi =

German painter (1774–1855)

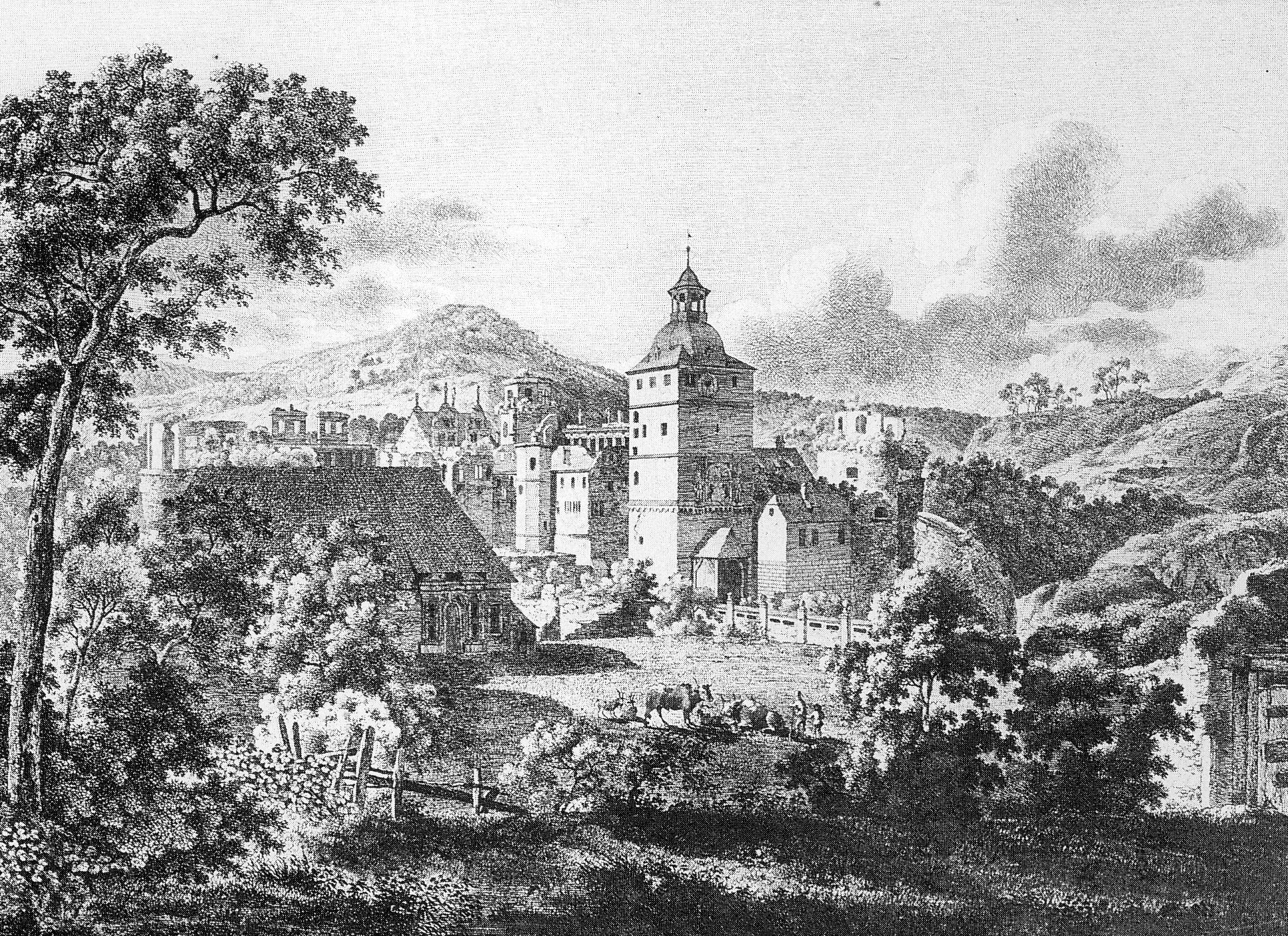
Heidelberg Castle by Johann Georg Primavesi,1803

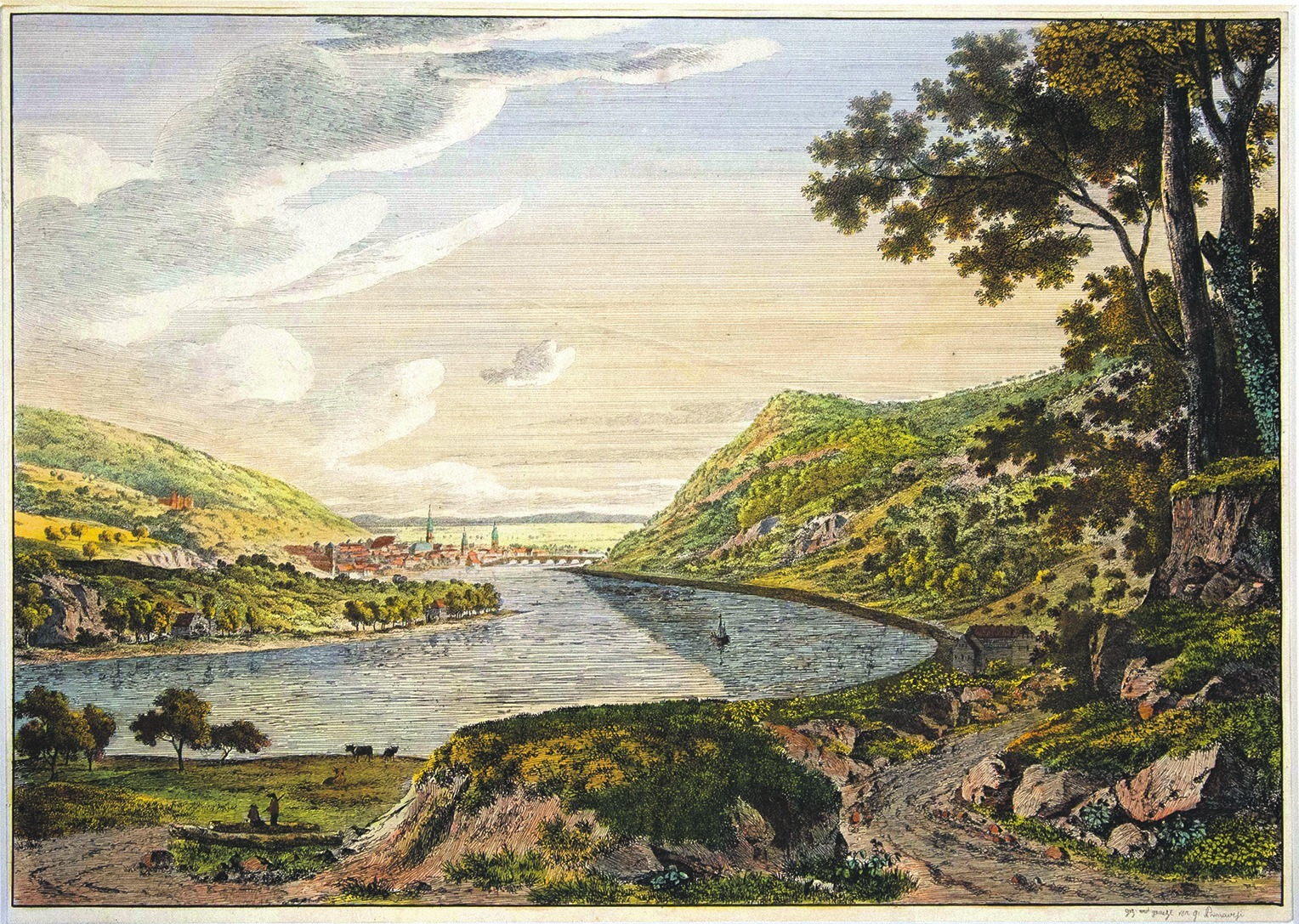
View of Heidelberg by Johann Georg Primavesi

Johann Georg Primavesi (1774–1855) was a German etcher and painter, primarily of landscapes.

Primavesi was born in Heidelberg. In 1812, he became a theatrical painter in Mannheim. He was dissatisfied with the artistic possibilities offered there, however, so moved to the royal theatre in Darmstadt. Though well paid, his finances deteriorated; from 1815, he split work with another painter, Sandhaas, and in 1817, he suffered a fire at his house. During this period, he took up a correspondence with Goethe. However, his fortunes were restored in 1822, as he was appointed to a secure position as court painter in Kassel, where he remained until his death in 1855.
