= 1762 in art =

Events from the year 1762 in art.

== Events ==
- The Trevi Fountain in Rome is completed after thirty years of work, with Nicola Salvi's design being modified by Giovanni Paolo Panini.
- The equestrian statue of King Louis XV of France in the Place de la Concorde, Paris, is completed after around a dozen years, with Edmé Bouchardon's design being finished by Jean-Baptiste Pigalle; however, it will be destroyed during the French Revolution.
- The art collection of Joseph Smith, former British consul in Venice, including many works by Canaletto, is sold to King George III of Great Britain for the Royal Collection.
- James Stuart and Nicholas Revett's Antiquities of Athens is published.
- Horace Walpole begins publication of Anecdotes of Painting in England, based on George Vertue's manuscript notes.
- The Exhibition of 1762 is held by the Society of Artists of Great Britain at Pall Mall in London

== Paintings ==
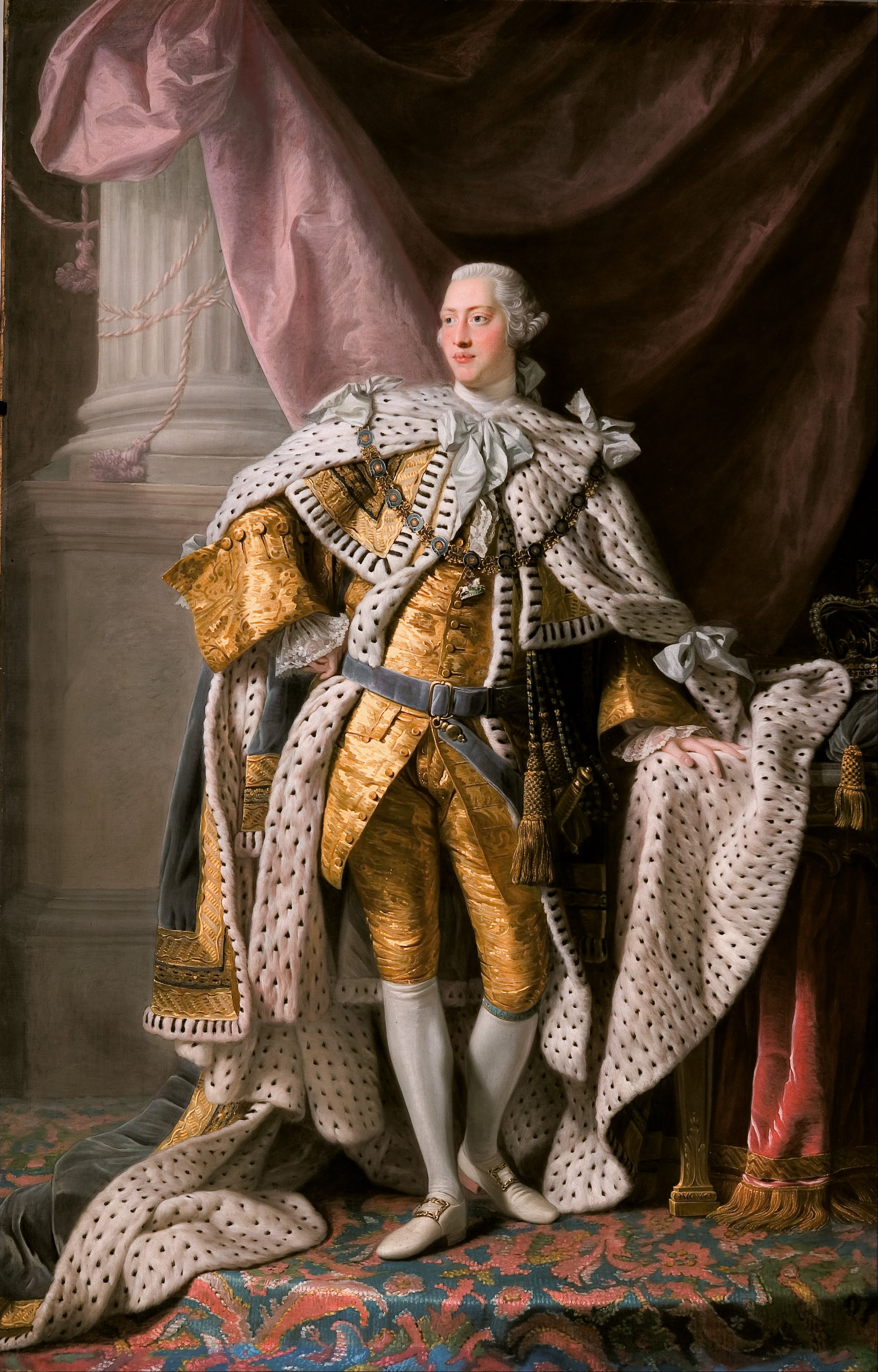
Allan Ramsay, Portrait of George III.

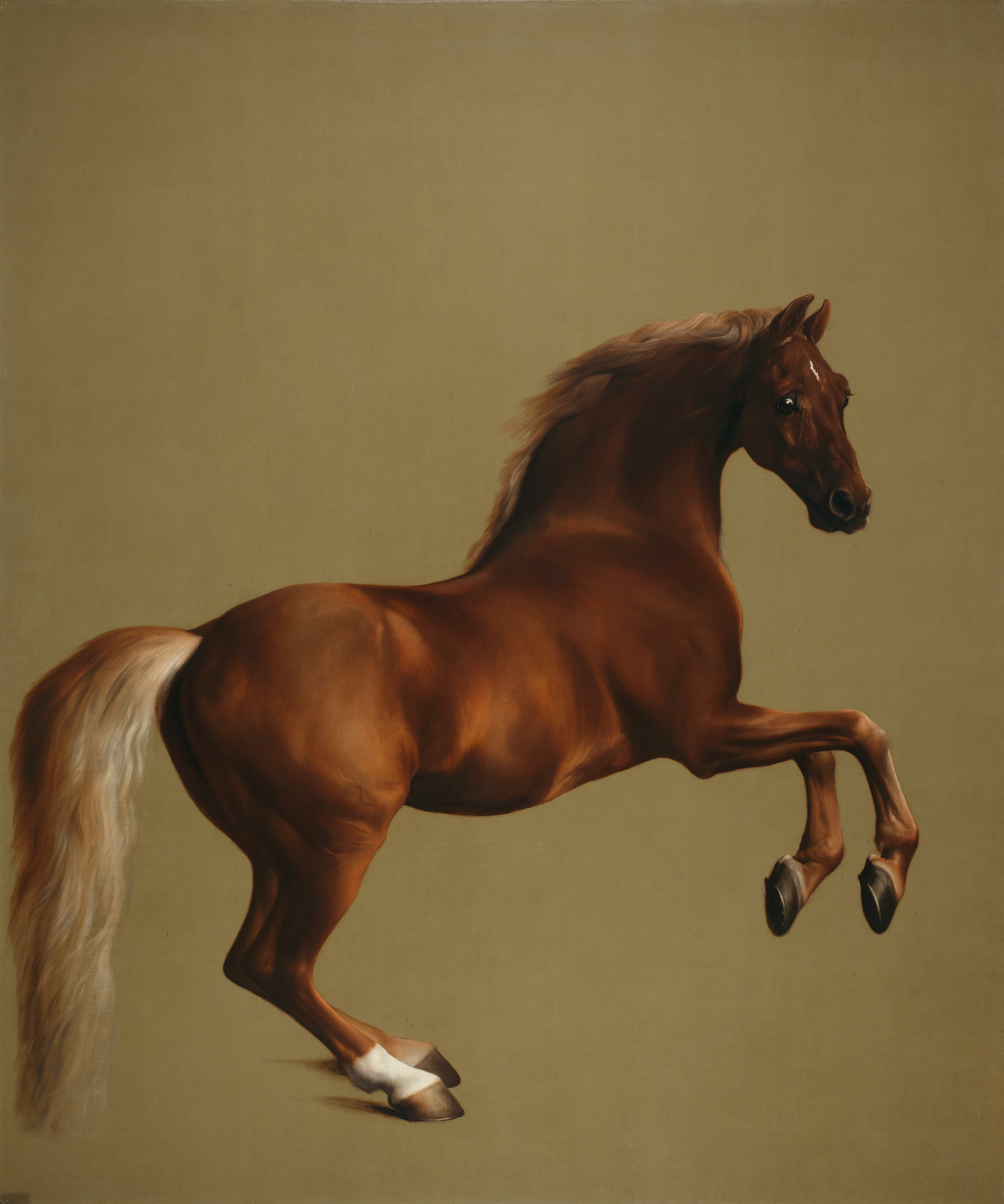
Stubbs, Whistlejacket

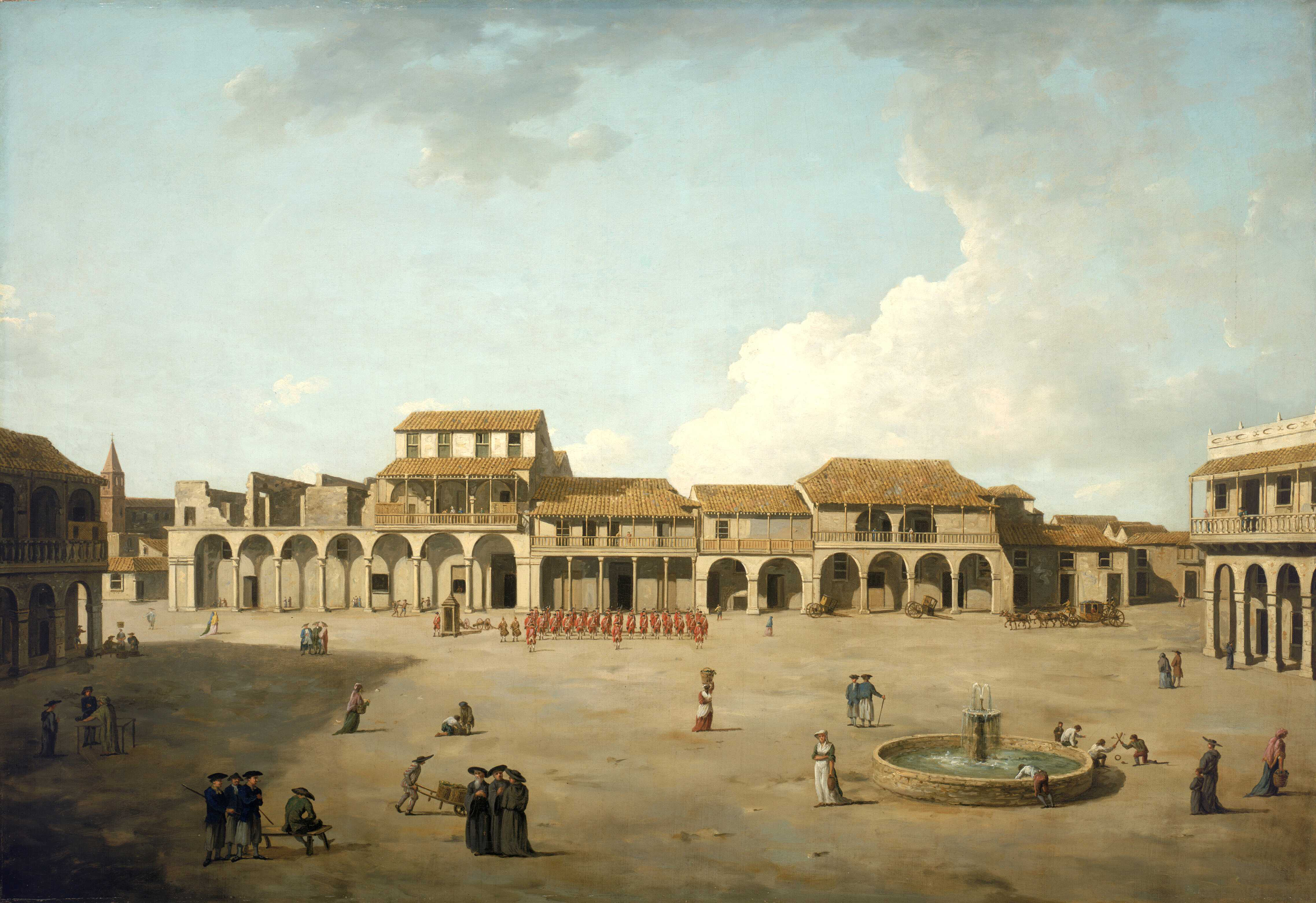
Dominic Serres, The Piazza at Havana.

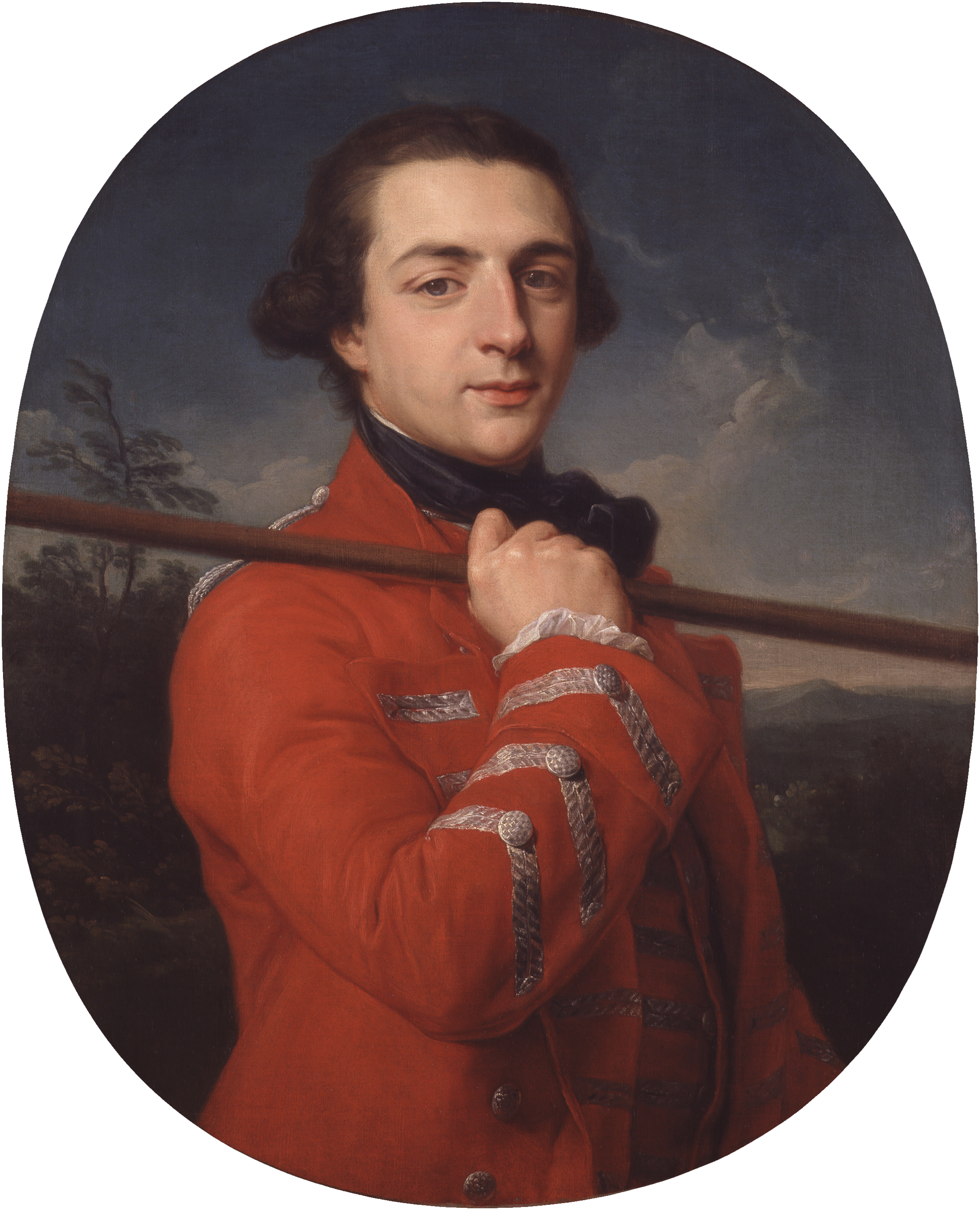
Pompeo Batoni, Portrait of the Duke of Grafton.

- Pompeo Batoni – Portrait of the Duke of Grafton
- Thomas Davies – An East View of the Great Cataract of Niagara
- François-Hubert Drouais – Portrait of Dmitry Mikhaylovich Golitsyn
- Thomas Gainsborough
  - Portrait of Lady Alston
  - Portrait of Sir Edward Turner
- Nathaniel Hone – Portrait of Lieutenant-General the Hon Philip Sherard and Captain William Tiffin at the Battle of Brücke-Mühl
- William Marlow – Blackfriars Bridge and St Paul's Cathedral
- Allan Ramsay
  - Coronation Portrait of George III
  - Coronation Portrait of Queen Charlotte
  - Countess of Elgin
- Joshua Reynolds – Portraits of Sir Charles Spencer; the Earl of Shaftesbury; Emma, Lady Edgcumbe; and Ostenaco, Mankiller of Keowee
  - Portrait of Nelly O'Brien
- Dominic Serres – The Piazza at Havana
- George Stubbs (some dates approximate)
  - Lion Attacking a Horse (two versions)
  - Mare and Foals belonging to the 2nd Viscount Bolingbroke
  - Mare and Foals with an unfigured background
  - The Marquess of Rockingham's Scrub with John Singleton up
  - Molly Longlegs with a jockey
  - Scrub, a horse belonging to the Marquess of Rockingham
  - Whistlejacket
  - Whistlejacket with the head groom Mr Cobb and the two other principal stallions in the Wentworth stud
- Joseph Vernet – View of Rochefort Harbour from the Magasin des Colonies
- Richard Wilson
  - Kew Gardens: The Pagoda and Bridge
  - The Thames near Marble Hill, Twickenham
- Johann Zoffany
  - The Garden at Hampton House, with Mr and Mrs David Garrick taking tea
  - The Shakespeare Temple at Hampton House, with Mr and Mrs David Garrick

== Births ==
- February 29 – Eberhard Wächter, painter (died 1852)
- June 16 – Giuseppe Bernardino Bison, Italian painter, especially of history pieces, genre depictions, and whimsical and imaginary landscapes (died 1844)
- August 10 – Arthur William Devis – English portrait and historical painter (died 1822)
- October 4 – William Sawrey Gilpin, watercolour painter (died 1843)
- December 30 – John Emes, British engraver and water-colour painter (died 1810)
- date unknown
  - Pierre-Michel Alix, French engraver (died 1817)
  - James Bisset, Scottish-born artist, manufacturer, writer, collector, art dealer and poet (died 1832)
  - Giovanni Battista Ballanti, sculptor (died 1835)
  - Vicente Calderón de la Barca, Spanish historical painter (died 1794)
  - Pietro Fontana, Italian engraver (died 1837)
  - Anna Rajecka, Polish painter and drawing artist (died 1832)
  - Francesco Rosaspina, Italian engraver (died 1841)
  - Jan Rustem, Turkish-born portrait painter (died 1835)
  - William Frederick Wells, English watercolour painter and etcher (died 1836)

== Deaths ==
- January 11 – Louis-François Roubiliac, French sculptor (born 1695)
- April 2 – Johann Georg Bergmüller, painter of frescoes (born 1688)
- July 16 – Giovanni Francesco Braccioli, Italian painter, mainly active in Ferrara (born 1698)
- July 20 – Paul Troger, Austrian painter, draughtsman and printmaker of the late Baroque period (born 1698)
- July 27 – Edmé Bouchardon, French sculptor (born 1698)
- August 31 – Pietro Rotari, Italian painter of portraits and altarpieces (born 1707)
- October 22 – Karl Aigen, German painter, master painter/tutor with Daniel Gran in Vienna (born 1684)
- November 18 – Agostino Veracini, Italian painter and engraver (born 1689)
- date unknown
  - Joseph Antony Adolph, Moravian painter (born 1729)
  - Jean-Baptiste Gilles, French painter of portraits in miniature and water-colours (born 1680)
  - Andreas Møller, Danish portrait painter and pioneer of miniature painting (born 1684)
  - Lars Pinnerud, Norwegian farmer and woodcarver (born 1700)
