= 1684 in art =

Events from the year 1684 in art.

== Paintings ==
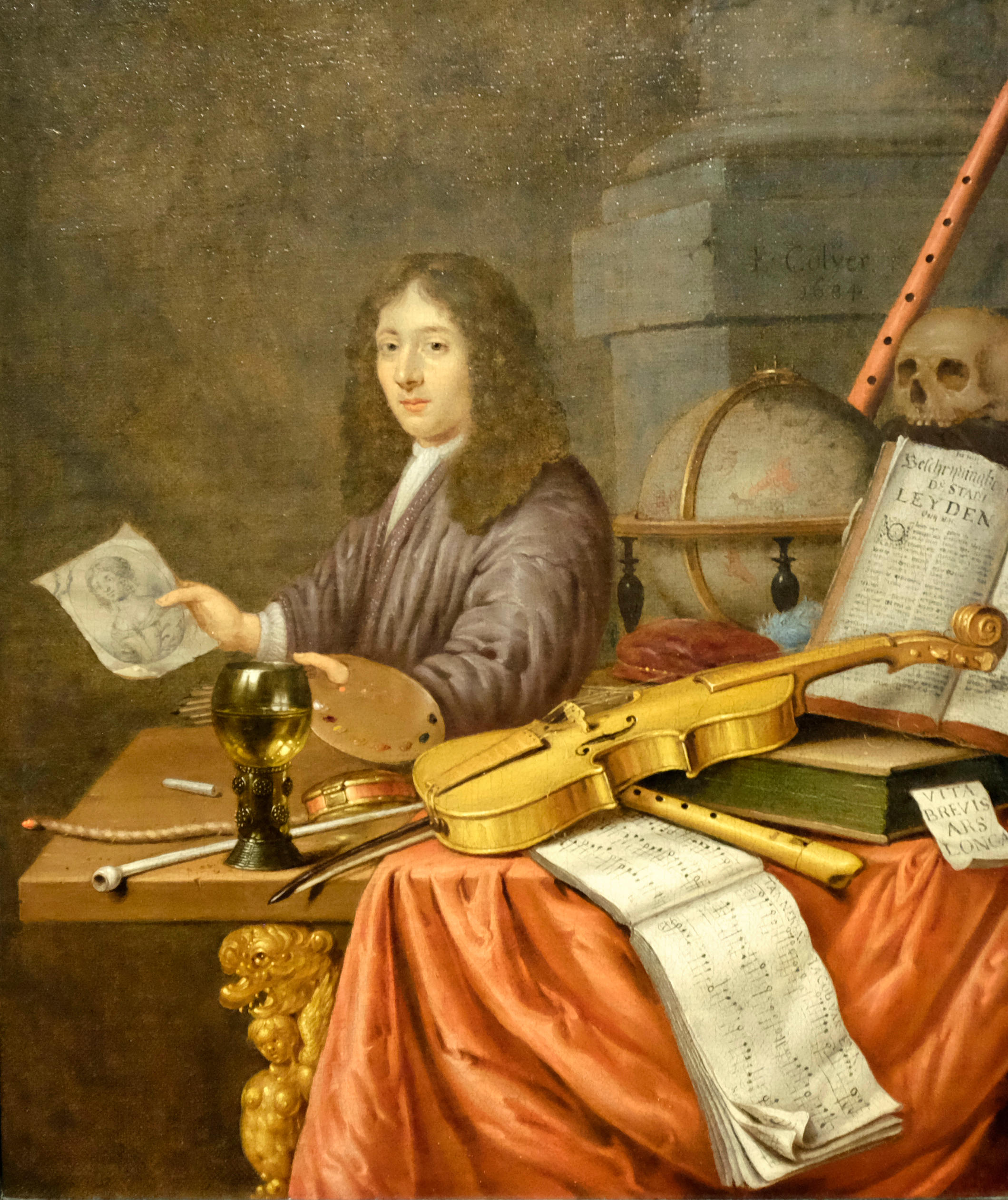
Collier - Self-Portrait

- Giovanni Antonio Burrini – Virgin with Saints Petronius and Dionysus the Areopagite
- Evert Collier – Self-Portrait with a Vanitas Still-life
- Englebert Fisen – The Crucifixion (St Bartholomew's Church, Liège)
- Aert de Gelder – The Jewish Bride (Esther Bedecked)
- Cornelis Dusart – Village Feast
- Godfrey Kneller – Portrait of James II of England
- Fa Ruozhen – Cloudy Mountains
- Willem van de Velde the Elder – The first battle of Schooneveld, 7 June 1673 (approximate date)

== Births ==
- January 14 – Jean-Baptiste van Loo, Dutch painter (died 1745)
- April 25 – Marco Benefial, Italian, proto-Neoclassical painter, mainly active in Rome (died 1764)
- October 10 – Antoine Watteau, French painter (died 1721)
- November 30 – Andreas Møller, Danish portrait painter and pioneer of miniature painting (died 1762)

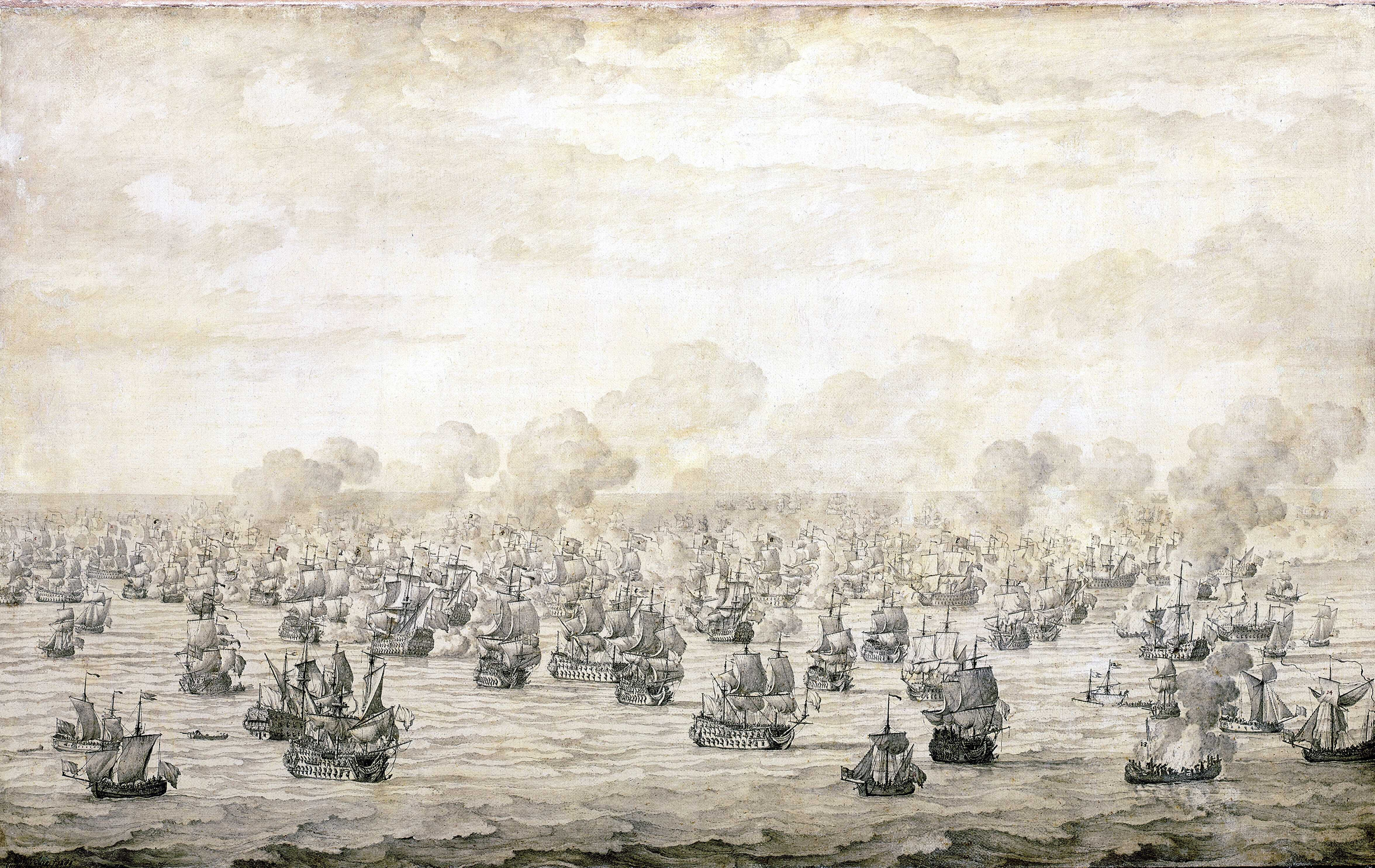
van de Velde - The first battle of Schooneveld, 7 June 1673

- date unknown
  - Karl Aigen, German painter, master painter/tutor with Daniel Gran in Vienna (died 1762)
  - George Bickham the Elder, English writing master and engraver (died 1758)
  - Giovanni Angelo Borroni, Italian painter of the late-Baroque and early-Neoclassic periods, active mainly in Milan (died 1772)
  - Serafino Brizzi, Italian engraver of the Baroque period (died 1724)
  - Bian Shoumin, Chinese painter in Qing Dynasty (died 1752)
  - Hendrik Frans van Lint, landscape painter from the Southern Netherlands (died 1763)
  - George Vertue, English engraver and antiquary (died 1756)
  - Odoardo Vicinelli, Italian painter of the late-Baroque period (died 1755)
- probable – Peter Tillemans, Flemish baroque painter, especially of portraiture, landscapes, and works on sporting and military subjects (died 1734)

== Deaths ==
- January 15 – Caspar Netscher, Dutch portrait and genre works painter (born 1639)
- January 24 (buried) – Jan Wijnants, Dutch painter (born 1632)
- February 21 – Pieter van Abeele, Dutch medallist and coiner in Amsterdam (born 1608)
- March – Pieter de Hooch, Dutch painter (born 1629)
- April 26 – Jan Davidszoon de Heem, Dutch painter (born 1606)
- July 2 – Josefa de Óbidos, Spanish-born Portuguese painter (born 1630)
- October – Gerrit Battem, Dutch landscape painter (born 1636)
- probable
  - Claude Audran the Younger, French painter (born 1639)
  - Pietro Paolo Baldini, Italian painter (born 1614)
  - Giovanni Battista Carlone, Italian painter active mainly in Genoa (born 1603)
  - Muyan, Chinese Chan monk and calligrapher (born 1611)
  - Abraham Myra, Finnish painter (born 1639)
