= Calderón de la Barca =

Calderón de la Barca may refer to:

- Ángel Calderón de la Barca y Belgrano (1790–1861), Spanish diplomat
- Carlos Calderón de la Barca (1934–2012), Mexican footballer
- Fernando Calderón de la Barca, 1st Marquis of Reinosa (1811–1890), Spanish noble and politician
- Frances Erskine Inglis, Marquesa of Calderón de la Barca, best known as Fanny Calderón de la Barca (1804–1882), Scottish-born, second wife of Ángel
- Pedro Calderón de la Barca (1600–1681), Spanish dramatist
- Saturnino Calderón de la Barca y Collantes (1799–1864), Spanish noble and politician
- Vicente Calderón de la Barca (1762–1794), Spanish painter
