= Andreas Brünniche =

Danish painter

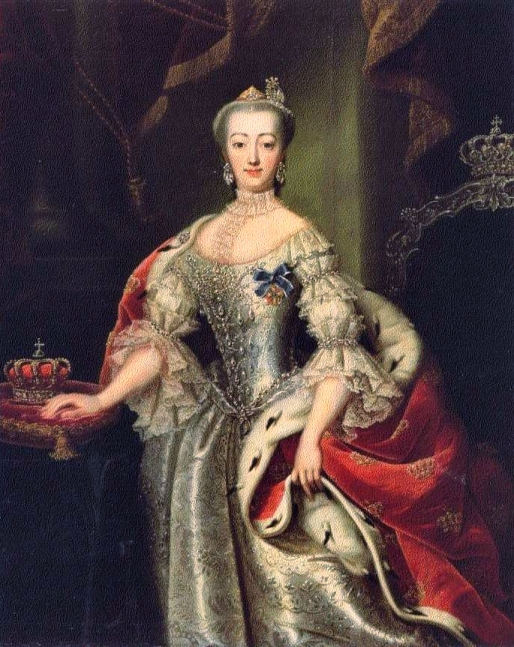
Sophie Magdalene, Queen of Denmark-Norway by Brunniche, c. 1740

Andreas Pedersen Brünniche (4 April 1704 – 4 November 1769) was a Danish painter who specialised in portrait painting.

== Biography ==
Andreas Brünniche was the son of Peder Jacobsen Brünniche and Anne Marensdatter. He came to Copenhagen, where he got a job with Bendix Grodtschilling the Younger and from 1737 at Johann Salomon Wahl's workshop. As his student, he was a much sought portrait painter in the capital, but also raised customers in many other provinces. He was also influenced by baroque masters such as Andreas Møller and Balthasar Denner and by rococo style under a more mature age influenced by Johan Hörner and CG Pilo. Brünniche was a skilled colorist, his ability to convincingly reproduce the tones of the sitter's skin and individualize the people portrayed made him popular and demanded especially among the local nobility. He portrayed some of the most influential people of Denmark at the time.

On 7 June 1735, in Copenhagen, he married Margaret Hvass Thrane (17 February 1703 in Aarhus – 26 November 1762 in Copenhagen), daughter of merchant Morten Mortensen Thrane and Mette Sørensdatter Lyngbye. He fathered zoologist Morten Thrane Brünnich and painter Peter Brünniche.

Andreas Brünniche is buried at the Trinitatis Church.
