= Pietro Fontana =

Pietro Fontana may refer to:

- Pietro Fontana (engraver) (1762–1837), engraver
- Pietro Fontana (sculptor) (1782–1857), sculptor
- Pietro Fontana (engineer) (early 19th century), Spoletine engineer and agronomist
- Pietro Fontana (painter) (1899–1968), abstract painter
- Pietro Fontana (athlete) (fl. 1908–1909), Italian racewalker
