= Capriccio: St Paul's and a Venetian Canal =

Painting by William Marlow

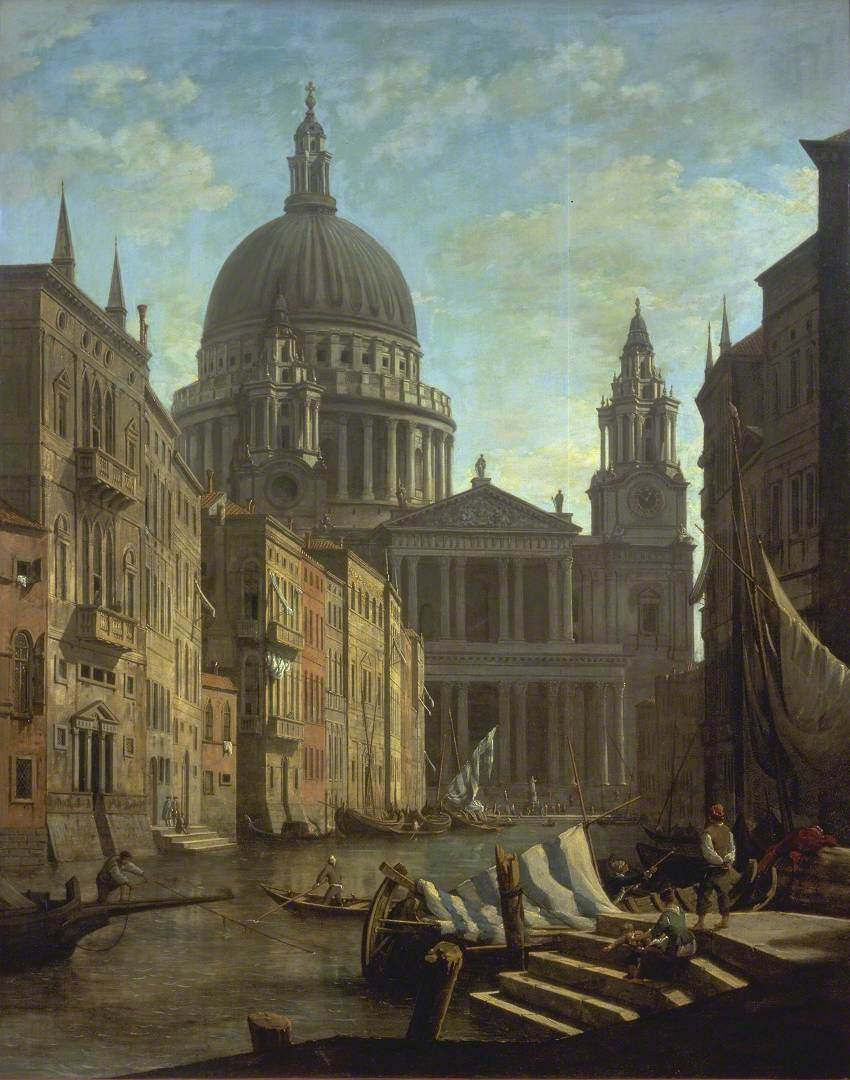
- Artist: William Marlow
- Year: c.1795
- Type: Oil on canvas, cityscape painting
- Dimensions: 129.5 cm × 104.1 cm (51.0 in × 41.0 in)
- Location: Tate Britain, London

Capriccio: St Paul's and a Venetian Canal is 1795 oil painting by the British artist William Marlow. A capriccio, it portrays an imagined scene featuring a canal in the Republic of Venice and St Paul's Cathedral in the City of London.

Marlow was a pupil of the English artist Samuel Scott who was himself influenced by the Venetian artist Canaletto. Canaletto had been a pioneer of the capriccio, which blended multiple buildings in an imagined and often contrasting view. Marlow's work was produced not long before the Fall of the Republic of Venice to the forces of the young Napoleon.

Marlow had visited Venice during his Grand Tour of Italy from 1765 to 1766. Today it is in the collection of the Tate Britain in Pimlico having been purchased in 1954.

== Bibliography ==
- Black, Jeremy. Italy and the Grand Tour. Yale University Press, 2003.
- Dyos, Harold James & Wolff, Michael. The Victorian City: Images and Realities, Volume 2. Taylor & Francis, 1999.
- Gephardt, Katarina. The Idea of Europe in British Travel Narratives, 1789-1914. Routledge, 2016.
- Steil, Lucien. The Architectural Capriccio: Memory, Fantasy and Invention. Ashgate Publishing, 2014.
