= Portrait of Lady Alston =

1762 painting by Thomas Gainsborough

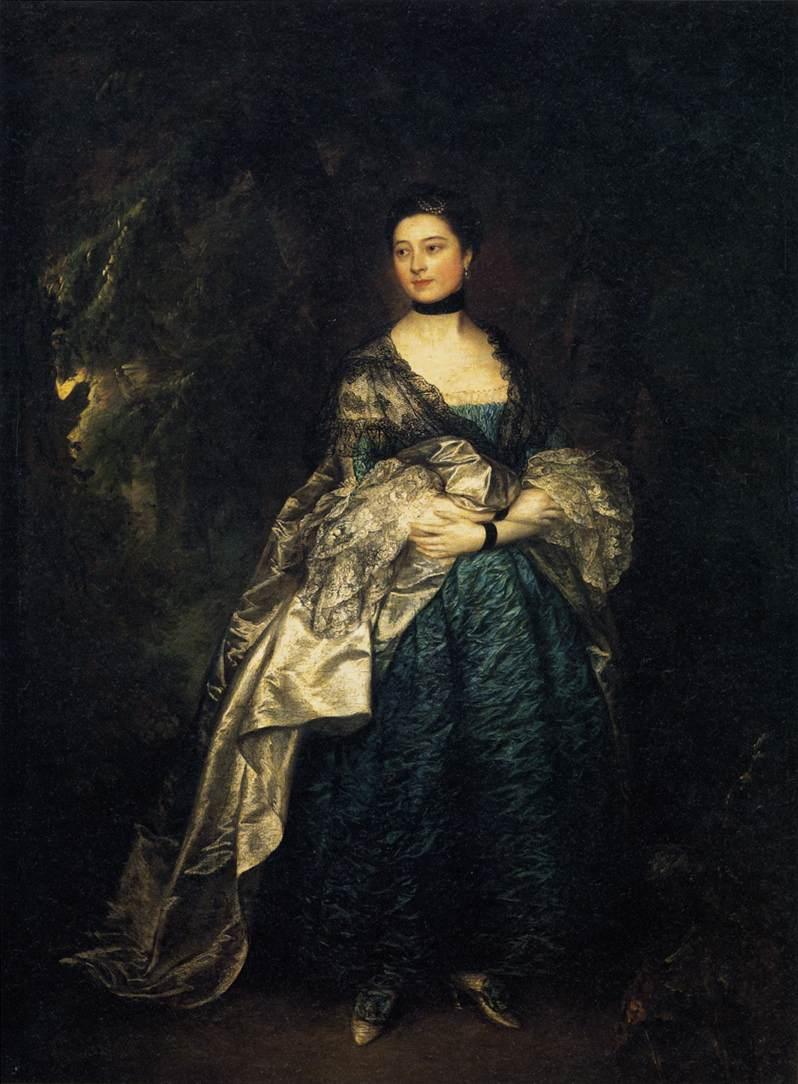
- Artist: Thomas Gainsborough
- Year: 1762
- Type: Oil on canvas, portrait painting
- Dimensions: 228 cm × 166 cm (90 in × 65 in)
- Location: Louvre, Paris

Portrait of Lady Alston is an oil on canvas portrait painting by the British artist Thomas Gainsborough, from 1762. It features Anne, Lady Alston. It is held in the Louvre, in Paris.

== History and description ==
The subject was Lady Alston, the wife of the John Alston II, whom she married in 1753, and who subsequently inherited his elder brother's baronetcy. At the time, Gainsborough was an established portraitist of High Society based in the British spa town of Bath. He depicts her at full-length in the fashionable costume of the mid Georgian era. Her stance appears to be inspired by a seventeenth century depiction of Lady Anne Clifford by Anthony van Dyck. Gainsborough's painting appeared at the British Institution exhibition in London in 1862. Today, it is in the collection of the Louvre, having been offered by the Rothschild family in 1947.

== Bibliography ==
- Bryant, Julius (2003) [Originally published 1990]. Kenwood: Catalogue of Paintings in the Iveagh Bequest. Norway: Yale University Press. ISBN 978-0-300-10206-2.
- Hamilton, James. Gainsborough: A Portrait. Hachette UK, 2017.
