= Blackfriars Bridge and St Paul's Cathedral =

Painting by William Marlow

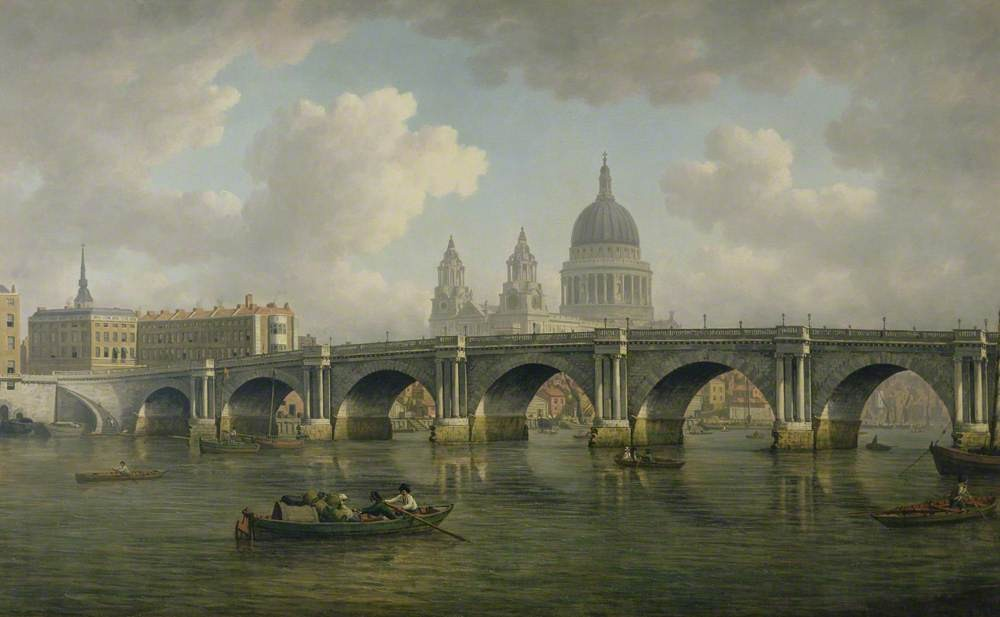
- Artist: William Marlow
- Year: c.1762
- Type: Oil on canvas, cityscape painting
- Dimensions: 104 cm × 168 cm (41 in × 66 in)
- Location: Guildhall Art Gallery; London

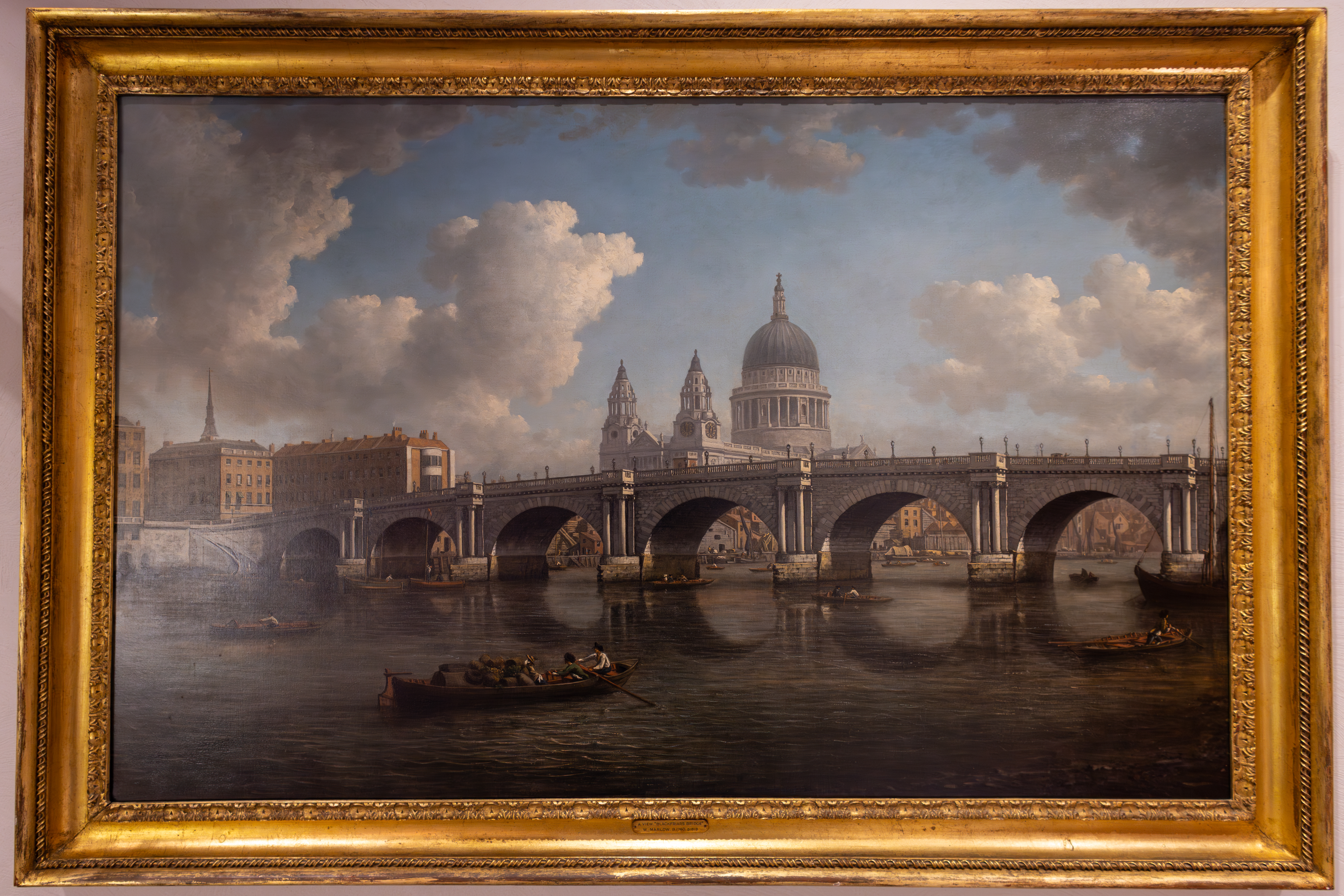
Variation of the painting at Leathersellers' Hall, London

Blackfriars Bridge and St Paul's Cathedral is a landscape painting by the British artist William Marlow, sometimes dated as c.1762. A riverscape and veduta it depicts a view in London of Blackfriars Bridge with St Paul's Cathedral towering behind it. Seen from the south bank of the River Thames it shows Blackfriars Bridge, the third bridge to be built in the city following London Bridge and Westminster Bridge. Although the bridge wasn't fully opened until 1769, the painting depicts the Portland Stone arches built to an Italianate architecture design of the architect Robert Mylne. At the northern end of the bridge is St Martin, Ludgate in New Bridge Street. A wherry is seen in the foreground, conveying passengers downriver.

Born in Southwark, Marlow was a student of Samuel Scott and his work echoed both Scott and Canaletto's paintings of London. Today it is in the collection of the Guildhall Art Gallery, having been acquired in 1975. Marlow produced several variations of the scene over a number of years, with one dated from 1788.

== Bibliography ==
- Cubitt, Geoffrey. Imagining Nations. Manchester University Press, 1998.
- Novak, Maximillian E. The Age of Projects. University of Toronto Press, 2008.
- Roe, Sonia & Hardy, Pat. Oil Paintings in Public Ownership in the City of London. Public Catalogue Foundation, 2009.
- Waterhouse, Ellis. Painting in Britain, 1530 to 1790. Yale University Press, 1994.
- Watson, Wilbur J. Great Bridges: From Ancient Times to the Twentieth Century. Courier Corporation, 2013.
