= Serafino Brizzi =

Italian engraver

Serafino Brizzi (1684–1724) was an Italian engraver of the Baroque period, active in Bologna. He is believed to have trained with Ferdinando Galli-Bibiena. He was also called Briccio or Brizio.

== Bibliography ==
- Ticozzi, Stefano (1830). Dizionario degli architetti, scultori, pittori, intagliatori in rame ed in pietra, coniatori di medaglie, musaicisti, niellatori, intarsiatori d'ogni età e d'ogni nazione' (Volume 1). Milan: Gaetano Schiepatti. p. 222.
