= William Marlow =

English painter

William Marlow (1740 – 14 January 1813) was an English landscape and marine painter and etcher.

== Life ==
Marlow was born in Southwark, London. He spent five years as a pupil of the marine painter Samuel Scott, and also studied at the St. Martin's Lane Academy.

He became a member of the Incorporated Society of Artists, and from the Exhibition of 1762 to 1764 contributed to their exhibitions in Spring Gardens. He was employed in painting views of country houses. From 1765 to 1768, on the advice of the Duchess of Northumberland, he travelled in France and Italy. On his return to London he took up residence in Leicester Square, and renewed his contributions to the Society of Artists, of which was made a Fellow in 1771. In 1788 he moved to Twickenham, and began to exhibit at the Royal Academy, where he showed regularly until 1796, and then again, for the last time, in 1807, when he exhibited Twickenham Ferry by Moonlight.

He died in Twickenham on 14 January 1813.

== Work ==
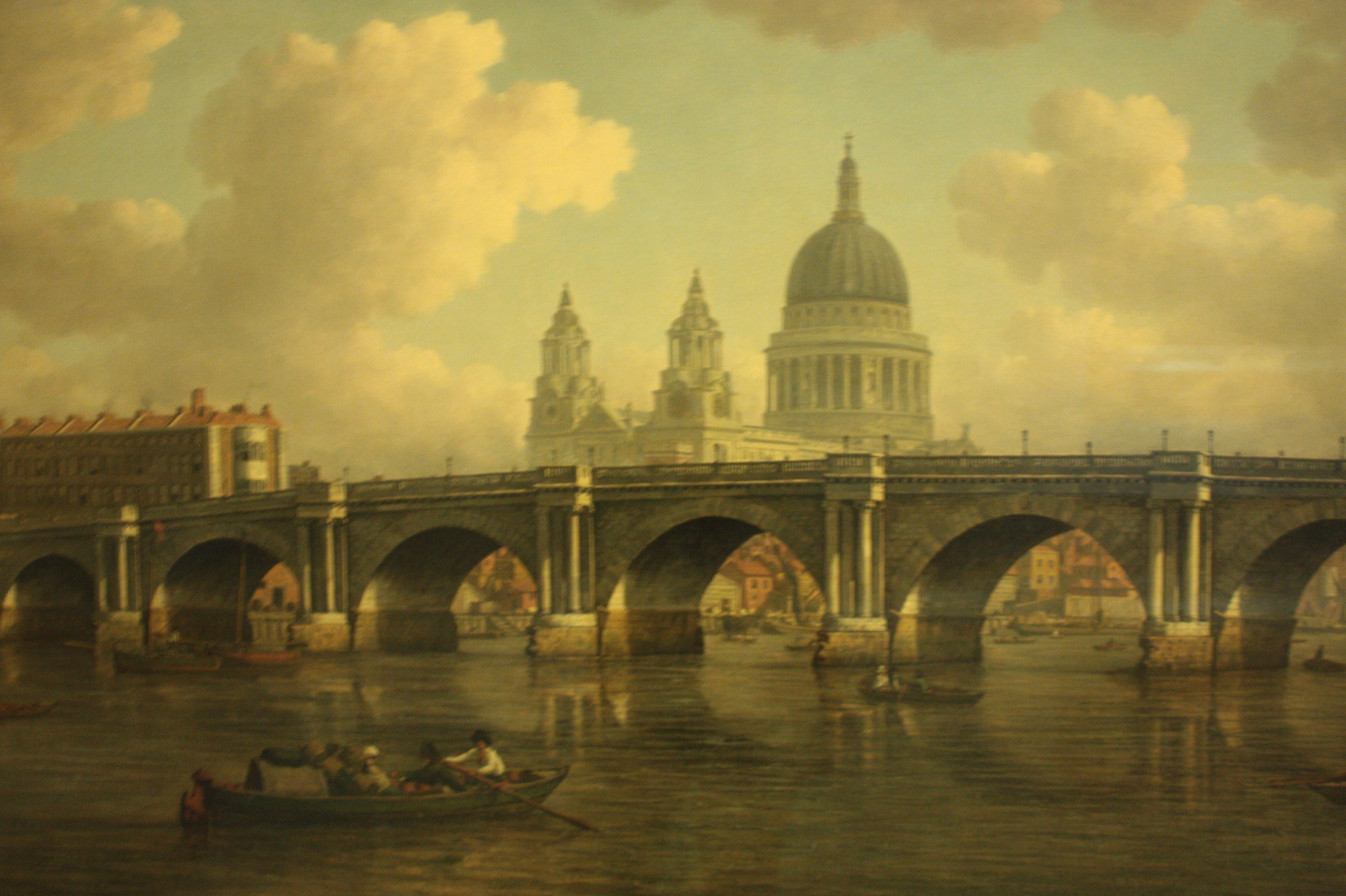
Blackfriars Bridge and St Paul's Cathedral, by William Marlow, 1788, Guildhall Gallery, London

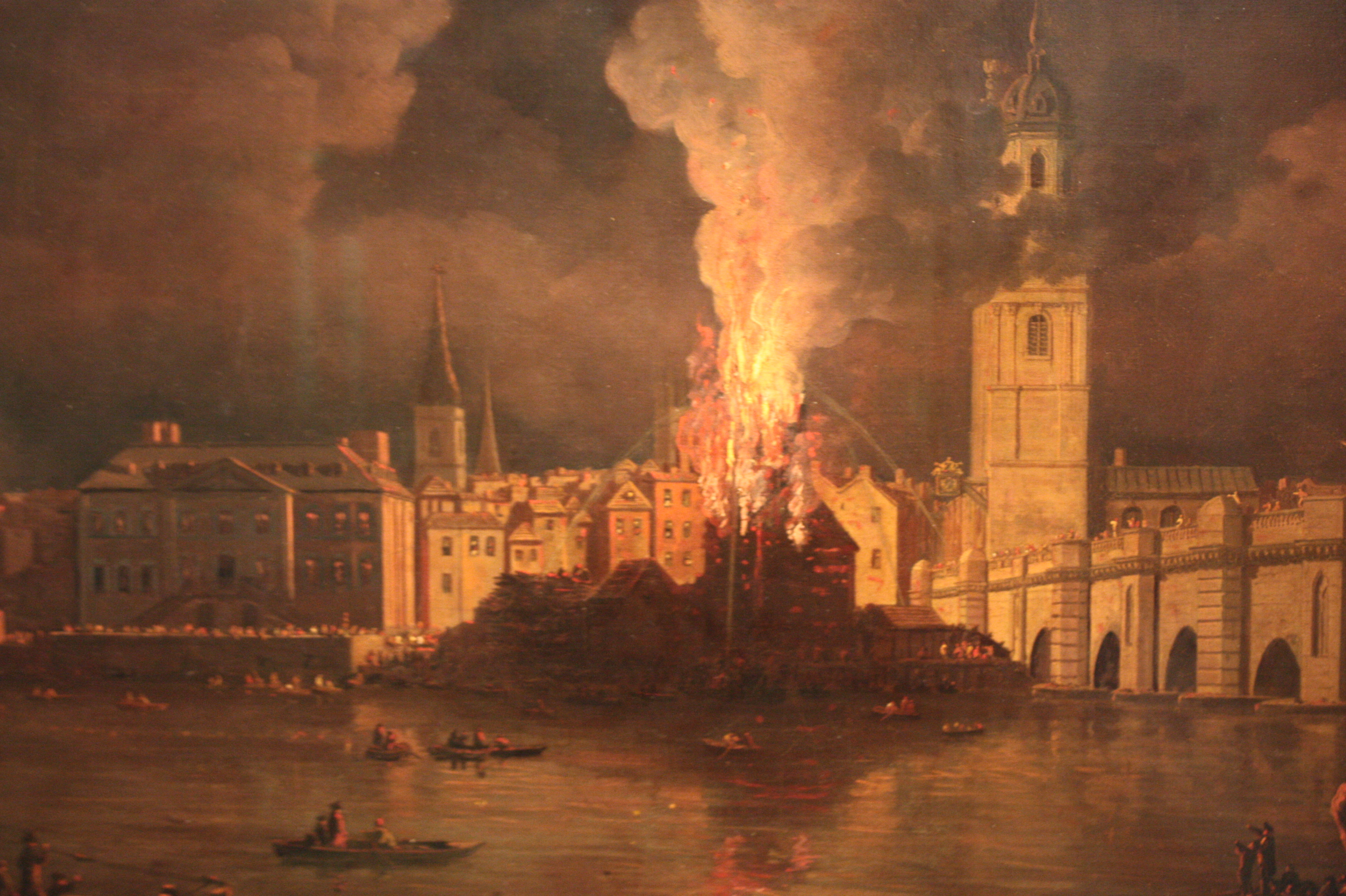
The Waterworks at London Bridge on Fire, 1779, by William Marlow, Guildhall Gallery, London

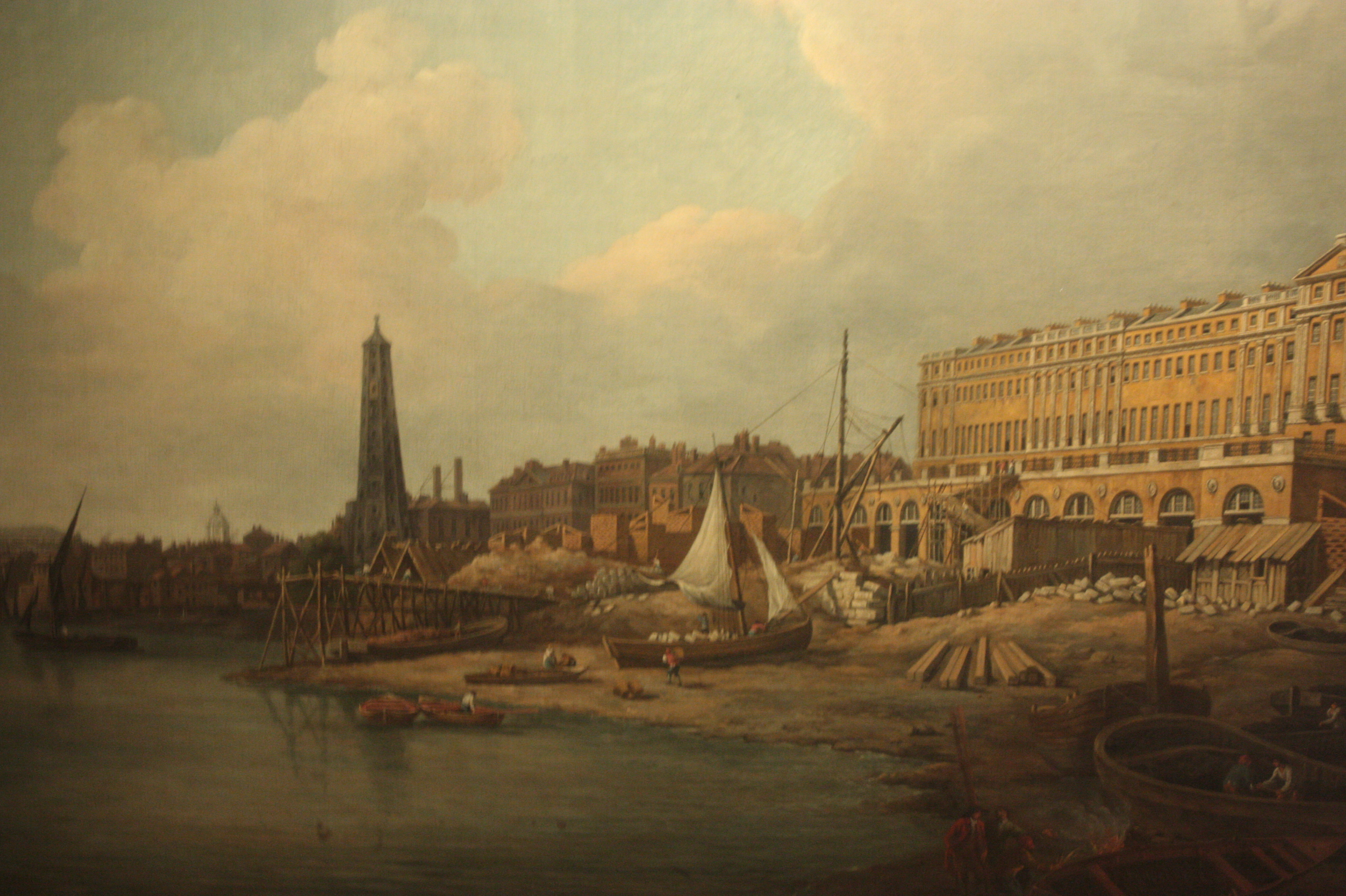
Westminster waterfront by William Marlow, 1771

Marlow painted in both oils and watercolours, and drew marine and landscape scenes. He was influenced by Richard Wilson and Canaletto. According to one critic, "his drawings are graceful but of no great power, and his method in water-colour did not advance beyond tinting", and "he realised a moderate competence". Another writer commented, "his watercolours are rather feeble in the stained manner, but his views of the Thames are truthful and delicate in colour".

His subjects were generally British country scenes, but he painted some pictures from his Italian sketches, and etched some of the latter, as well as some views on the Thames. His views of the bridges at Westminster and Blackfriars in London were engraved.

Marlow contributed to an album of watercolours illustrating William Chambers's designs for buildings and improvements at Kew Gardens. In 1763 the pictures were engraved and published in a volume entitled Plans, Elevations, Sections and Perspective Views of the Gardens and Buildings of Kew in Surrey, the Seat of Her Royal Highness, the Princess Dowager of Wales. In 1795 his former pupil, John Curtis, published a set of six Italian views by Marlow.

In an oil painting entitled Capriccio: St Paul's and a Venetian Canal (c.1795), now in the collection of the Tate Gallery, Marlow created an architectural fantasy in which Wren's cathedral was transferred to the Italian city.

Marlow exhibited a total of 152 works – 125 at the Society of Artists, two at the Free Society of Artists, and 25 at the Royal Academy.

Much of Marlow's work is to be found in the Government Art Collection and Tate Gallery in London, and some in regional galleries in Britain including Derby Art Gallery.

== Gallery ==
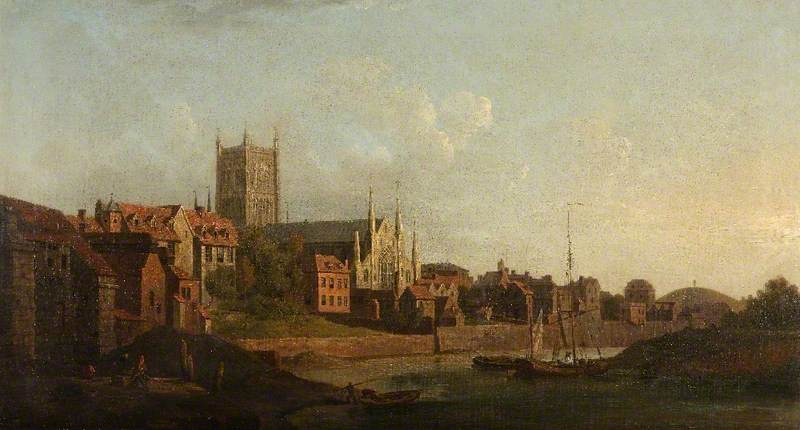
Worcester from the Severn, 1760

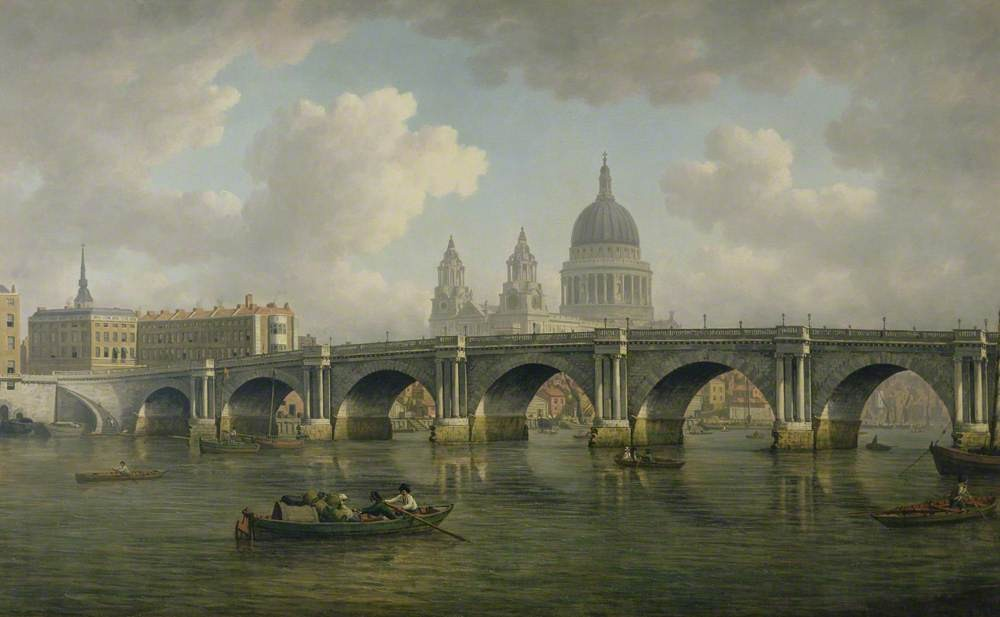
Blackfriars Bridge and St Paul's Cathedral, c.1762

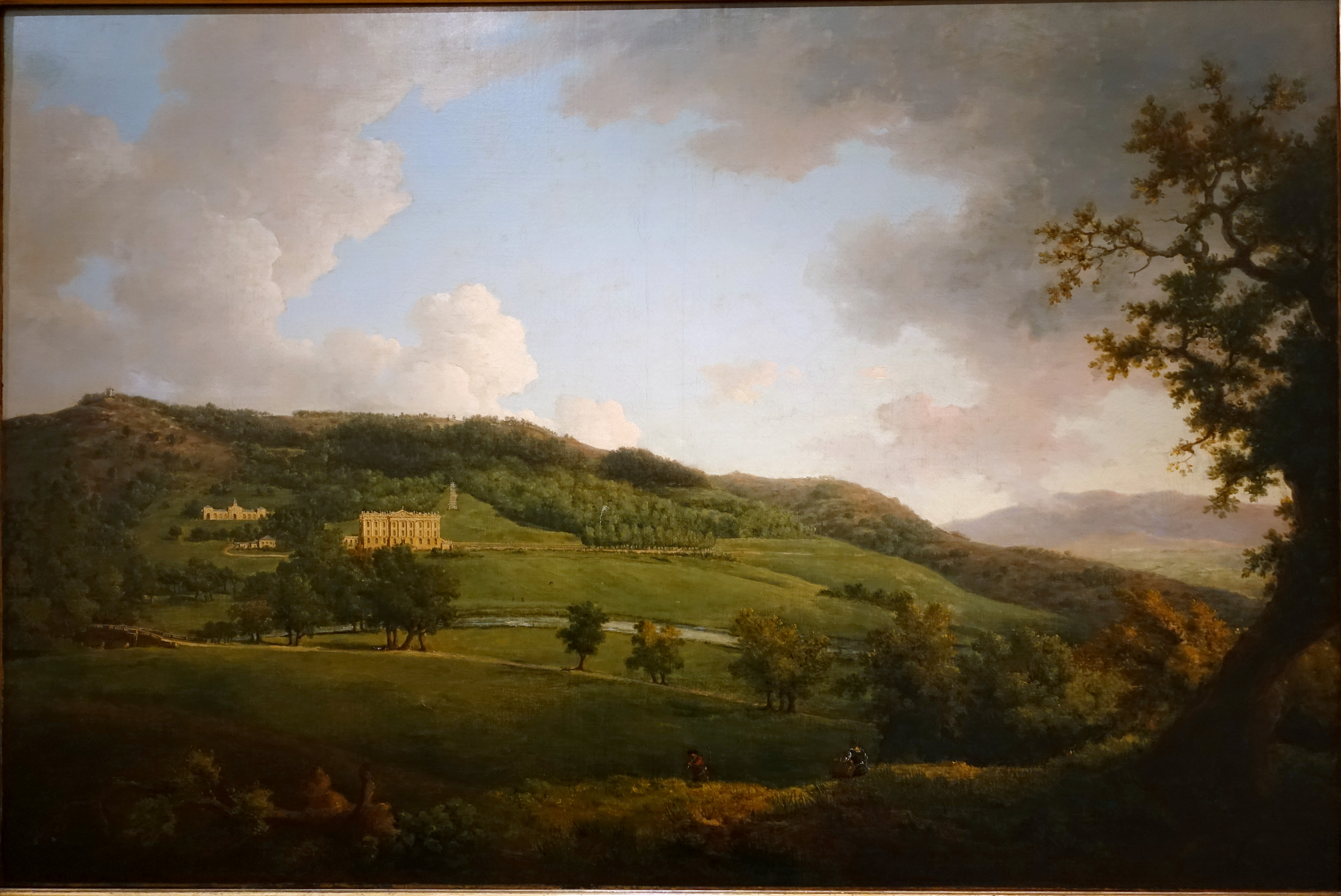
A View of Chatsworth House, 1770

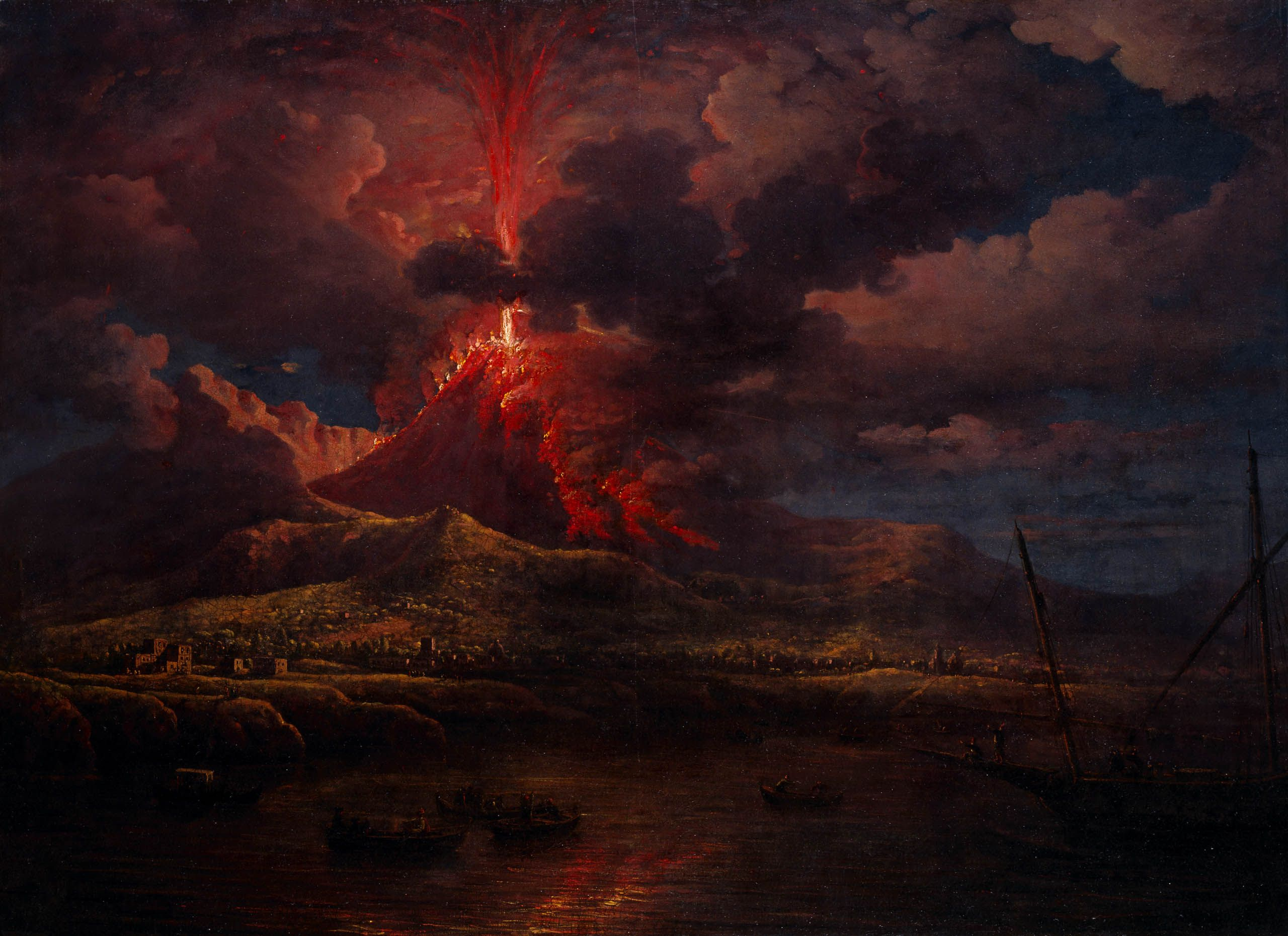
Vesuvius Erupting at Night, 1768

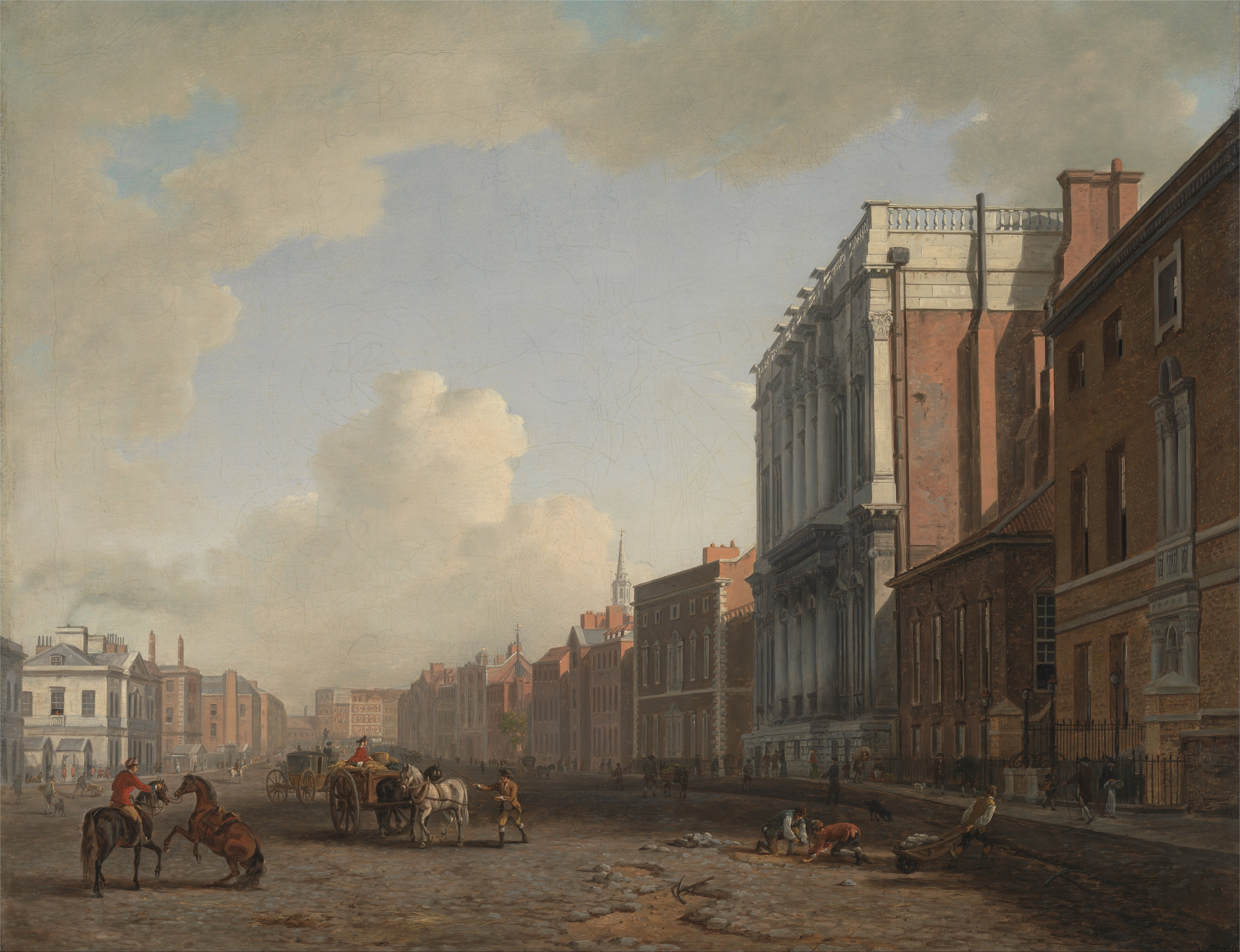
Whitehall, 1775

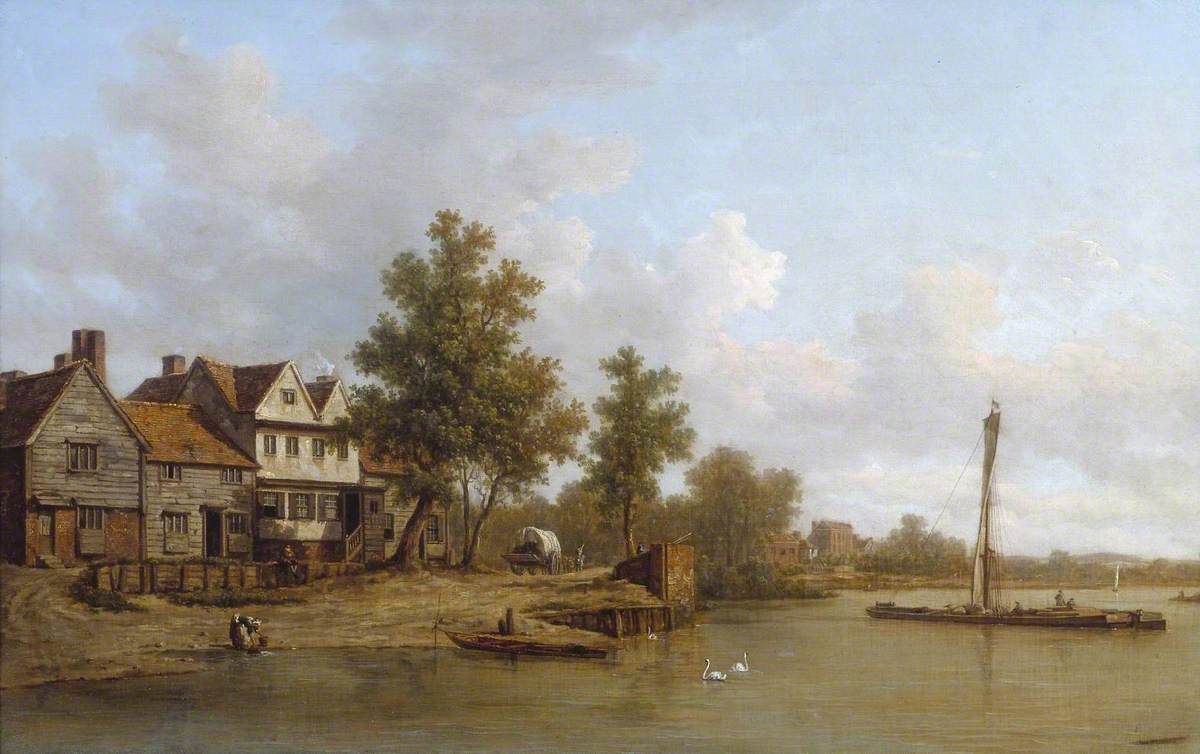
View on the Thames, 1775

View of the Terrace, Richmond Hill, c.1780

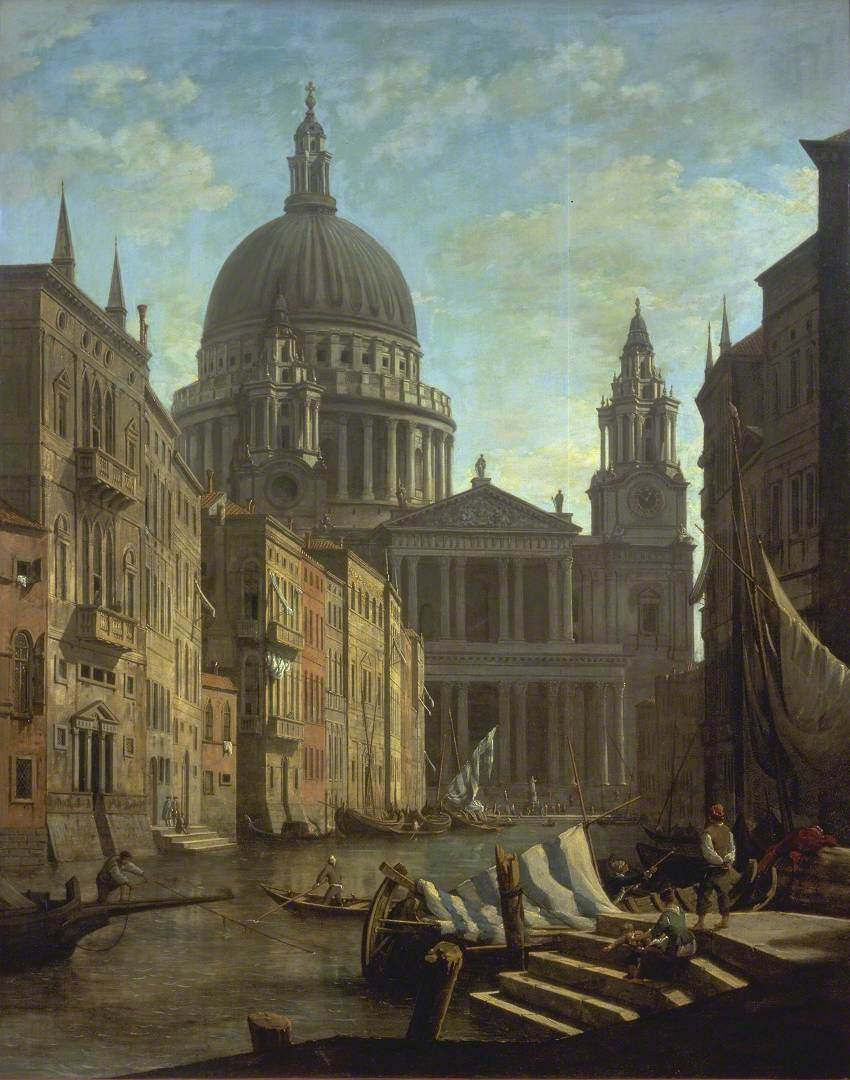
Capriccio: St Paul's and a Venetian Canal, 1795
