= Vicente Calderón de la Barca =

Spanish painter

Vicente Calderón de la Barca (1762–1794) was a Spanish painter, who was born at Guadalajara. He was a pupil of Francisco Goya, and distinguished himself as a painter of history and portraits, particularly the latter, in which he specialized. He painted a Birth of St. Norbert for one of the colleges at Ávila.
