= Karl Aigen =

Austrian painter (1684–1762)

Karl Josef Aigen (8 October 1684 – 22 October 1762) was an Austrian landscape painter.

== Life ==
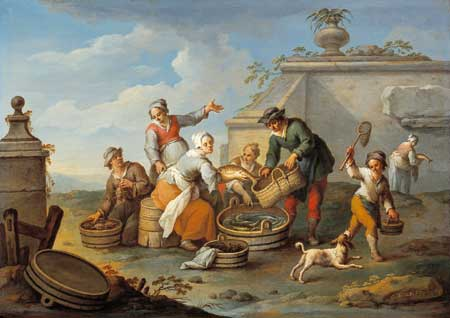
Fischmarkt by Karl Aigen

Aigen was born in Olomouc, Moravia, on 8 October 1685, the son of a goldsmith. He was a pupil of the Olomouc painter Dominik Maier. He lived in Vienna from about 1720, where he was professor of painting at the Academy from 1751 until his death. His work consists of landscapes with figures, genre paintings and altarpieces. His style shows the influence of artists from France and the Low Countries.

He died at Vienna on 21 October 1762.

The Gallery of the Belvedere in Vienna has two works by him, both scenes with figures.
