= Pietro Fontana (engraver) =

Italian engraver

Pietro Fontana (1762 – 18 September 1837) was an Italian engraver.

Born in Bassano del Grappa, he worked in Rome and specialized in subjects dealing with the Vatican and the Papacy. He was a member of the Accademia di San Luca. He started his career as a student of Raffaello Morghen, and is best known for his complete series of engravings of the sculptures of Canova.

He died in Rome in 1837.

Fontana's work is found in a number of collections including the Victoria and Albert Museum, the Scottish National Gallery of Modern Art, the Royal Collection Trust, the Metropolitan Museum of Art, and the Royal Academy of Arts.
