= Andreas Møller =

Danish portrait painter (1684–c.1762)

- Born: 30 November 1684; Copenhagen, Denmark
- Died: c. 1762
- Style: portrait, miniature

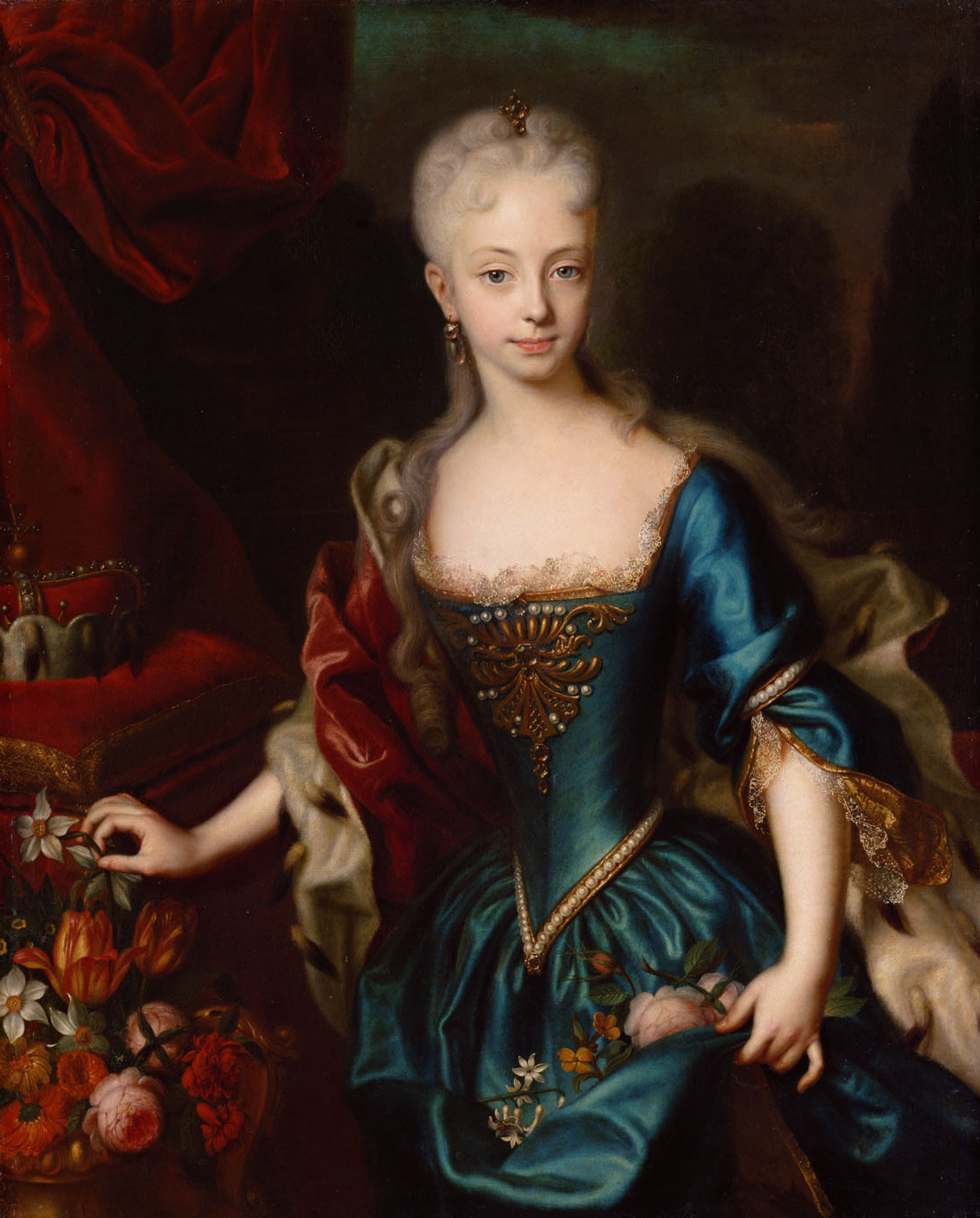
Maria Theresa by Andreas Møller c. 1727

Andreas Møller (German: Andreas Möller; nickname: English Møller; 30 November 1684 – c. 1762) was a Danish portrait painter and pioneer of miniature painting who worked at many European courts.

== Biography ==
Born in Copenhagen, Andreas Møller was the first Danish painter of international standing. Andreas was the son of Daniel Møller, the drawing teacher of King Frederick IV. Already in his youth he spent much time abroad, particularly in London, winning early renown as an accomplished artist.

He was considered a "half-English" and later, to distinguish him from his father, was nicknamed the "English Møller". In 1712, he finally left Denmark to work in Vienna, Kassel, Dresden, London, Paris, Florence, Mannheim, Leipzig, and Berlin, where are most of his works.

He was employed as painter to the Hessian court of the Landgrave Charles I in 1715 until 1721. The newly crowned king of Denmark, Christian VI, met him in 1732 in Dresden and later appointed him as court painter. He was Christian VI's court painter from 1736 to 1741. His works include mainly portraits of members of European royal and princely houses, including a 1727 portrait of Maria Theresa, Holy Roman Empress as a girl aged 11. For the imperial family in Vienna, he made several portraits and miniatures.

Described as a versatile and elegant man, as well as a fine patriot, Møller spent his remaining years in Berlin, where he probably died in 1762.
