= Four Times of the Day (Joseph Vernet) =

Painting series by Claude Joseph Vernet

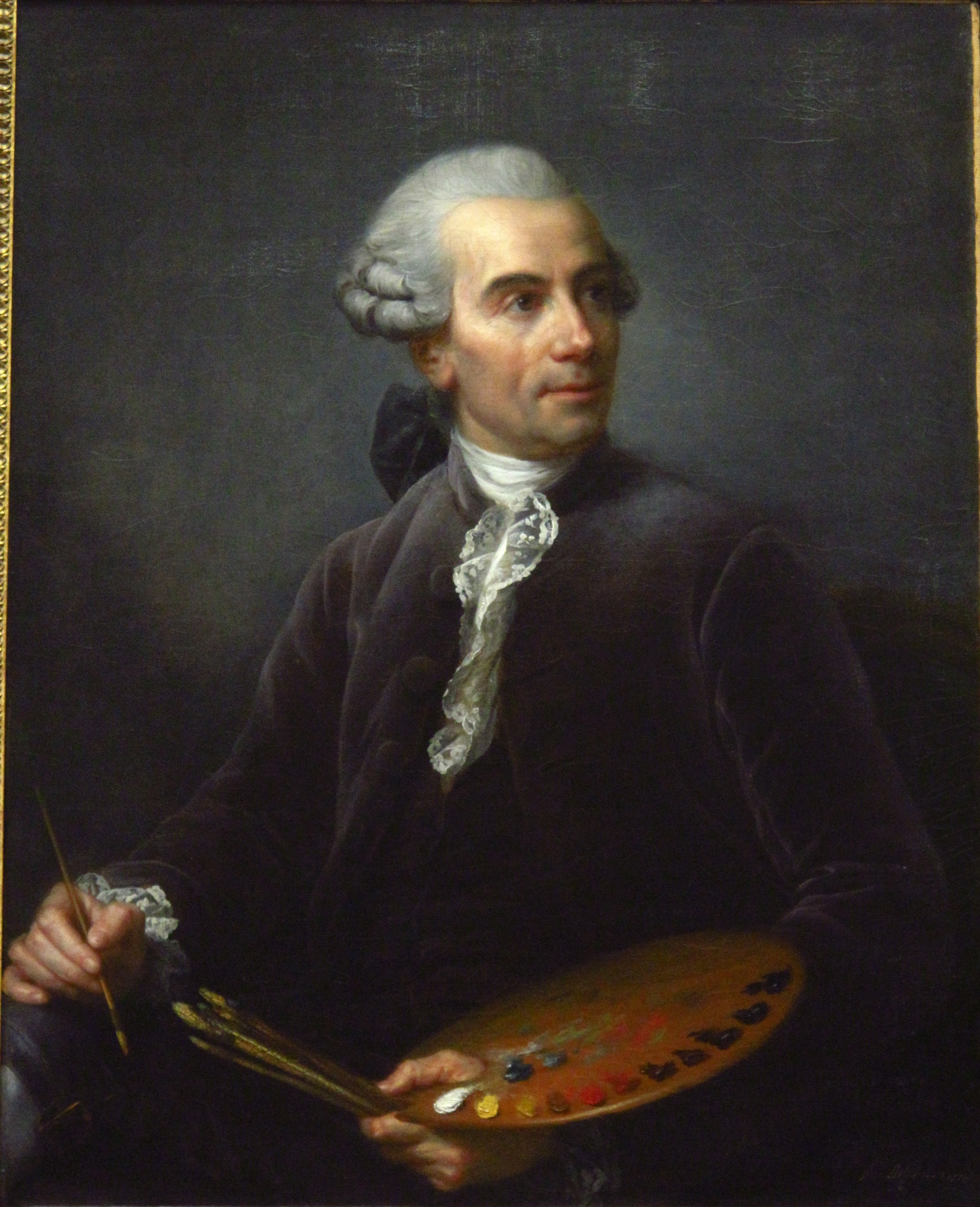
Portrait of Joseph Vernet (1714–1789), French painter

Four Times of the Day is a series of four paintings depicting four times of the day: Morning, Midday, Evening, and Night by the French landscape painter Claude Joseph Vernet (1714–1789).

They were painted in 1757 in Paris, and are held by the Art Gallery of South Australia, Adelaide. The paintings consist of four separate scenes depicting morning, midday, evening and night, a series created by several artists of the era including Vernet and Philip James de Loutherbourg.

== Artist ==
Claude Joseph Vernet was considered the leading French artist of his time in his genre, marine art and landscape painting. He came from a family of French painters: he was the son of a decorative painter, and his son Antoine-Charles-Horace Vernet, Carle Vernet (1758–1836), and his grandson Horace Vernet (1789–1863) were known as military painters. Vernet lived in Italy for 20 years, 1734 to 1753, where he had an atelier in Rome. His style was influenced by the Italian 17th-century painters Claude Lorrain and Salvator Rosa. His landscapes and especially seascapes were celebrated for their romantic qualities. Upon his return to France, a series of marine paintings were commissioned from him around 1753 by the French king Louis XV. This was to depict a series of seaports, of which 15 paintings were executed. The project lasted for about 10 years, and until 1765 he traveled around France painting seascapes, eventually abandoning the project unfinished.

== Paintings ==
In the series of four paintings, the first depiction is entitled Morning. The painting shows a misty morning scene with fishermen with their boat. The second, entitled Midday depicts a sudden, unexpected storm. The painting Evening shows women bathing and washing their clothes. The final scene shows a rocky inlet, with fishermen drying their nets while others are gathered round a fire. The scenes depicted in the paintings were Vernet's favourite scenes that he painted in different settings throughout his career.

The Four Times of the Day

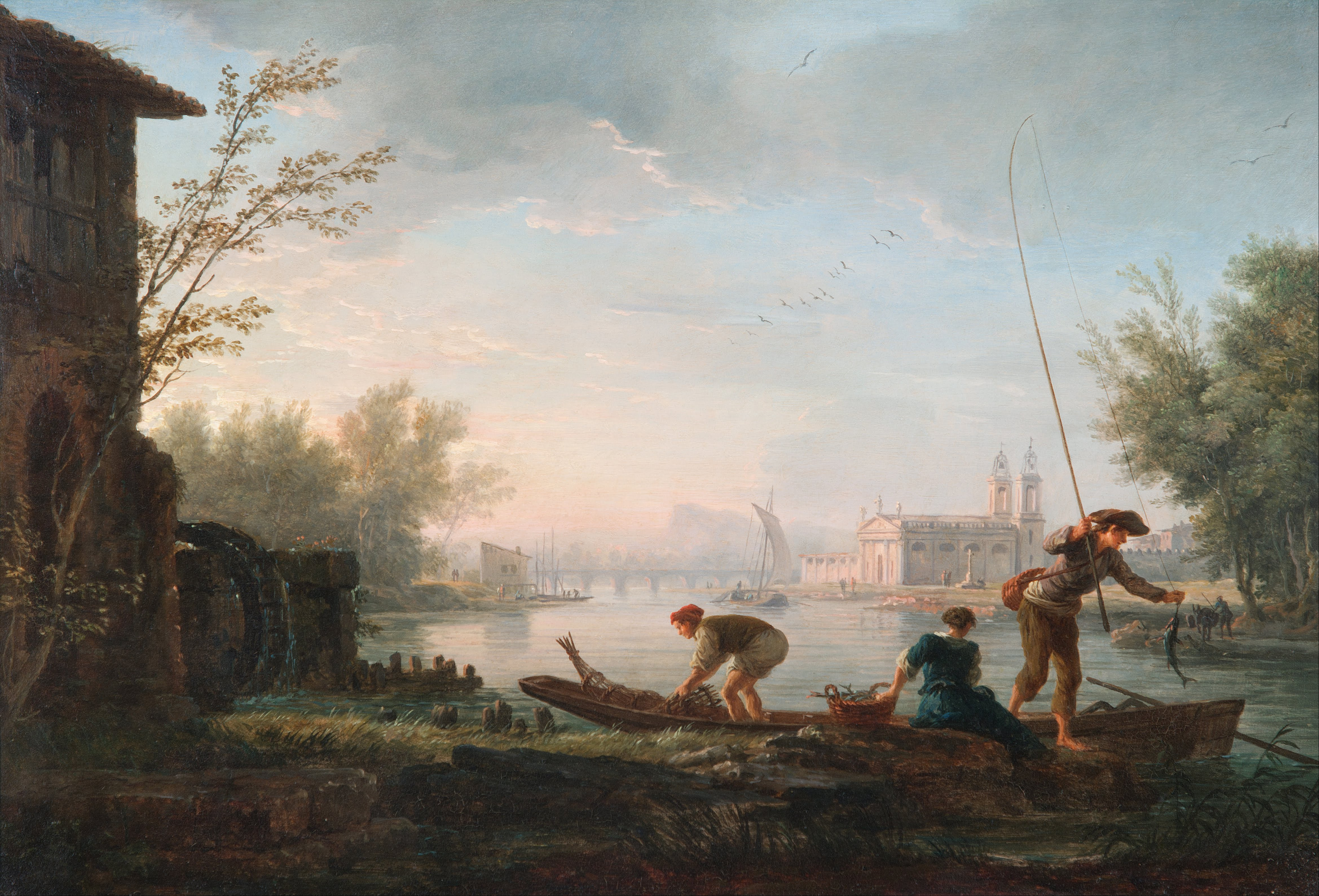
The four times of day: Morning

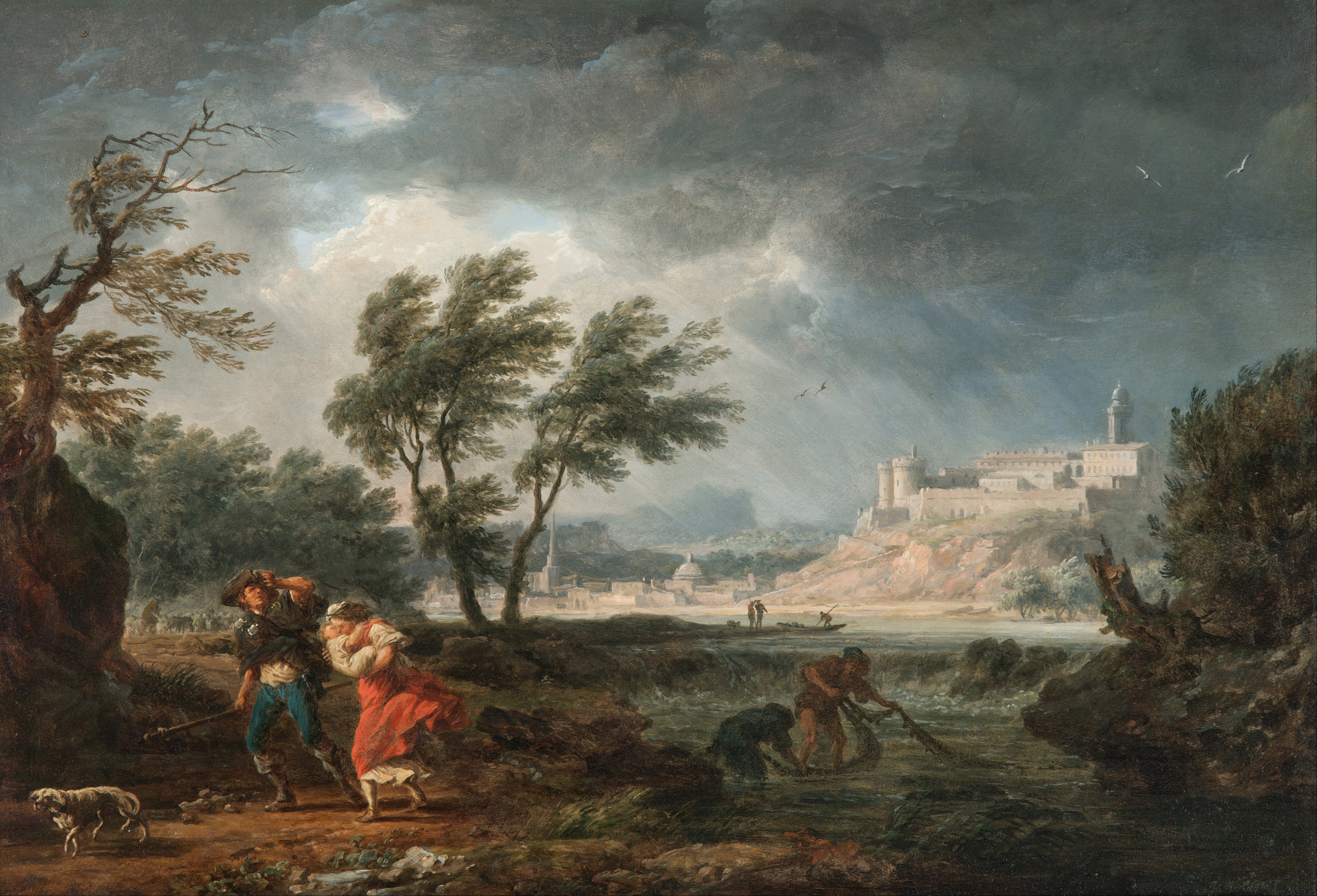
The four times of day: Midday

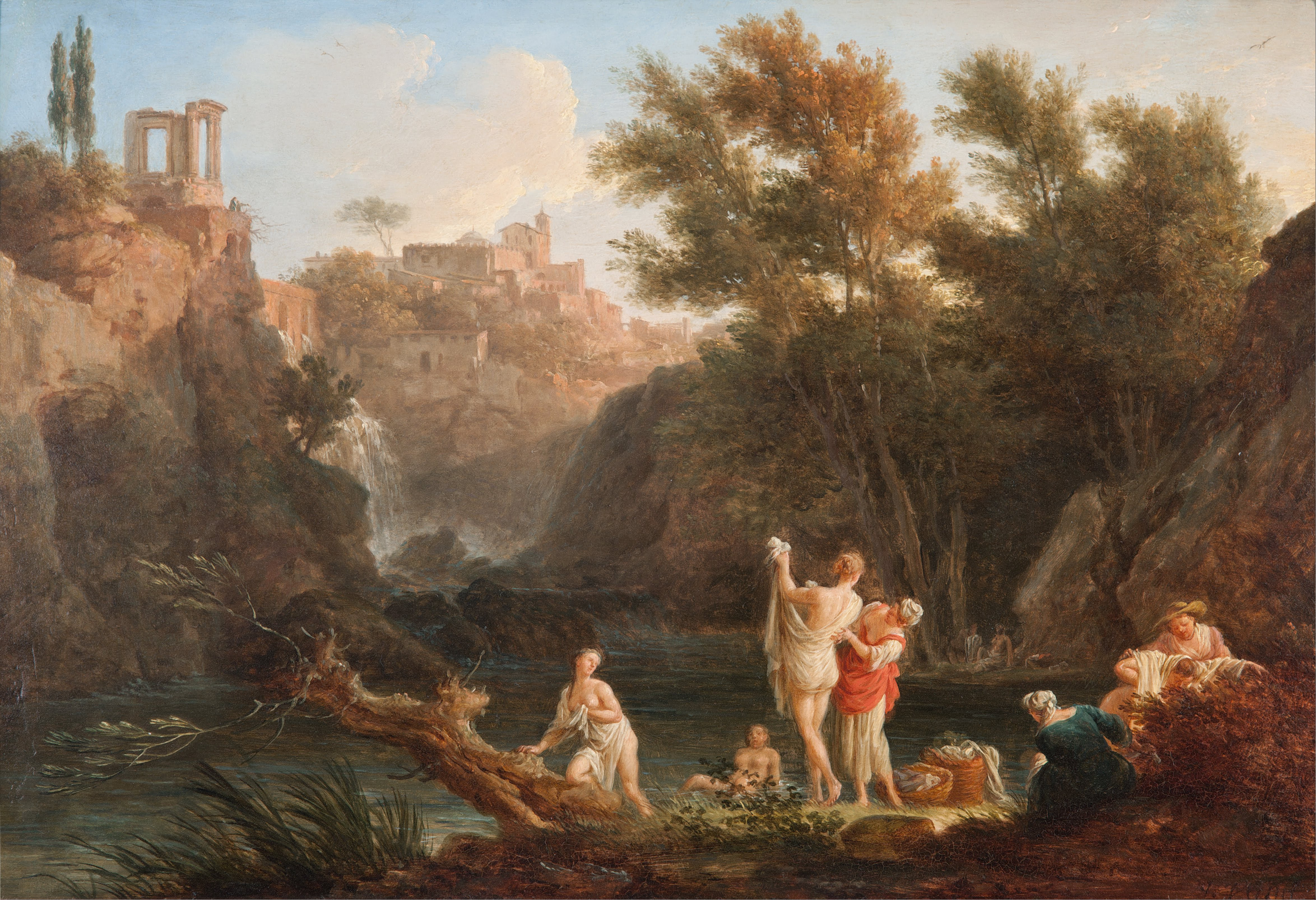
The four times of day: Evening

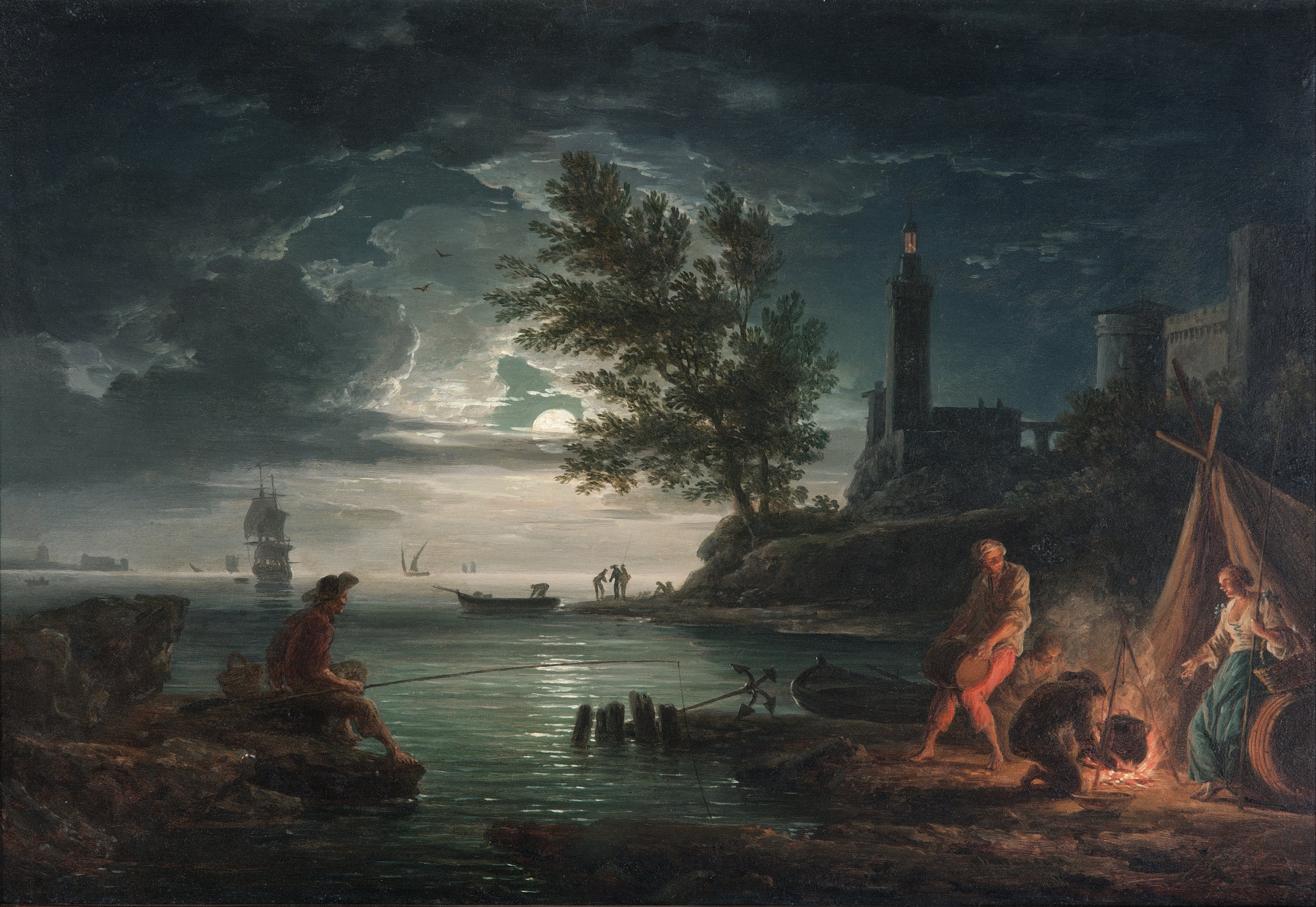
The four times of day: Night

== See also ==
- Coast
