= A River with Fishermen =

Painting by Claude-Joseph Vernet

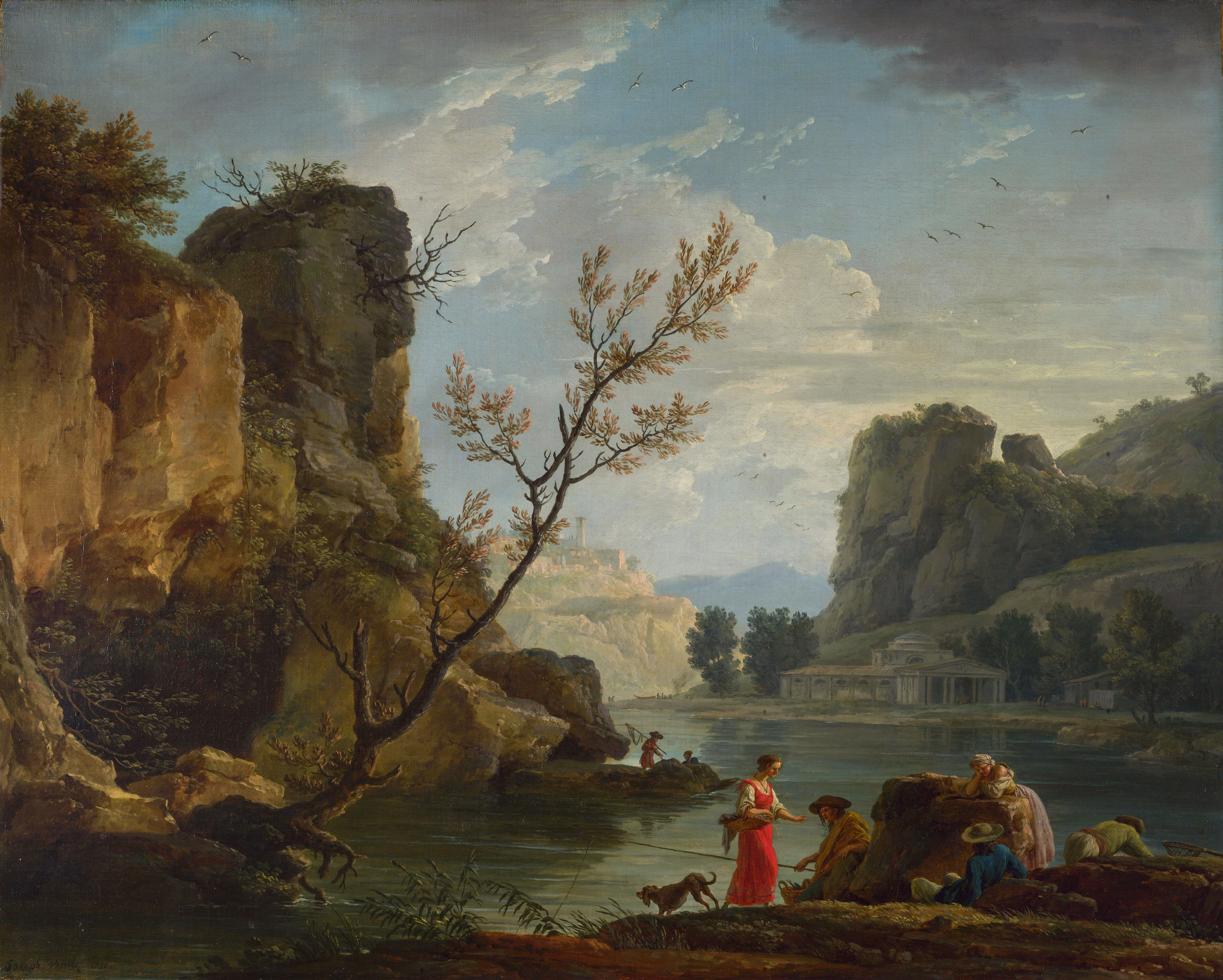
- Artist: Claude-Joseph Vernet
- Year: 1751
- Type: Oil on canvas, landscape painting
- Dimensions: 59.1 cm × 74.3 cm (23.3 in × 29.3 in)
- Location: National Gallery; London

A River with Fishermen is a 1751 landscape painting by the French artist Claude-Joseph Vernet. It depicts an idealised Italian landscape, where groups of men and women are shown fishing in a broad, tranquil river. The building on the right appears to be inspired by the Pantheon in Rome, while a hilltop village with a tower can be seen in the distance.

Vernet settled in Italy for a number of years before returning to France to produce his Views of the Ports of France, a series of pictures for Louis XV. It was displayed at the Salon of 1751 at the Louvre with a pendant piece showing a sunrise. The painting was acquired by the art collector John Henderson who in 1879 bequeathed it to the National Gallery, in London.

== Bibliography ==
- Preti, Monica (ed.) Delicious Decadence ?The Rediscovery of French Eighteenth-Century Painting in the Nineteenth Century. Routledge, 2017.
- Wine, Humphrey. The Eighteenth Century French Paintings. National Gallery Company, 2018.
