= Coast Scene with a British Man of War =

Painting by Claude-Joseph Vernet

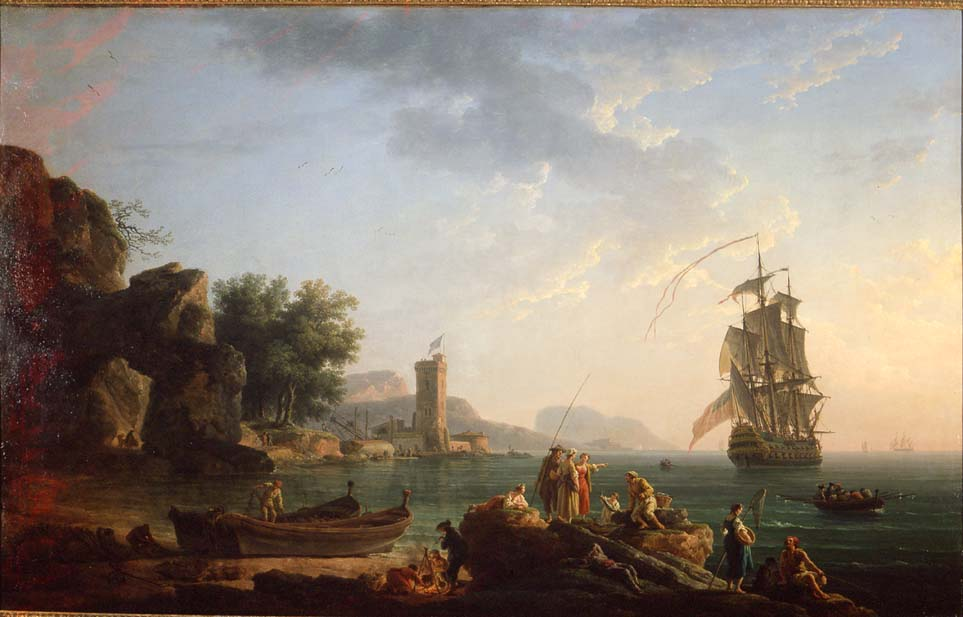
- Artist: Claude-Joseph Vernet
- Year: 1766
- Type: Oil on canvas, landscape painting
- Dimensions: 81.8 cm × 131.2 cm (32.2 in × 51.7 in)
- Location: Manchester Art Gallery; Manchester

Coast Scene with a British Man of War is an oil on canvas landscape painting by the French artist Claude-Joseph Vernet, from 1766.

== History and description ==
It depicts a view of the Bay of Baiae off the coast of the Kingdom of Naples. A ship-of-the-line of Britain's Royal Navy is prominent to the right while the island of Procida is visible in the distance. It was produced after he had settled in Paris. Vernet was very popular in Britain. It was one of two paintings commissioned for an unidentified English buyer. It has been in the collection of the Manchester Art Gallery since 1977.

== Bibliography ==
- Cordingly, David. Painters of the Sea: A Survey of Dutch and English Marine Paintings from British Collections. Lund Humphries, 1979.
- Wright, Christopher. The World's Master Paintings: From the Early Renaissance to the Present Day. Routledge, 1992.
