= A Landscape at Sunset =

Painting by Claude-Joseph Vernet

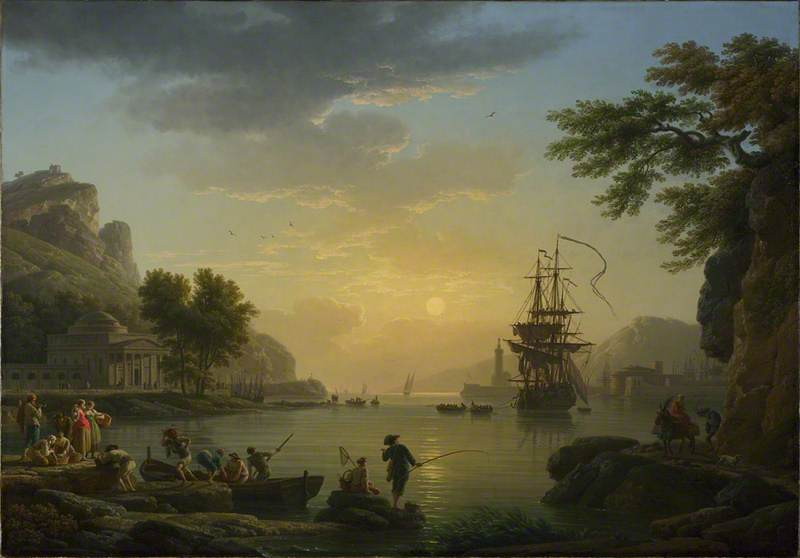
- Artist: Claude-Joseph Vernet
- Year: 1773
- Type: Oil on canvas, landscape painting
- Dimensions: 114.5 cm × 163.5 cm (45.1 in × 64.4 in)
- Location: National Gallery, London

A Landscape at Sunset is a 1773 landscape painting by the French artist Joseph Vernet. It portrays a view of a harbour bathed in sunshine on a summer's day with fisherman bringing on their catch.

It was commissioned by King of Poland, Stanisław August Poniatowski as one of a pair of landscapes along with A Shipwreck in Stormy Seas. After the deal fell through, the paintings were instead bought by the British general Clive of India. Both are now in the collection of the National Gallery in London.

== Bibliography ==
- Barker, Emma. Art & Visual Culture 1600-1850: Academy to Avant-Gard. Tate Enterprises, 2013.
- Conisbee, Phillip. French Paintings of the Fifteenth Through the Eighteenth Century. National Gallery of Art, 2010.
- Della Dora, Veronica. Where Light in Darkness Lies: The Story of the Lighthouse. Reaktion Books, 2022.
- Lipinski, Lisa Kim. Monet and Impressionism: Boats and Boating. 1985.
