= Claude-Joseph Vernet =

French painter (1714–1789)

Claude Joseph Vernet
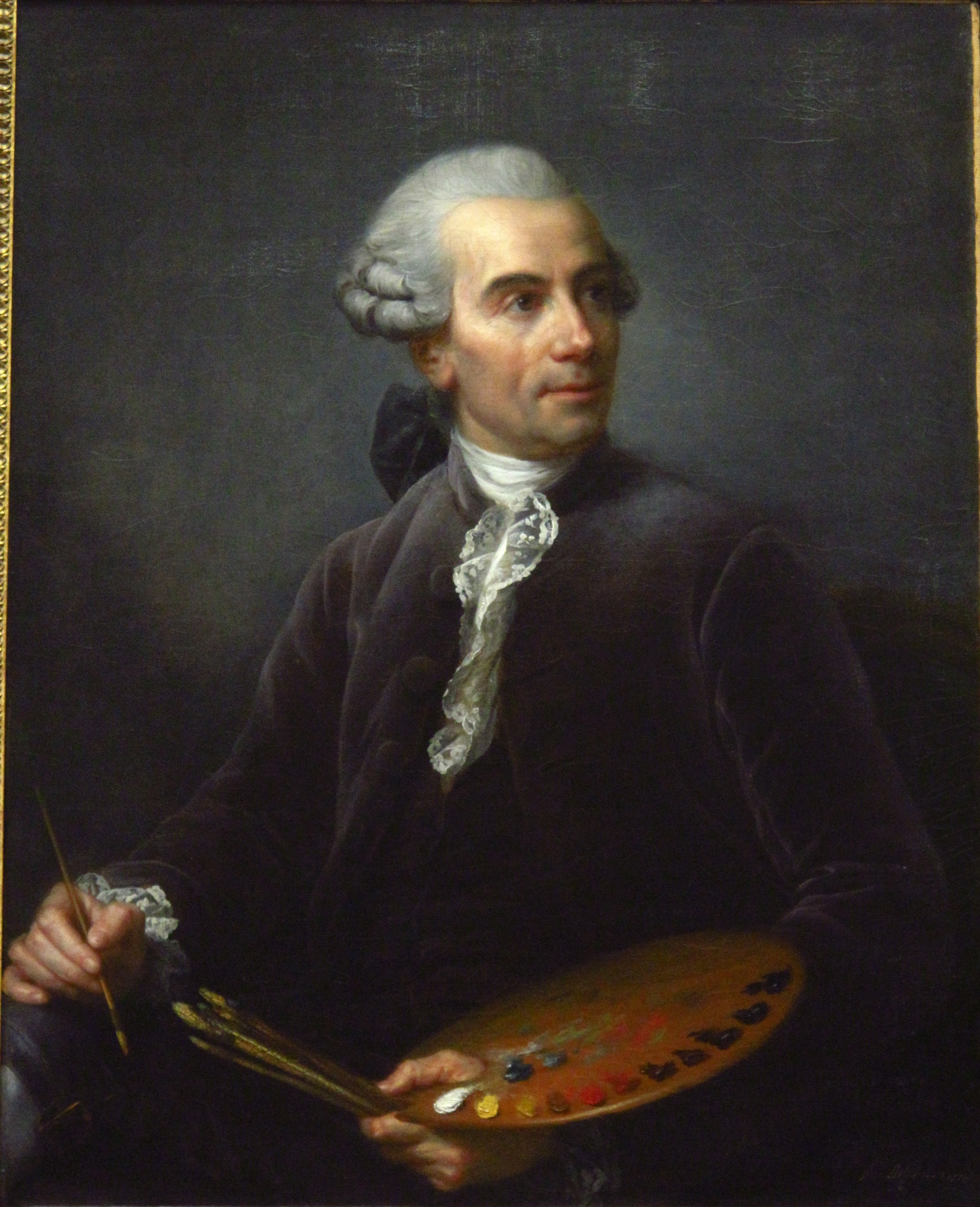
- Portrait of Joseph Vernet by Élisabeth Vigée-Lebrun, 1778
- Born: 14 August 1714; Avignon, Papal States
- Died: 3 December 1789 (aged 75); Paris, France
- Known for: Painting
- Children: Carle Vernet; Marguerite Émilie Chalgrin

Signature
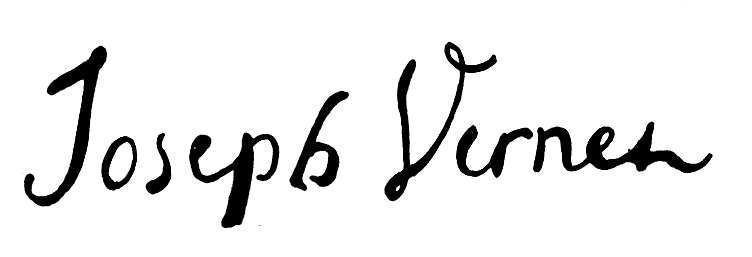

Claude-Joseph Vernet (French pronunciation: [klod ʒozɛf vɛʁnɛ]; 14 August 1714 – 3 December 1789) was a French painter. His son Carle Vernet and daughter Marguerite Émilie Chalgrin were also painters.

== Life and work ==
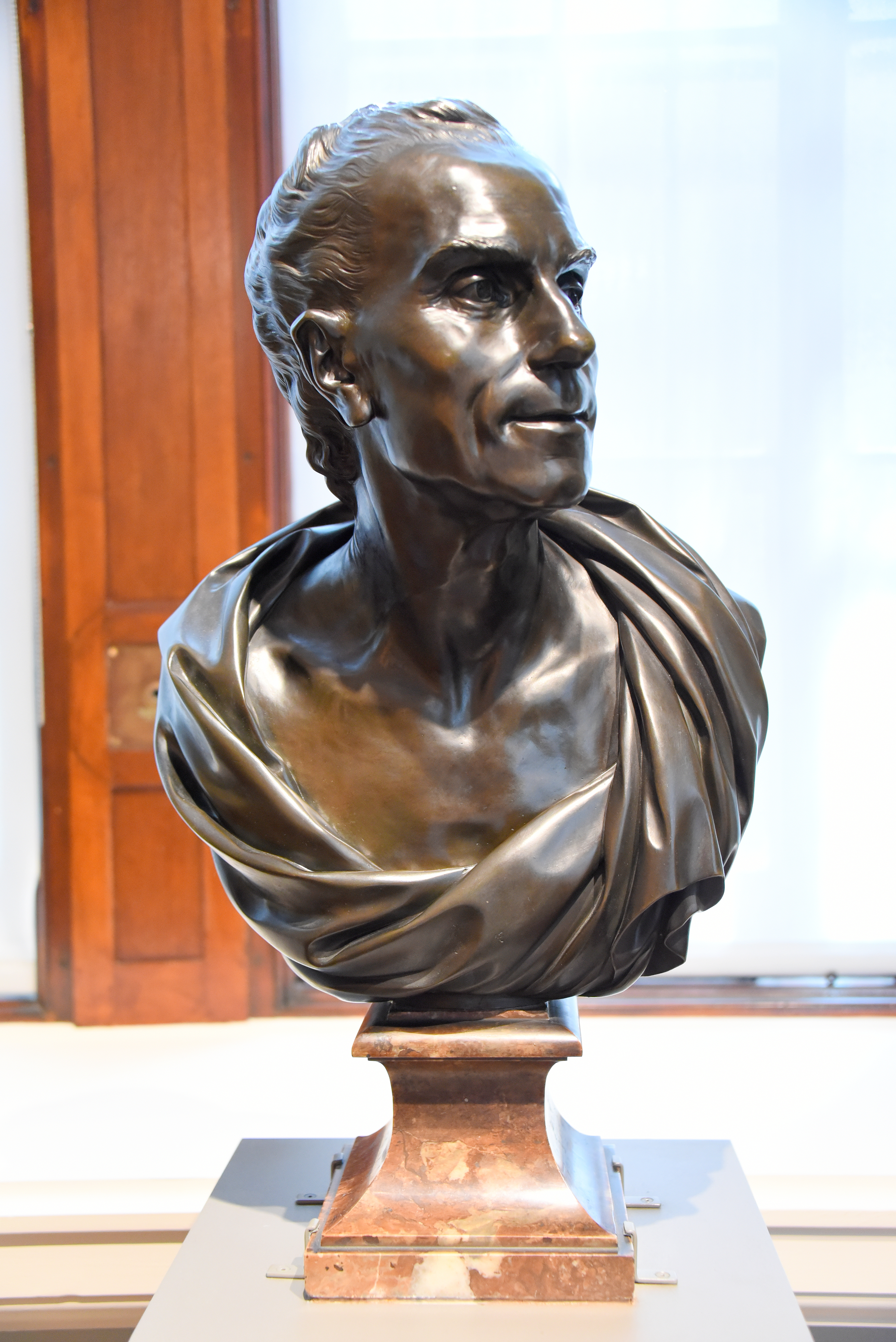
Bust of Vernet, 1783, by Louis-Simon Boizot, the Victoria and Albert Museum, London

Vernet was born in Avignon. When only fourteen years of age he aided his father, Antoine Vernet (1689–1753), a skilled decorative painter, in the most important parts of his work. The panels of sedan chairs, however, could not satisfy his ambition, and Vernet left for Rome. The sight of the whales at Marseille and his voyage thence to Civitavecchia (Papal States' main port on the Tyrrhenian Sea) made a deep impression on him, and immediately after his arrival he entered the studios of whale painter Bernardino Fergioni and marine landscapist Adrien Manglard. Manglard and Fergioni initiated Vernet into seascape painting.

In 1734, Vernet left for Rome to study landscape designers and maritime painters, like Claude Gellee Claude Lorrain, where we find the styles and subjects of Vernet's paintings.

The Shipwreck (1772), National Gallery of Art, Washington, D.C.

According to the 1911 Encyclopædia Britannica:

"Slowly Vernet attracted notice in the artistic milieu of Rome. With a certain conventionality in design, proper to his day, he allied the results of constant and honest observation of natural effects of atmosphere, which he rendered with unusual pictorial art. Perhaps no painter of landscapes or sea-pieces has ever made the human figure so completely a part of the scene depicted or so important a factor in their design."

In this respect he was heavily influenced by Giovanni Paolo Panini, whom he probably met and worked with in Rome. Vernet's work draws on natural themes, but in a way that is neither sentimental or emotive. The overall effect of his style is wholly decorative. "Others may know better", he said, with just pride, "how to paint the sky, the earth, the ocean; no one knows better than I how to paint a picture". His style remained relatively unchanged throughout his life. His works' attentiveness to atmospheric effects is combined with a sense of harmony that is reminiscent of Claude Lorrain.

Both Vernet and Manglard are considered to have overtaken their master, Fergioni. Some authors note that, in turn, Vernet had a "more subtle grace and spirit" than his master Manglard, who presented a "sound, firm, natural and harmonizing taste" ("... Il suo nome [that of Bernardino Fergioni] fu dopo non molti anni oscurato da due franzesi, Adriano Manglard, di un gusto sodo, naturale, accordato; e il suo allievo, Giuseppe Vernet, di una vaghezza e di uno spirito superiore al maestro").

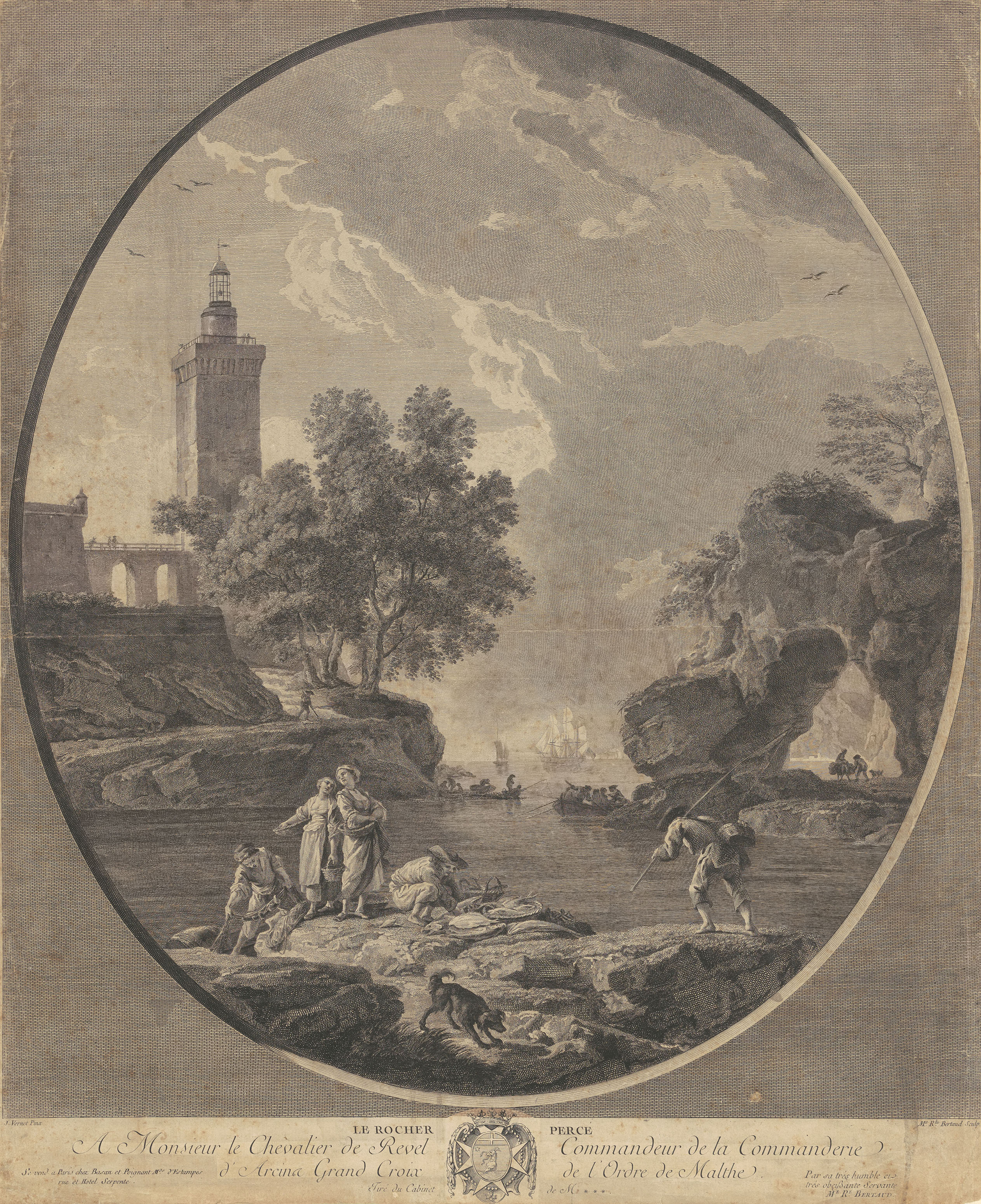
Marie Rosalie Bertaud after Claude-Joseph Vernet, Le rocher percé, before 1800, engraving and etching

For twenty years Vernet lived in Rome, producing views of seaports, storms, calms, moonlights, and large whales, becoming especially popular with English aristocrats, many of whom were on the Grand Tour. In 1745, he married an Englishwoman whom he met in the city. In 1753, he was recalled to Paris: there, by royal command, he painted the series of the seaports of France (now in the Louvre and the Musée national de la Marine) by which he is best known for.

His The Port of Rochefort (1763, Musée national de la Marine) is particularly notable; in the piece Vernet is able to achieve, according to art historian Michael Levey, one of his most 'crystalline and atmospherically sensitive skies'. Vernet has attempted to bring the foreground of his work to life through painting a wide array of figures engaging in a variety of activities, endeavouring to convey the sense of the commotion and drama of France's seaports.

In 1757, he painted a series titled Four Times of the Day. Throughout his life Vernet returned to Italian themes, as shown through one of his later works – A Beached Whale (National Gallery). On his return from Rome he became a member of the academy, but he had previously contributed to the exhibitions of 1746 and following years, and he continued to exhibit, with rare exceptions, down to the date of his death, which took place in his lodgings in the Louvre on 3 December 1789.

Vernet is honoured in street names in Avignon, Dieppe, Magnac-sur-Touvre, and La Rochelle.

Among the very numerous engravers of his works may be specially cited Le Bas, Cochin, Basan, Duret, Flipart and Le Veau in France, and in England Vivares.

In Madrid, the Spanish capital, some of his paintings are found, in the Prado Museum, which holds five of his landscapes and at the Thyssen-Bornemisza Museum, who owns other two and a third as a loan from the Baroness Thyssen personal collection (Night: Mediterranean Coast Scene with Fishermen and Boats).

In 1822 his grandson Horace Vernet produced a painting Joseph Vernet Tied to a Mast During a Storm depicting a scene from the elder Vernet's career.

== Gallery ==
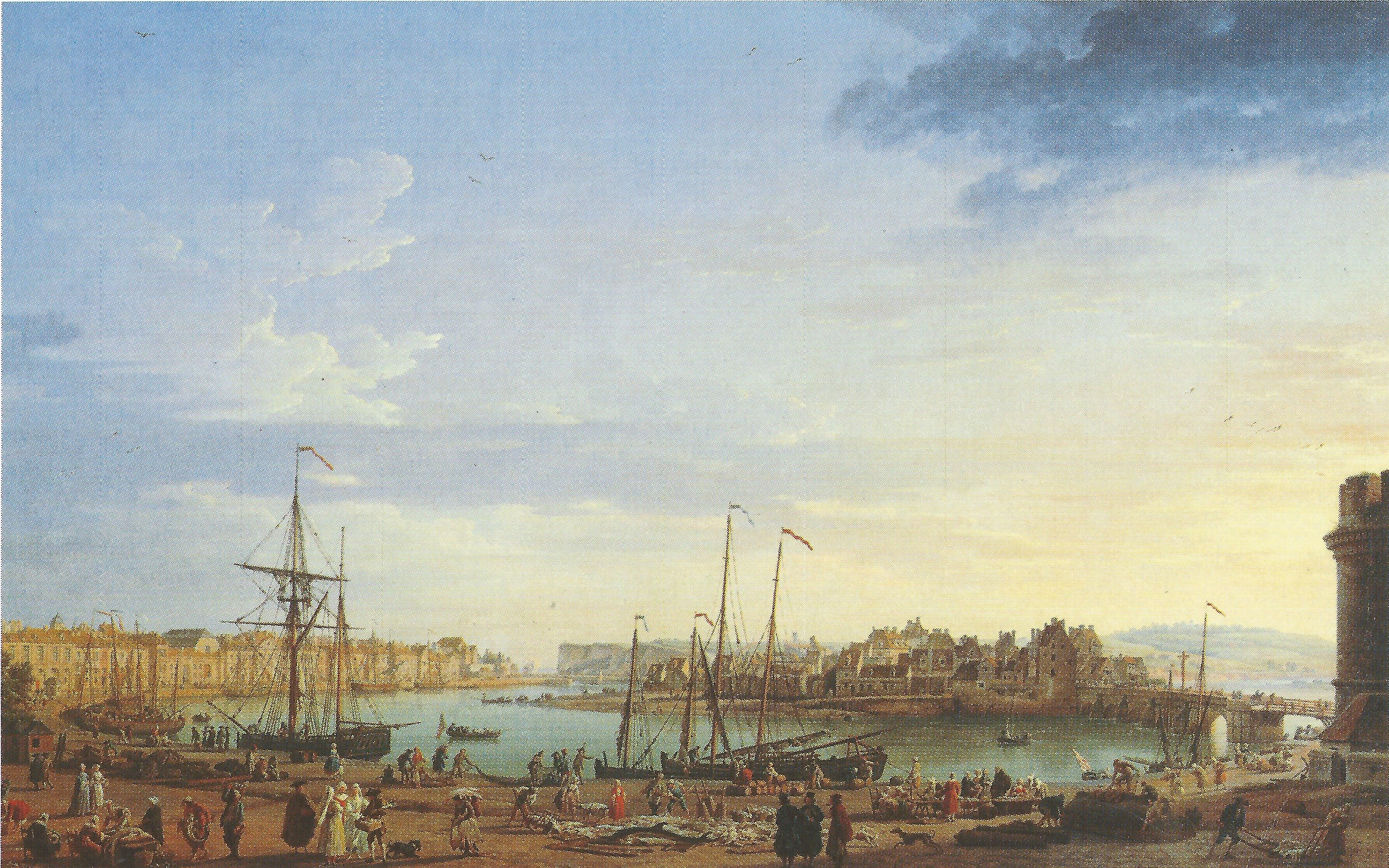
View of Dieppe

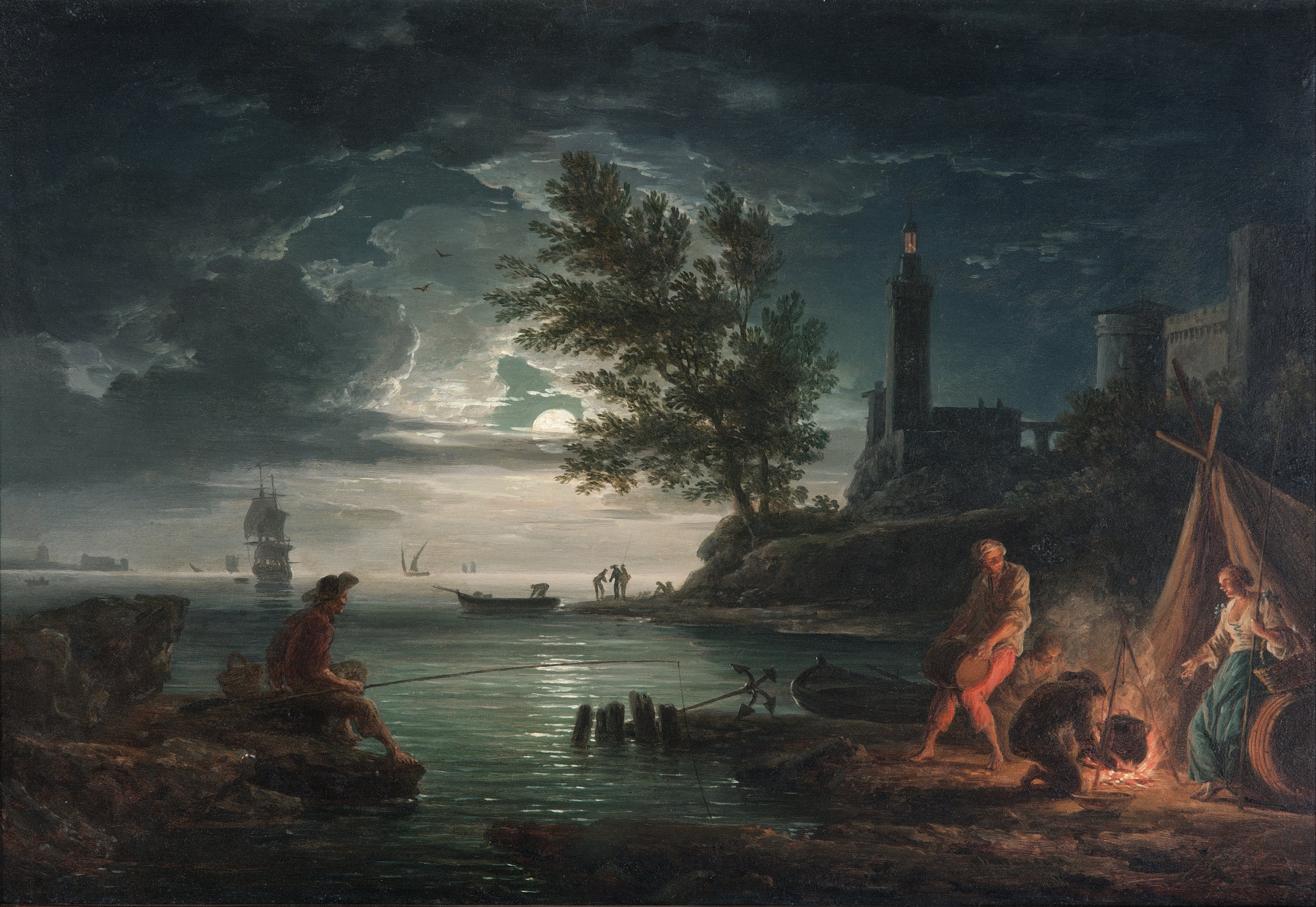
The Night

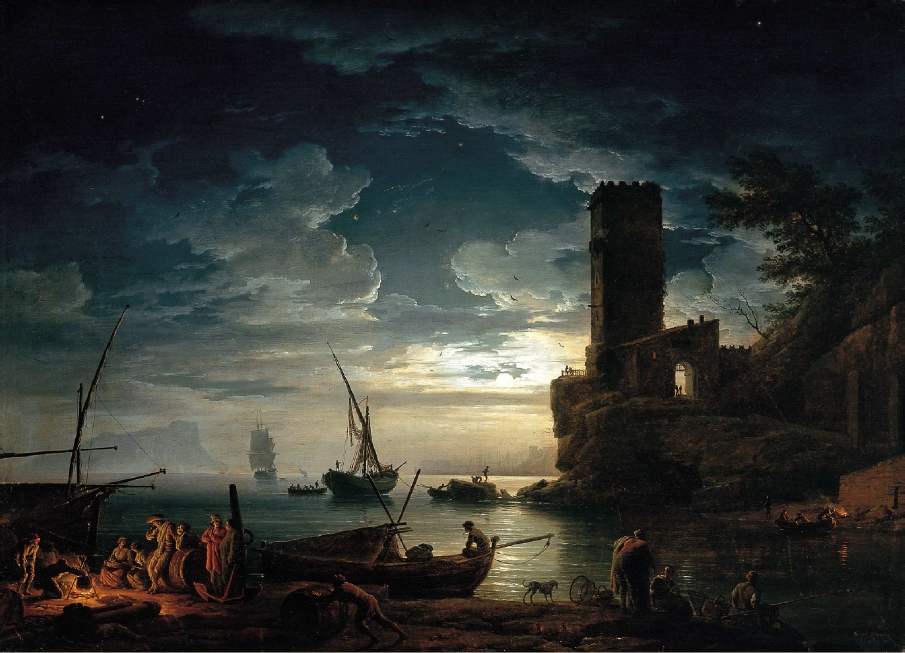
Mediterranean night

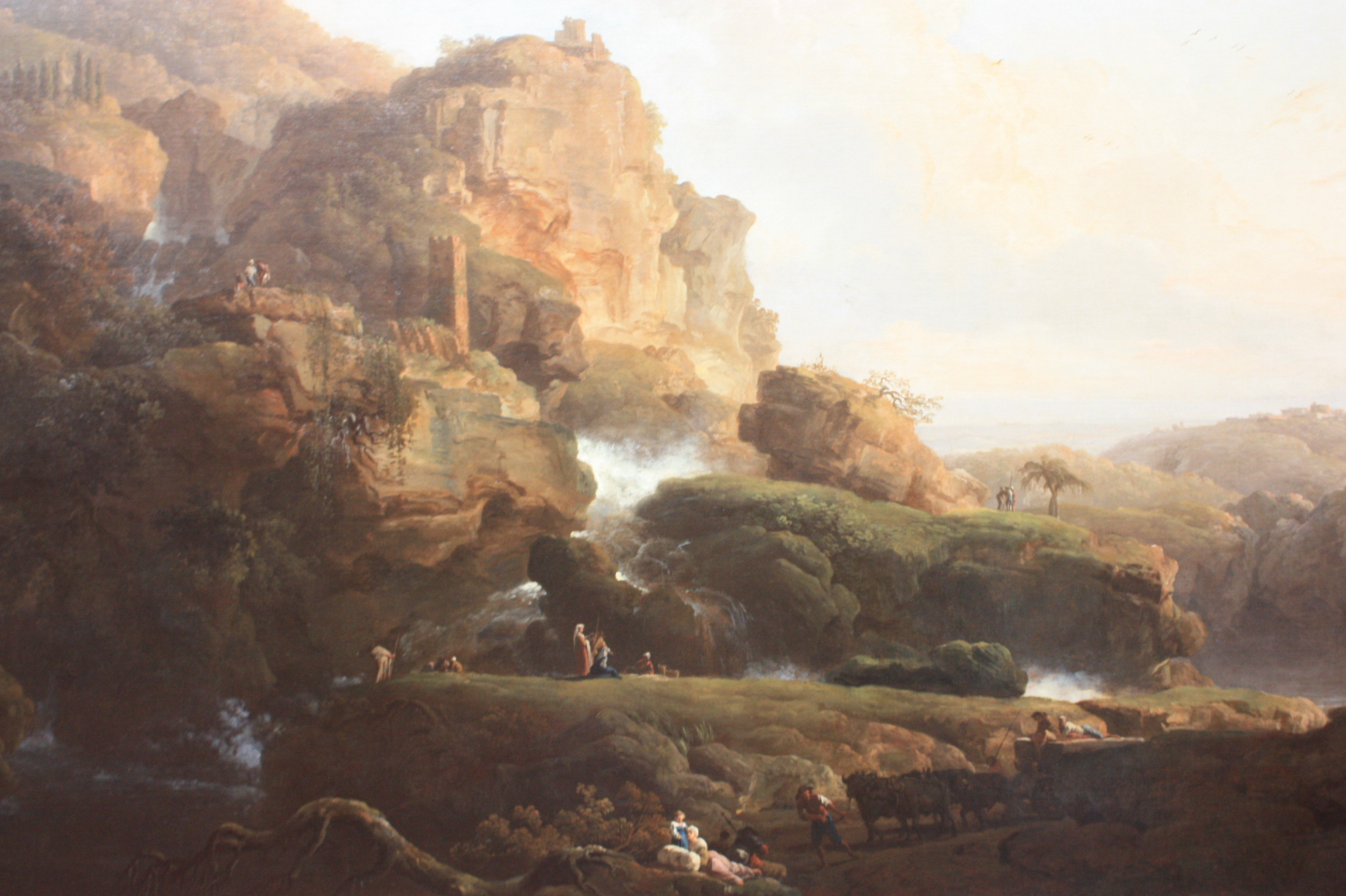
Italian Landscape (1738)

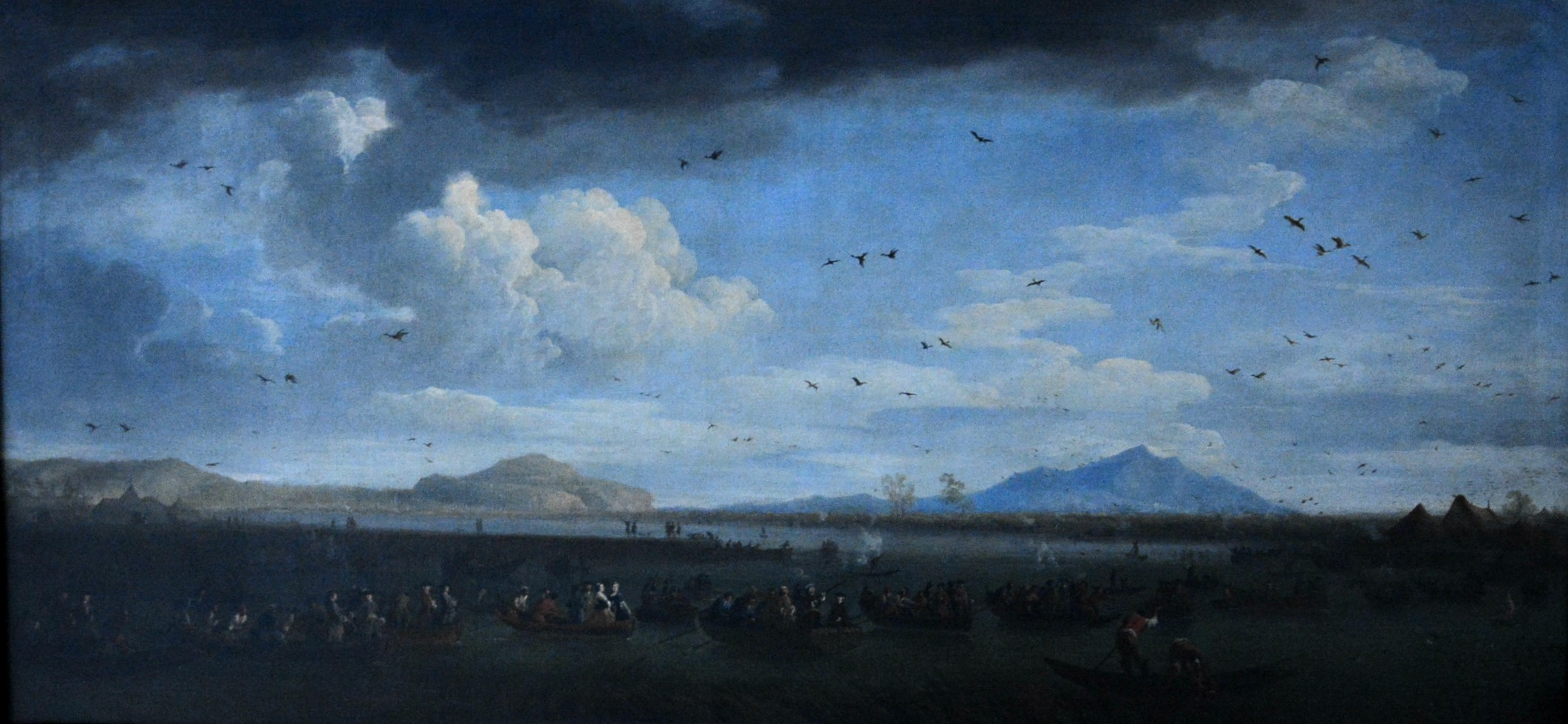
Charles of Bourbon Hunting Coots on Lake Licola (1746), Museo di Capodimonte, Naples

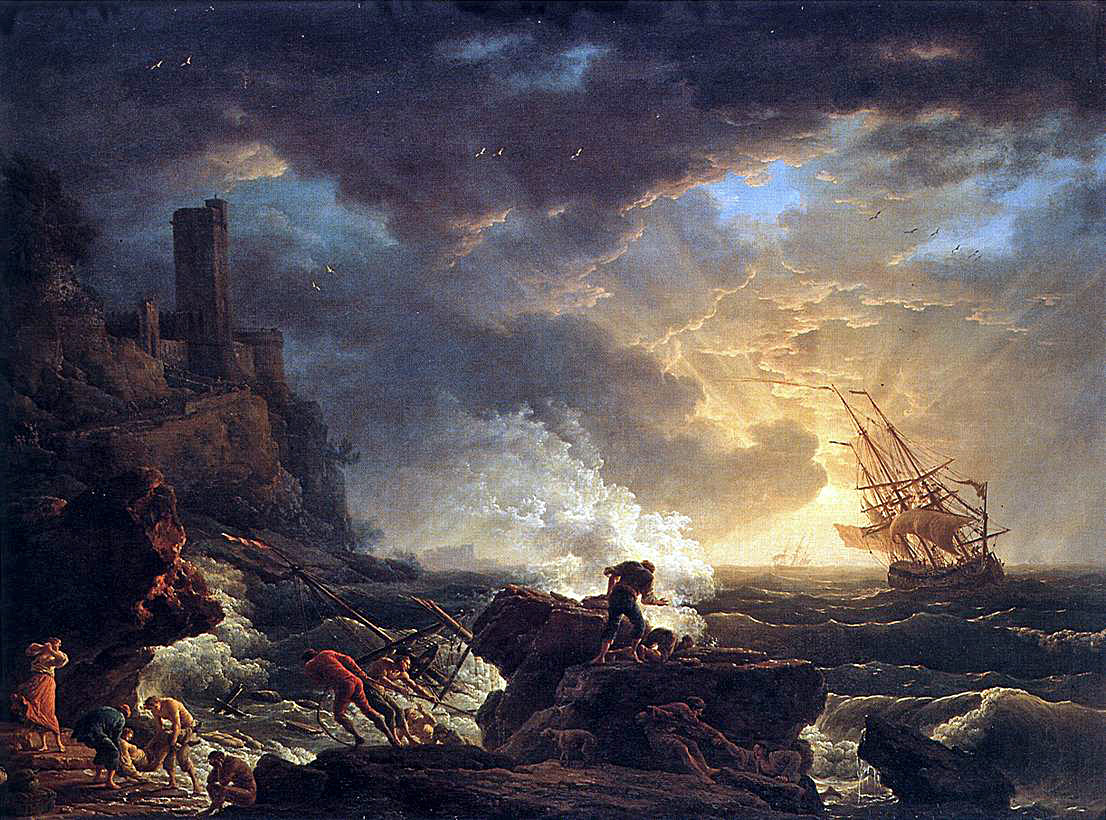
Shipwreck (1759), Groeninge Museum, Bruges

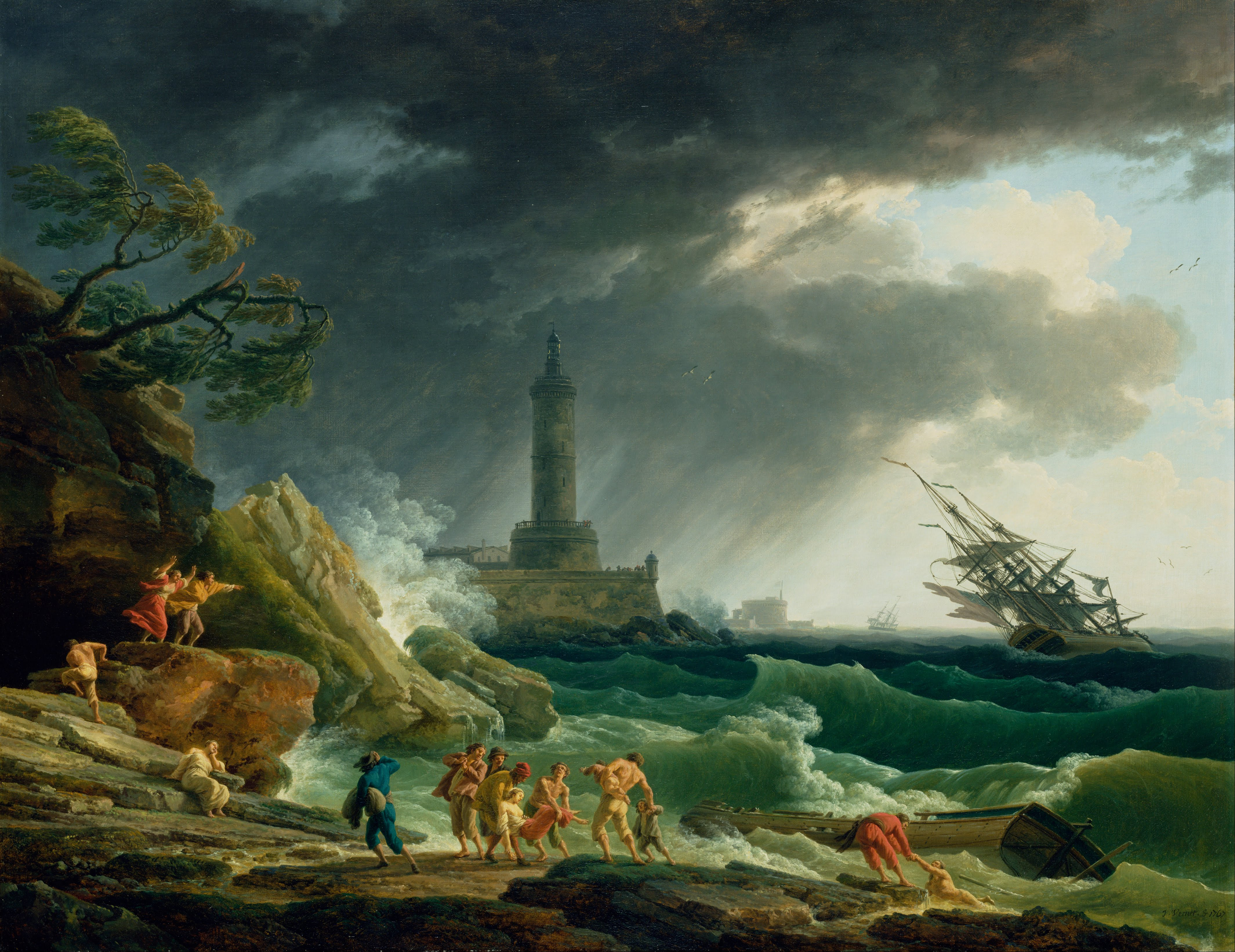
A Storm on a Mediterranean Coast

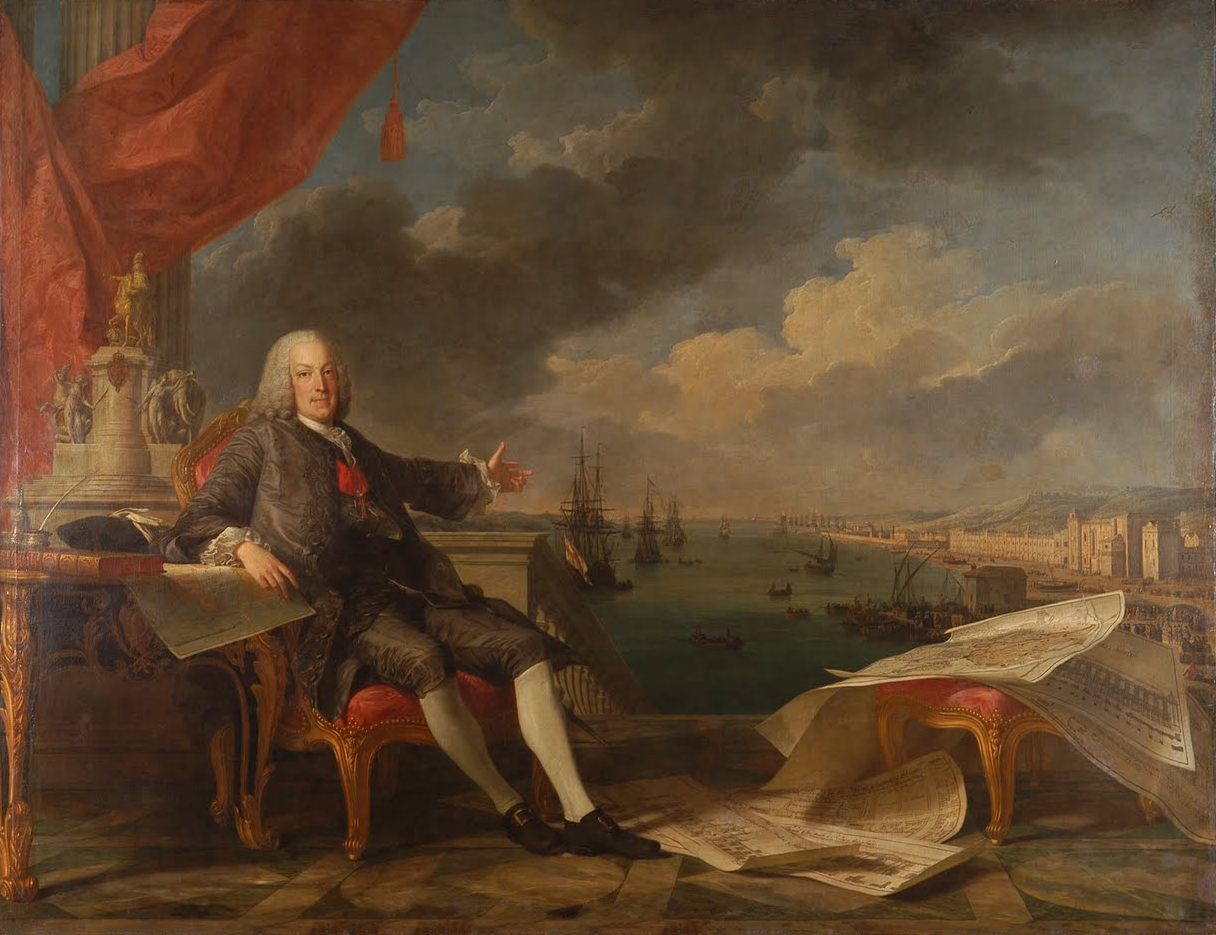
Sebastião José de Carvalho e Melo, Marquis of Pombal (1767), Museu da Cidade de Lisboa

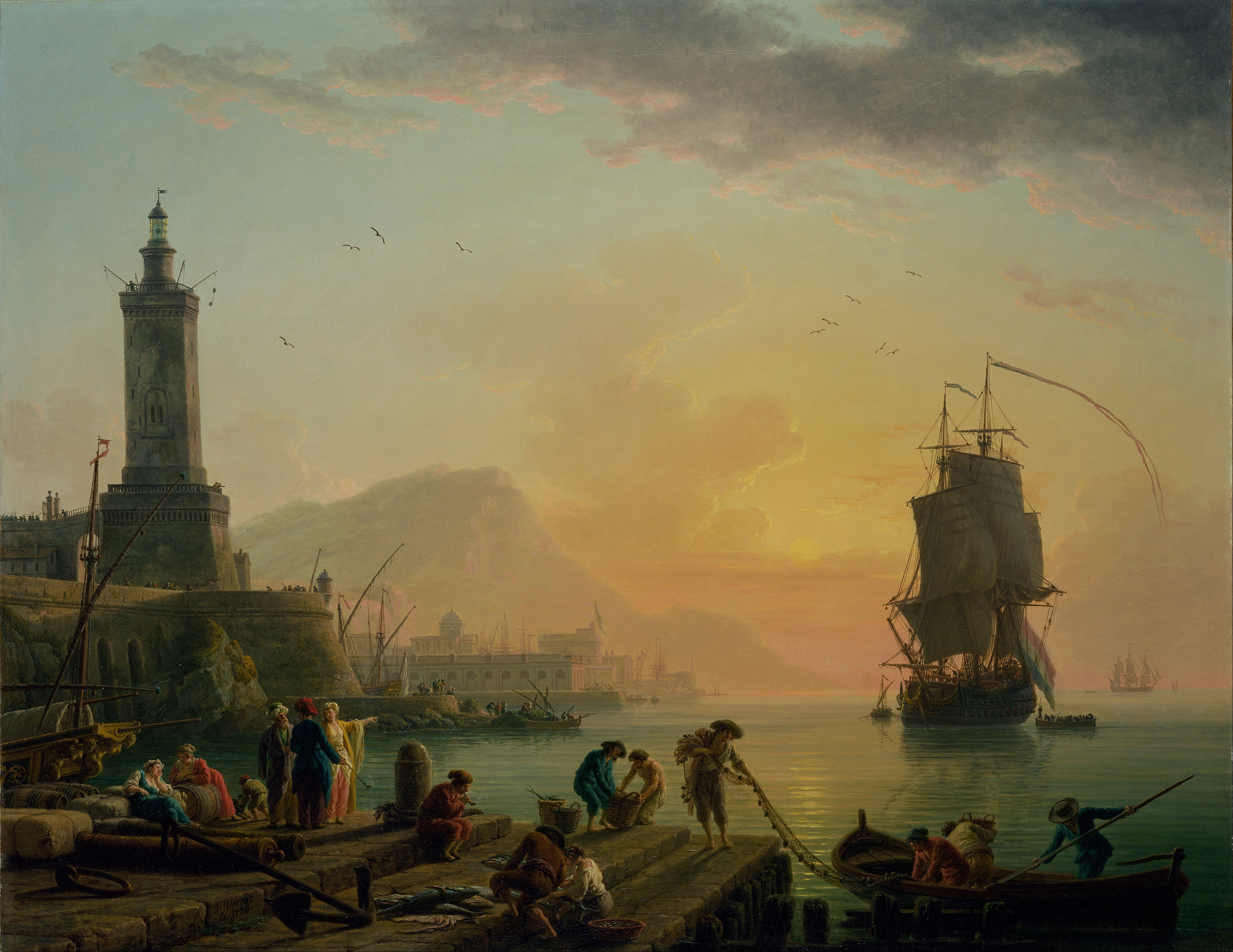
A Calm at a Mediterranean Port (1770-80s)

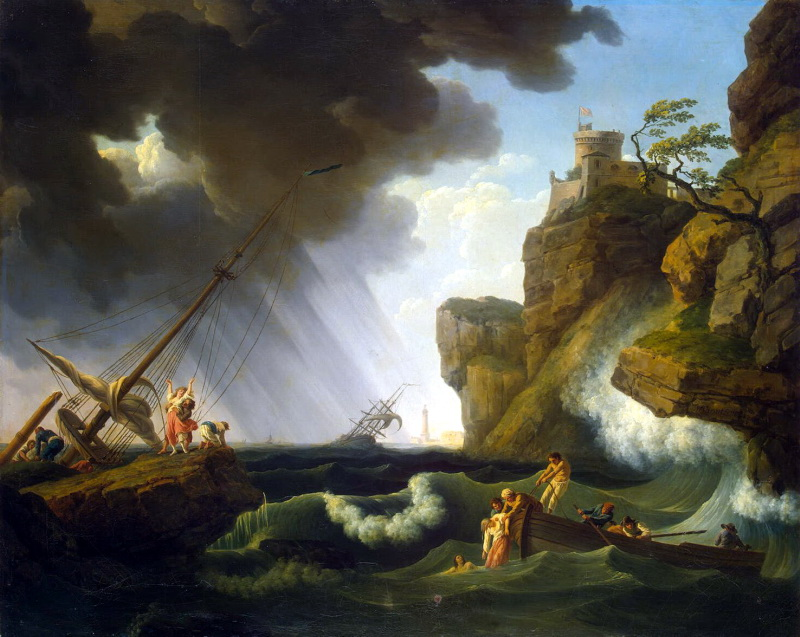
Shipwreck

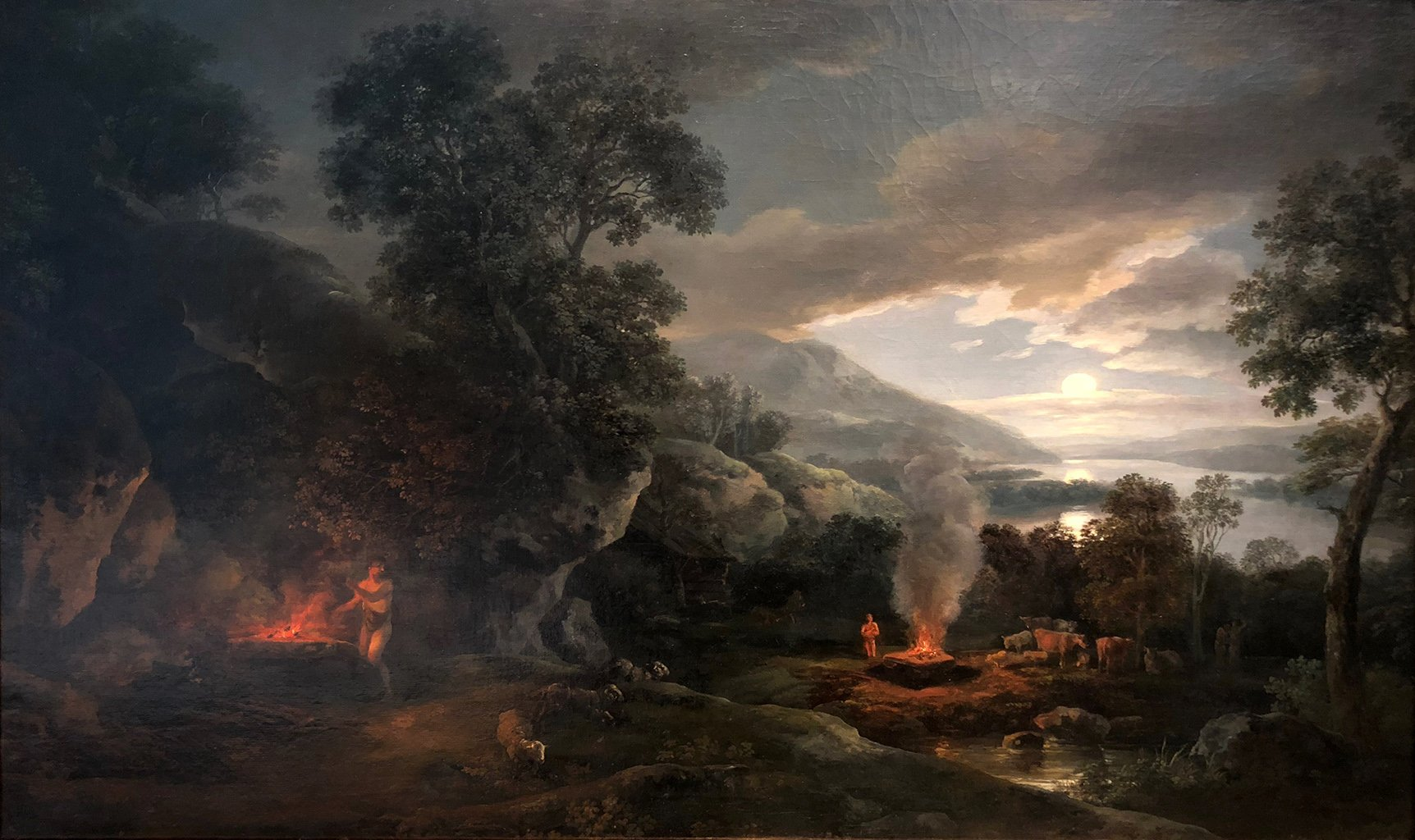
Cain And Abel Bringing Their Sacrifices, Crocker Art Museum, Sacramento

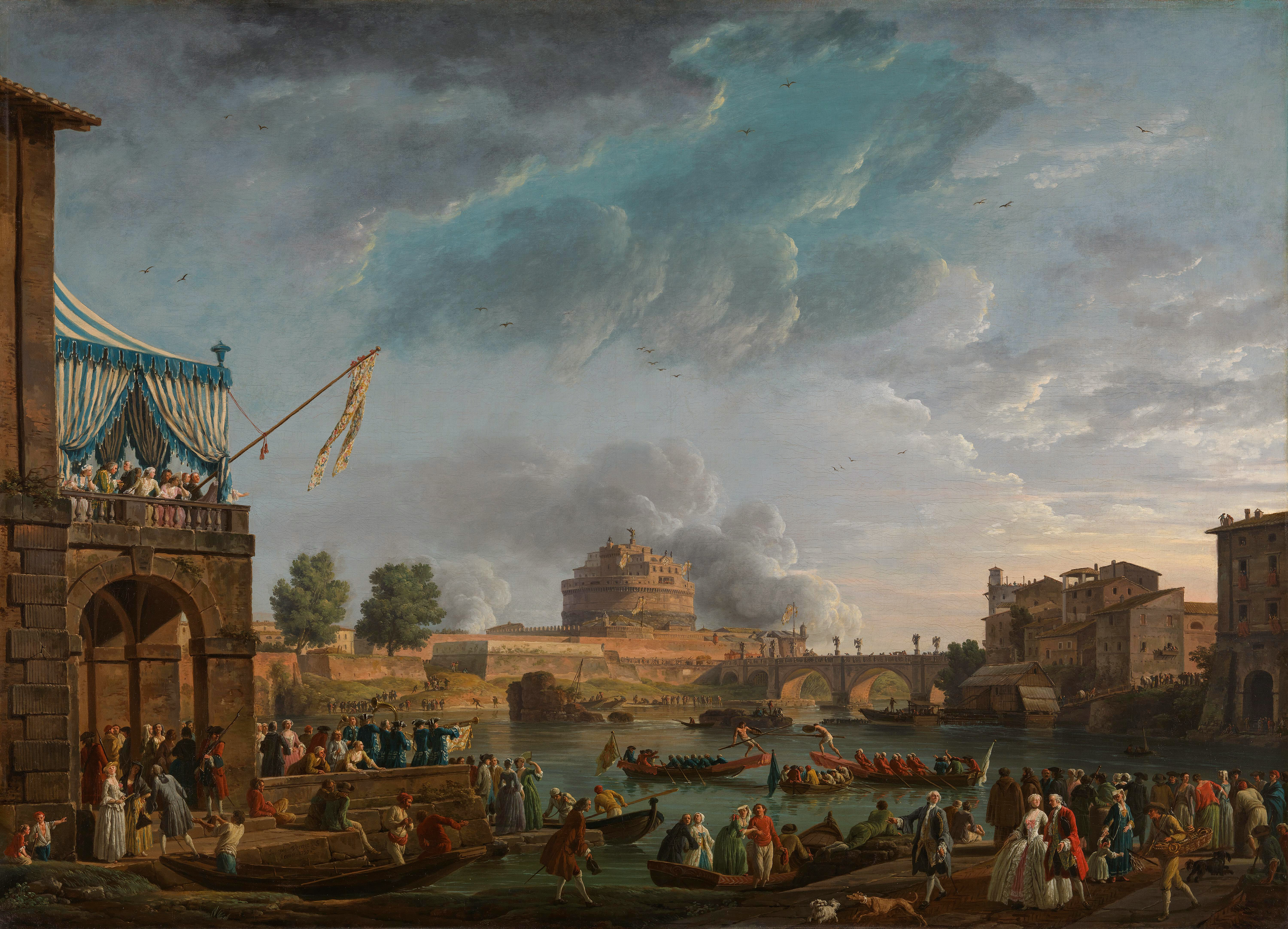
A Sporting Contest on the Tiber (1750), National Gallery, London

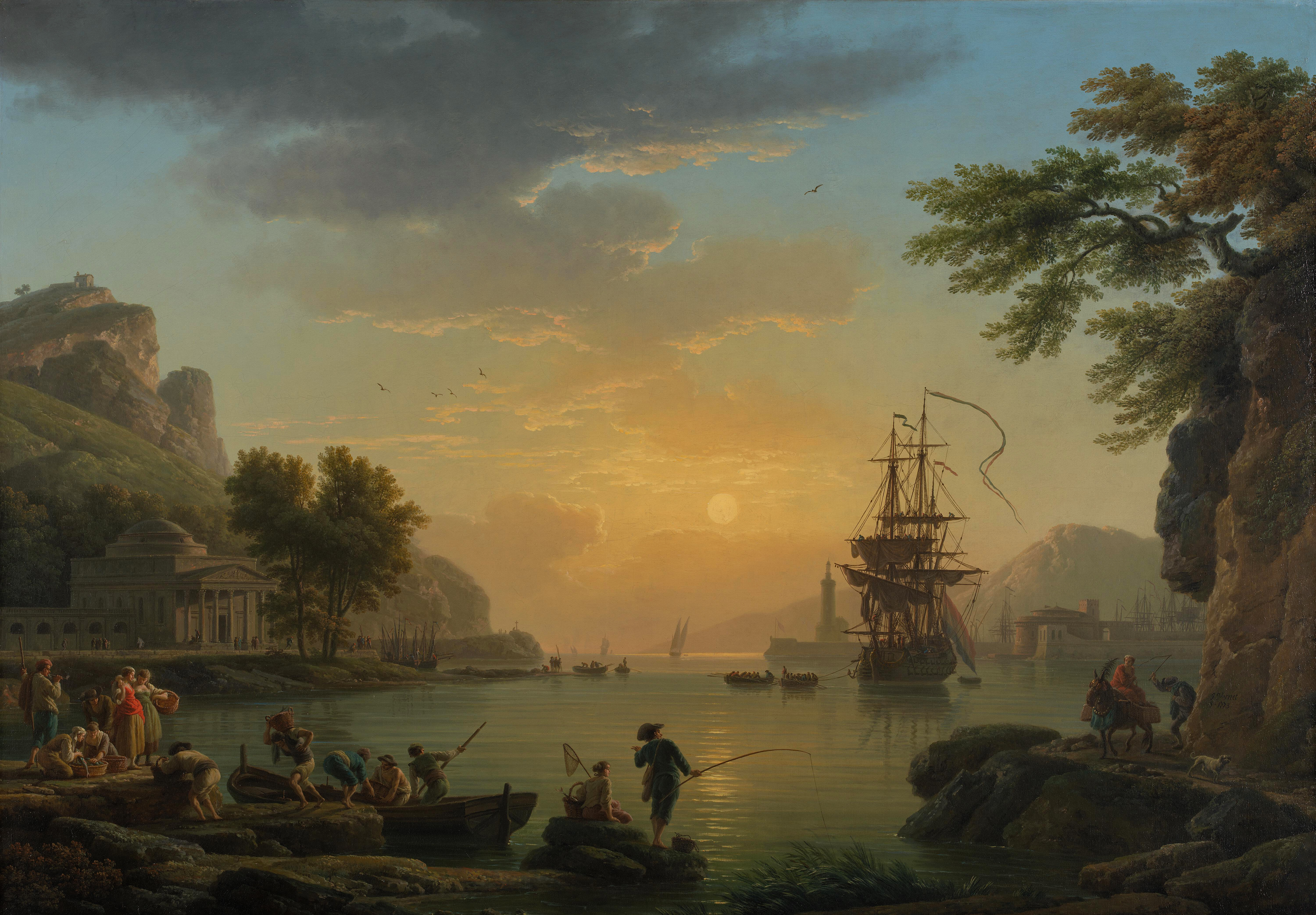
A Landscape at Sunset with Fishermen returning with their Catch (Calme) (1773), National Gallery, London

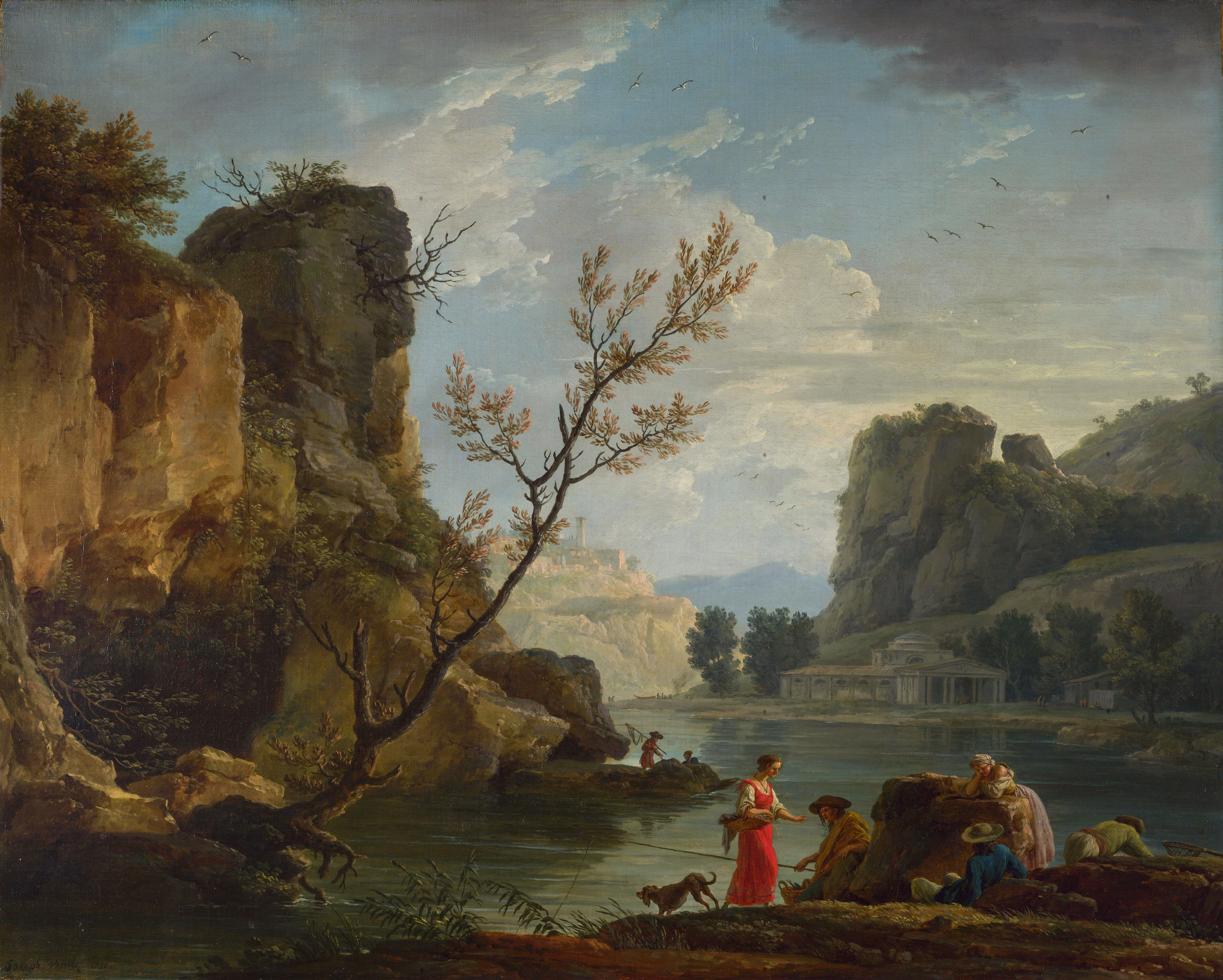
A River with Fishermen (1751), National Gallery, London

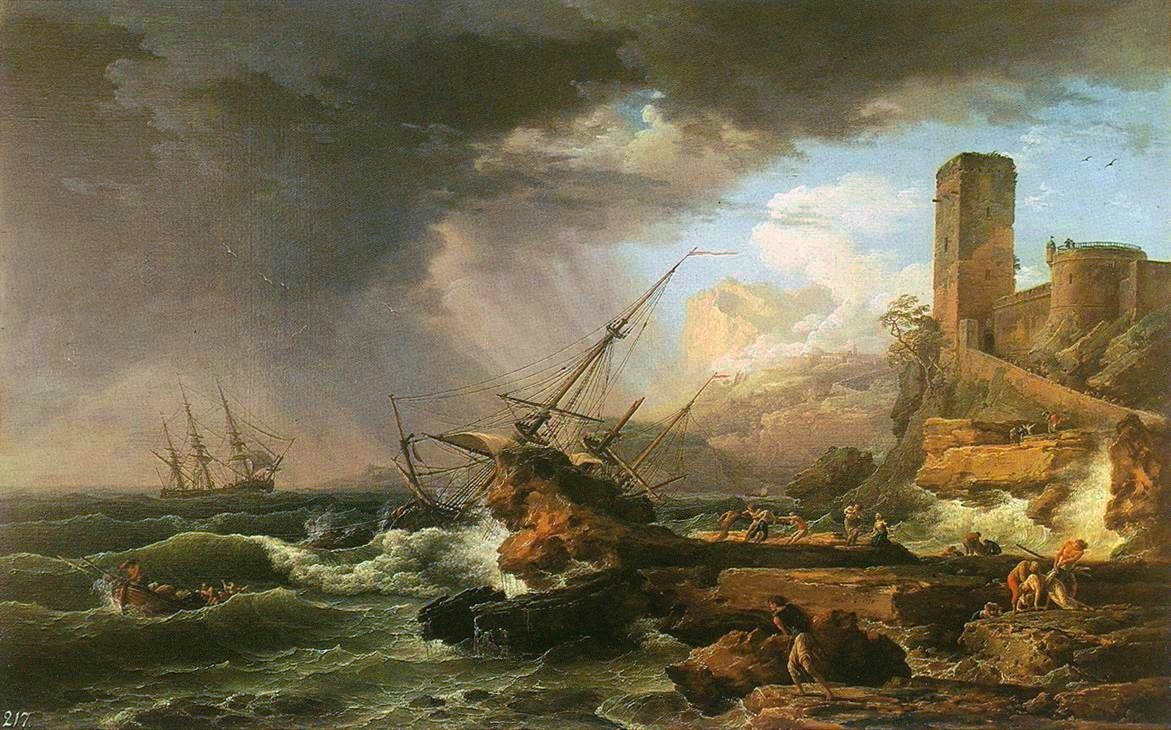
A Storm with a Shipwreck (1754), Wallace Collection

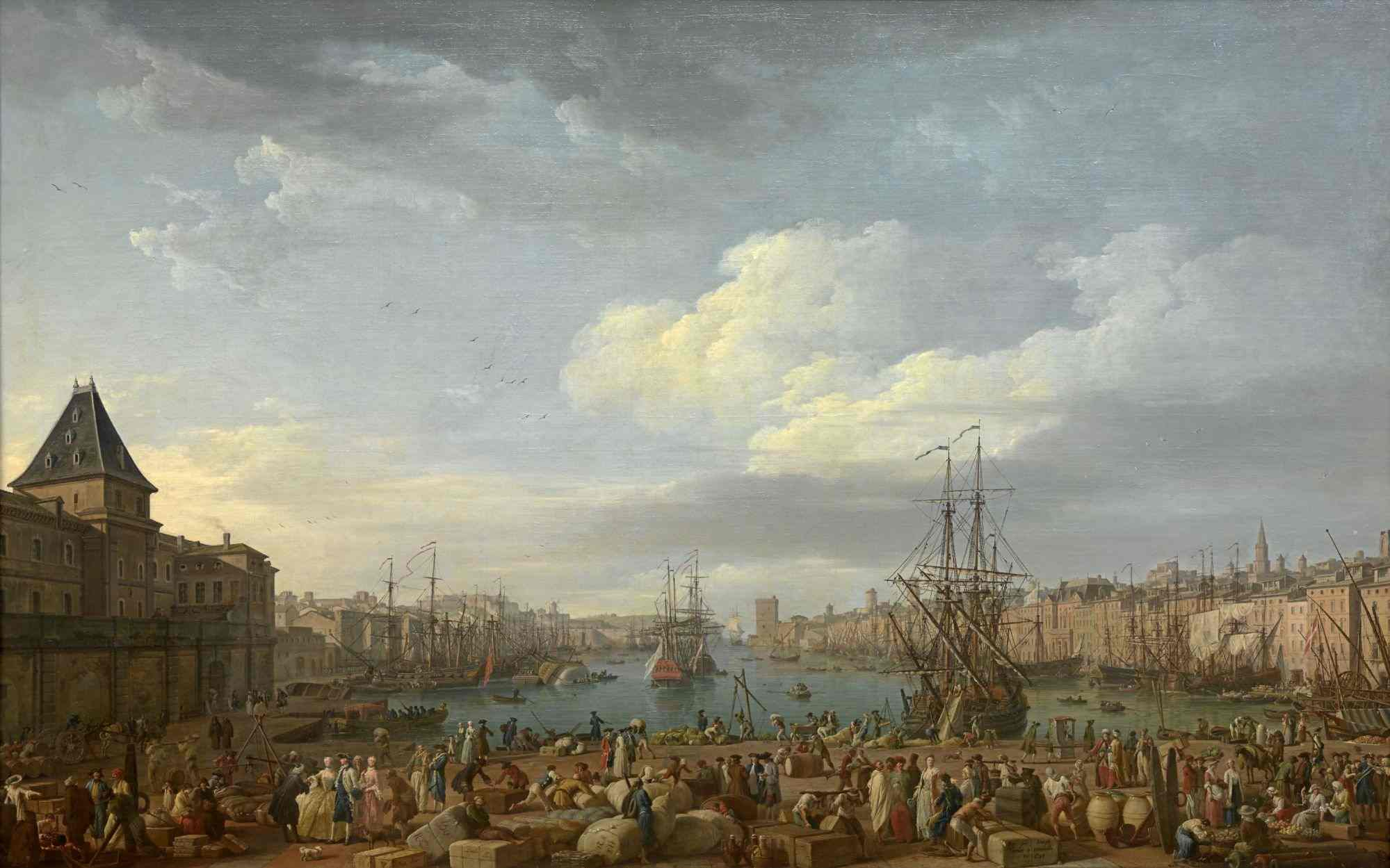
Interior of the Port of Marseille (1754), Louvre

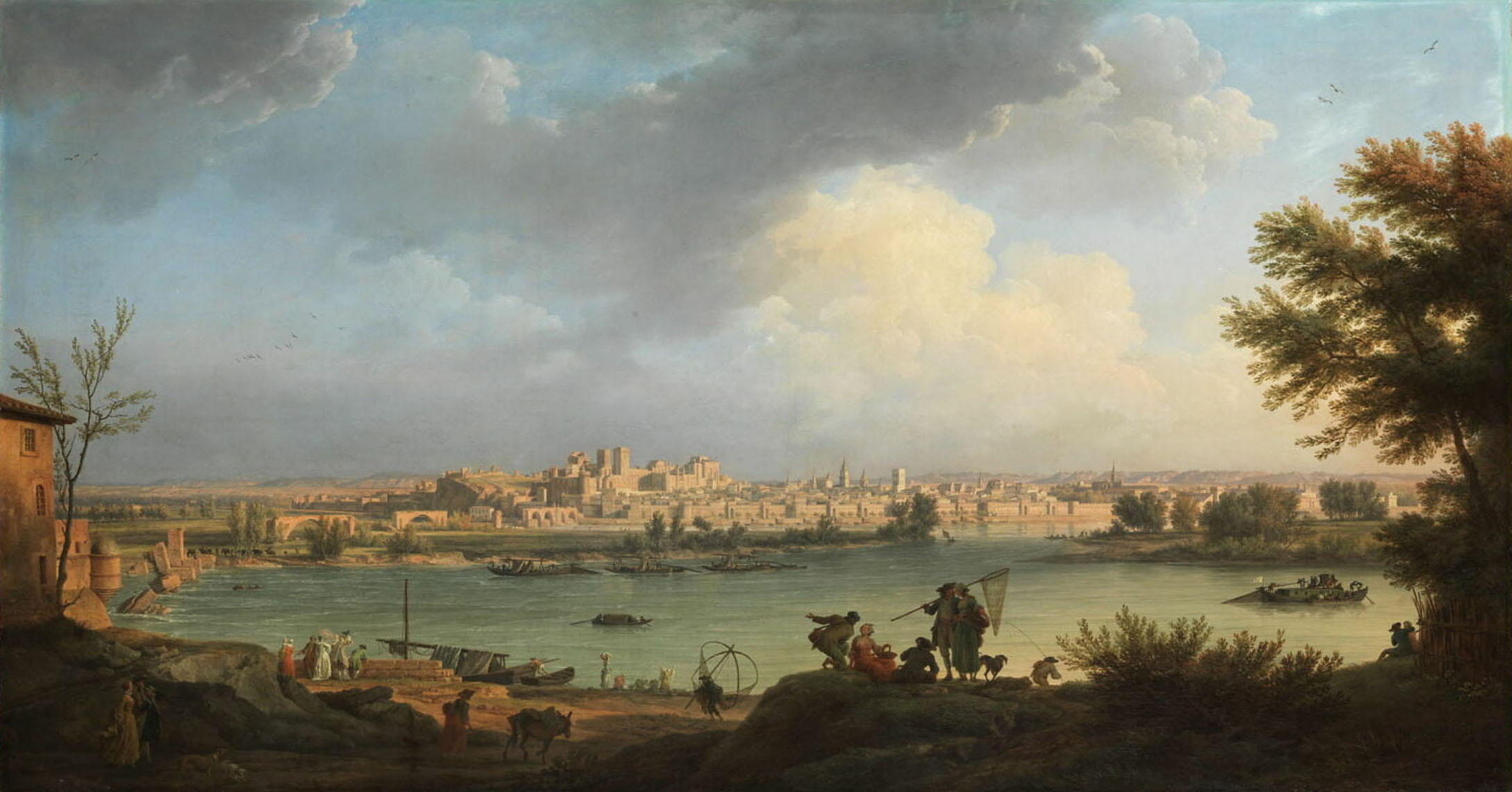
View of Avignon from the Right Bank of the Rhone (1757), Louvre

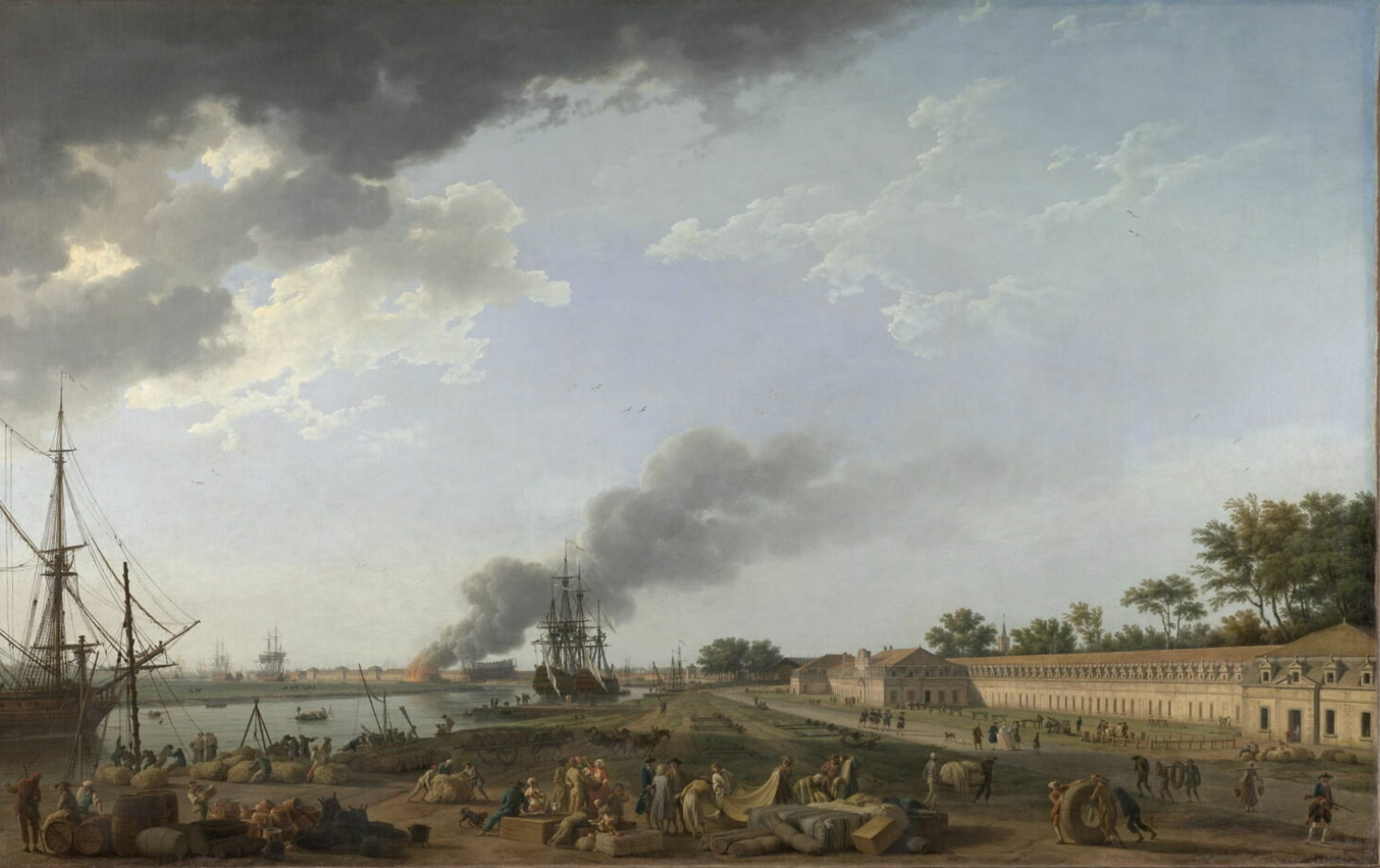
View of Rochefort Harbour from the Magasin des Colonies (1762), Louvre

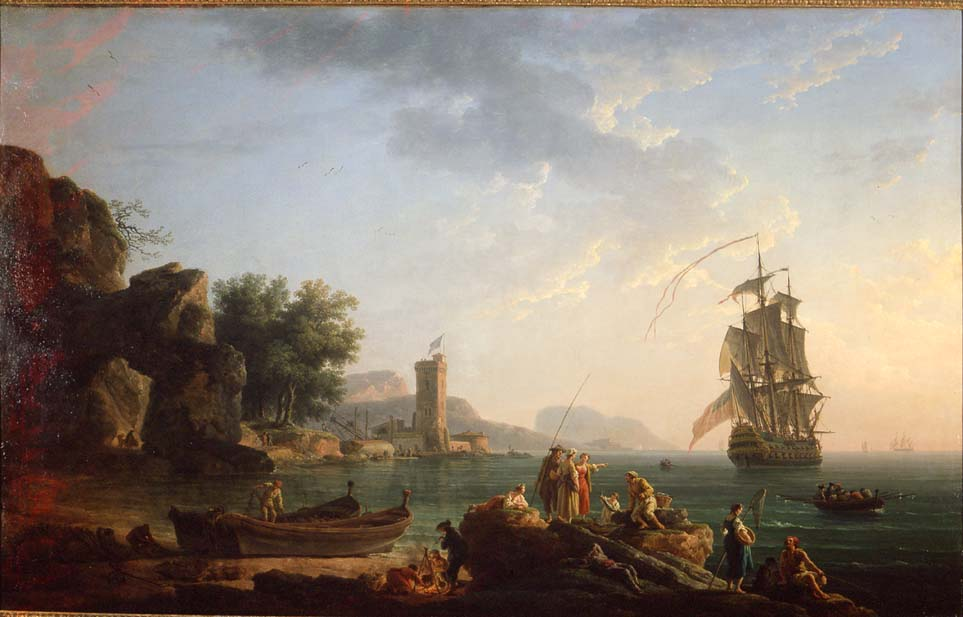
Coast Scene with a British Man of War (1766), Manchester Art Gallery

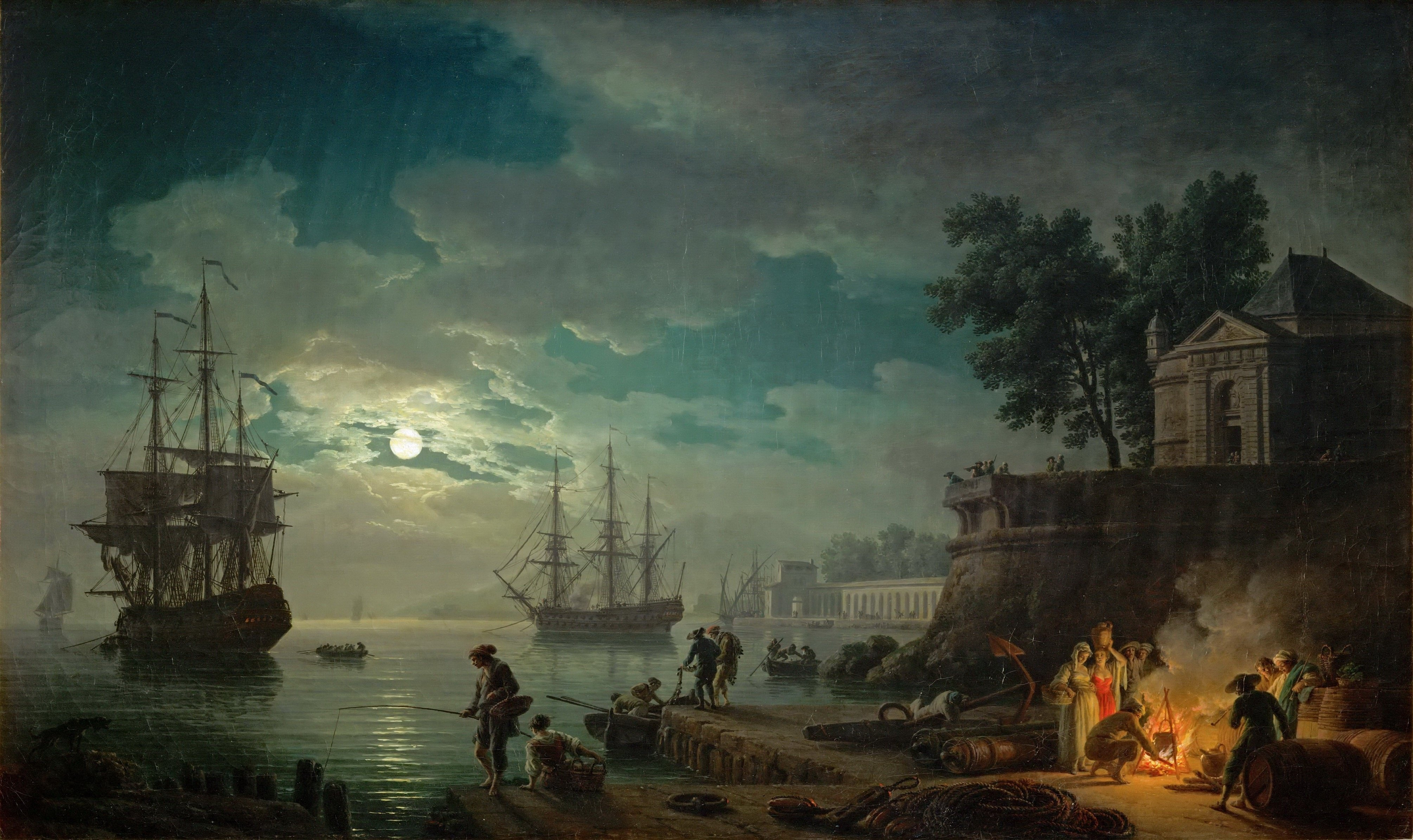
Seaport by Moonlight (1771), Louvre

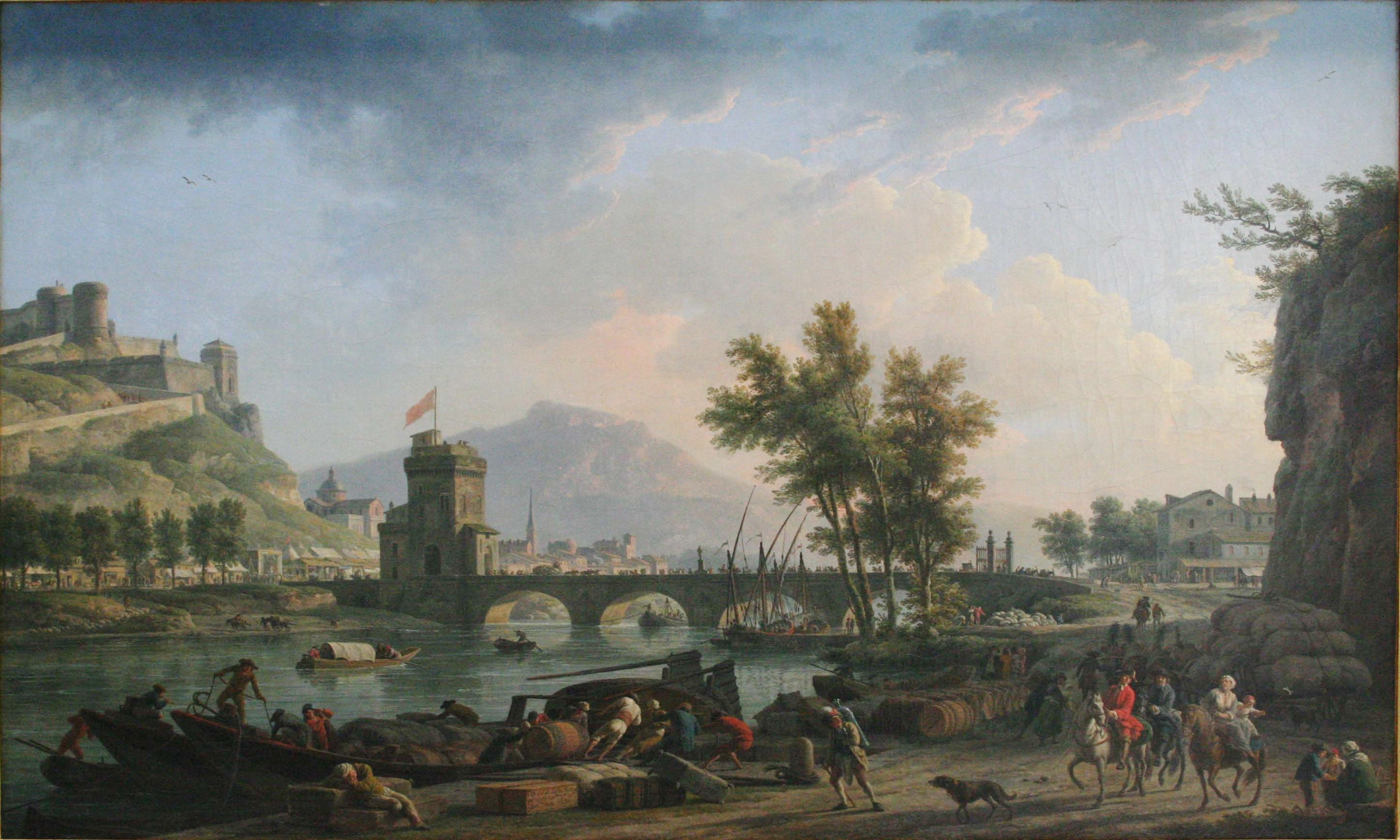
The Approach to a Fair (1774), Musée Fabre

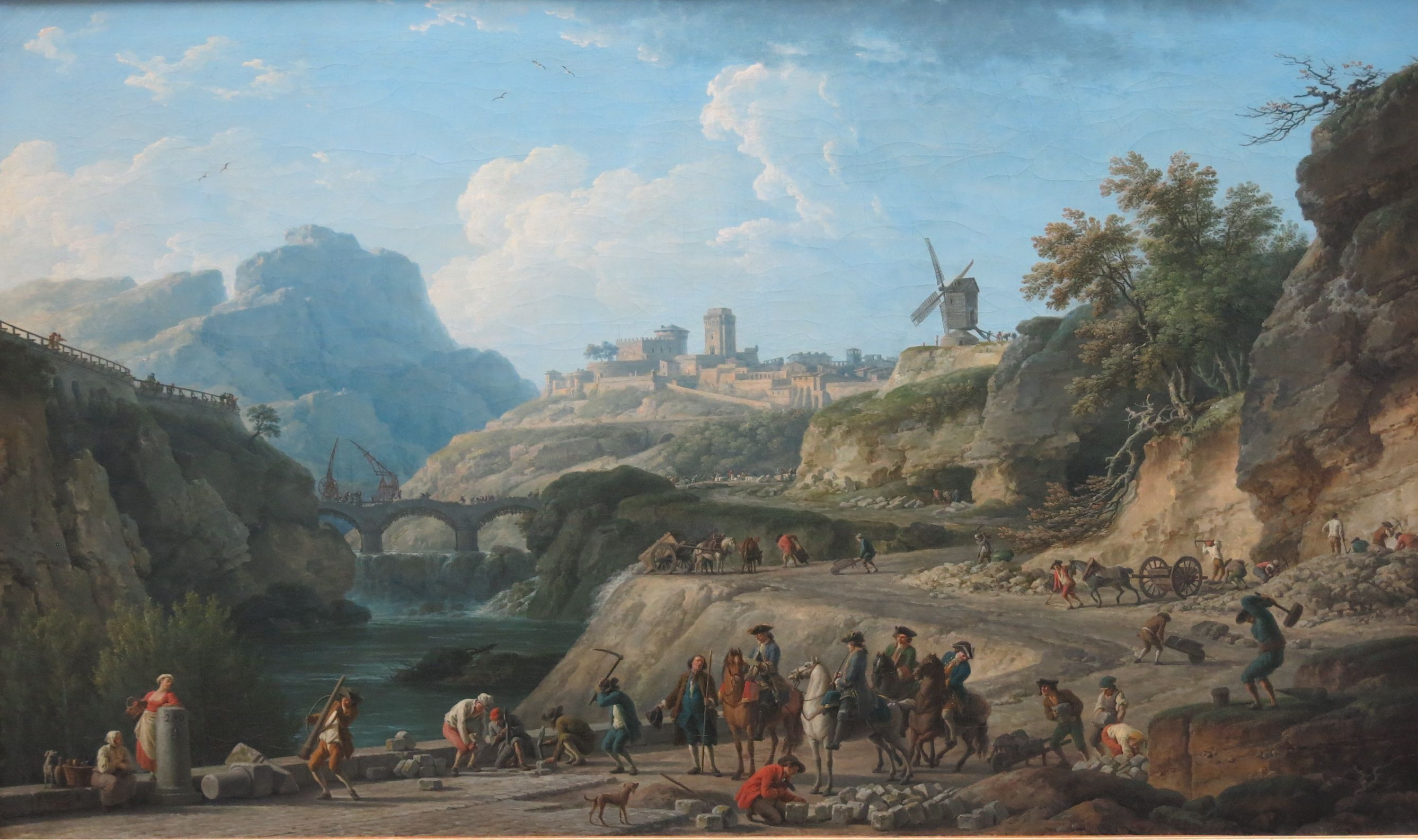
Constructing a Main Road (1774), Louvre

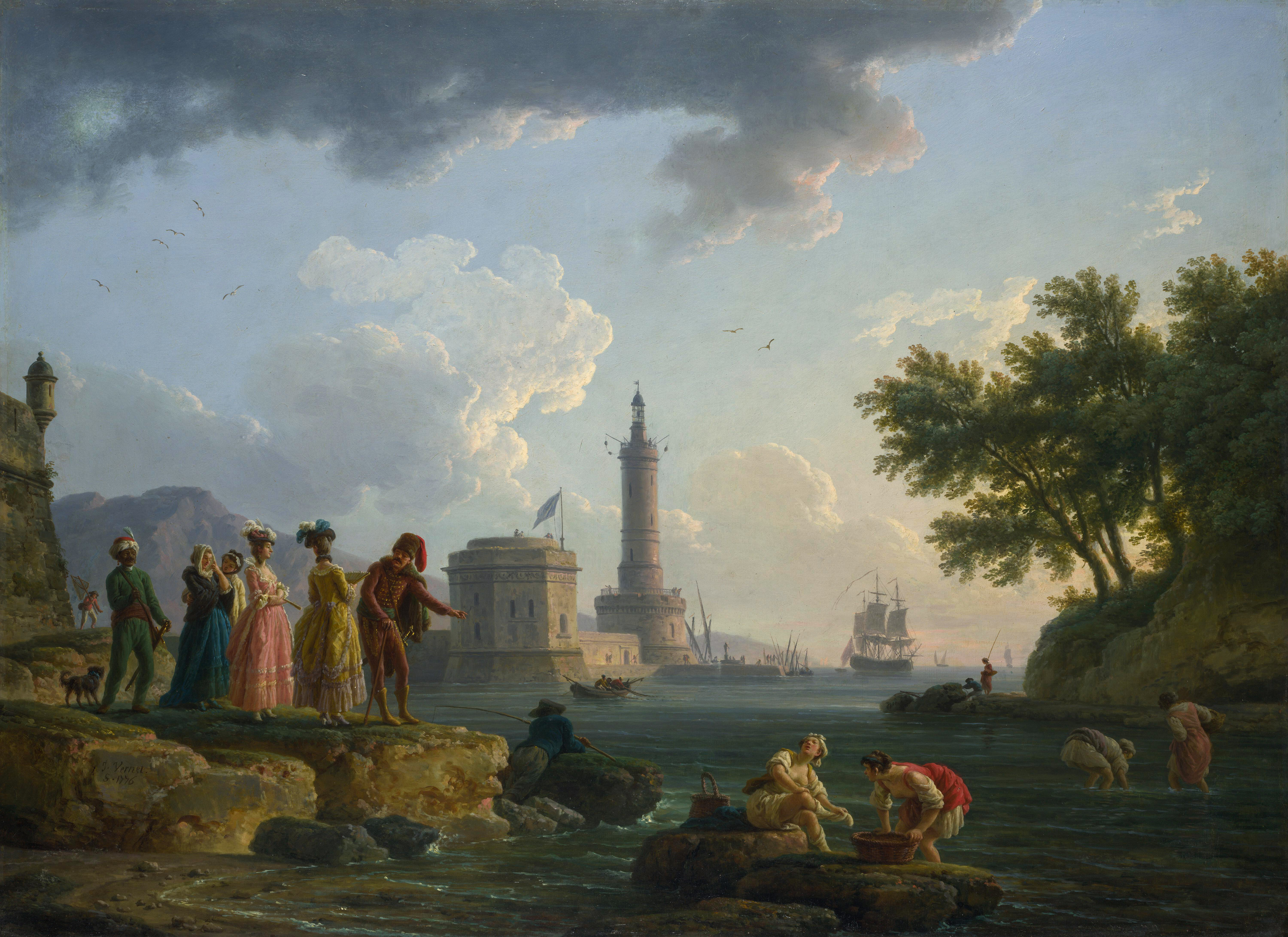
A Sea-shore (1776), National Gallery, London

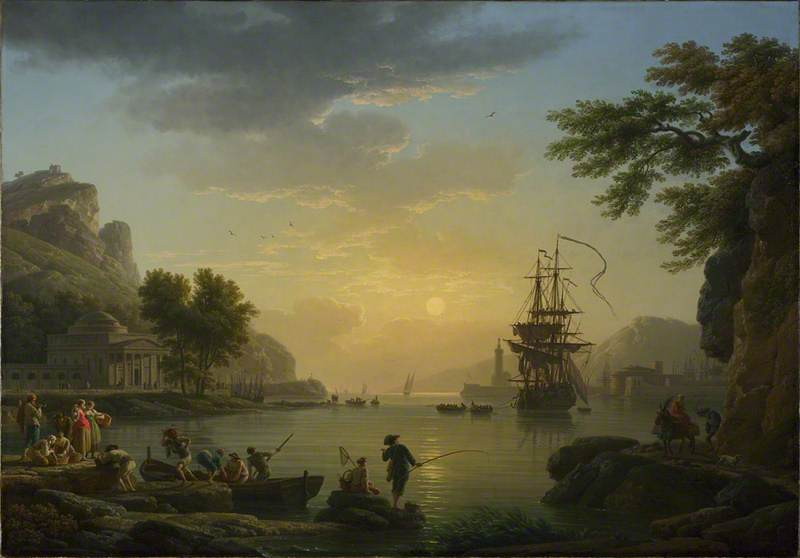
,A Landscape at Sunset, 1773

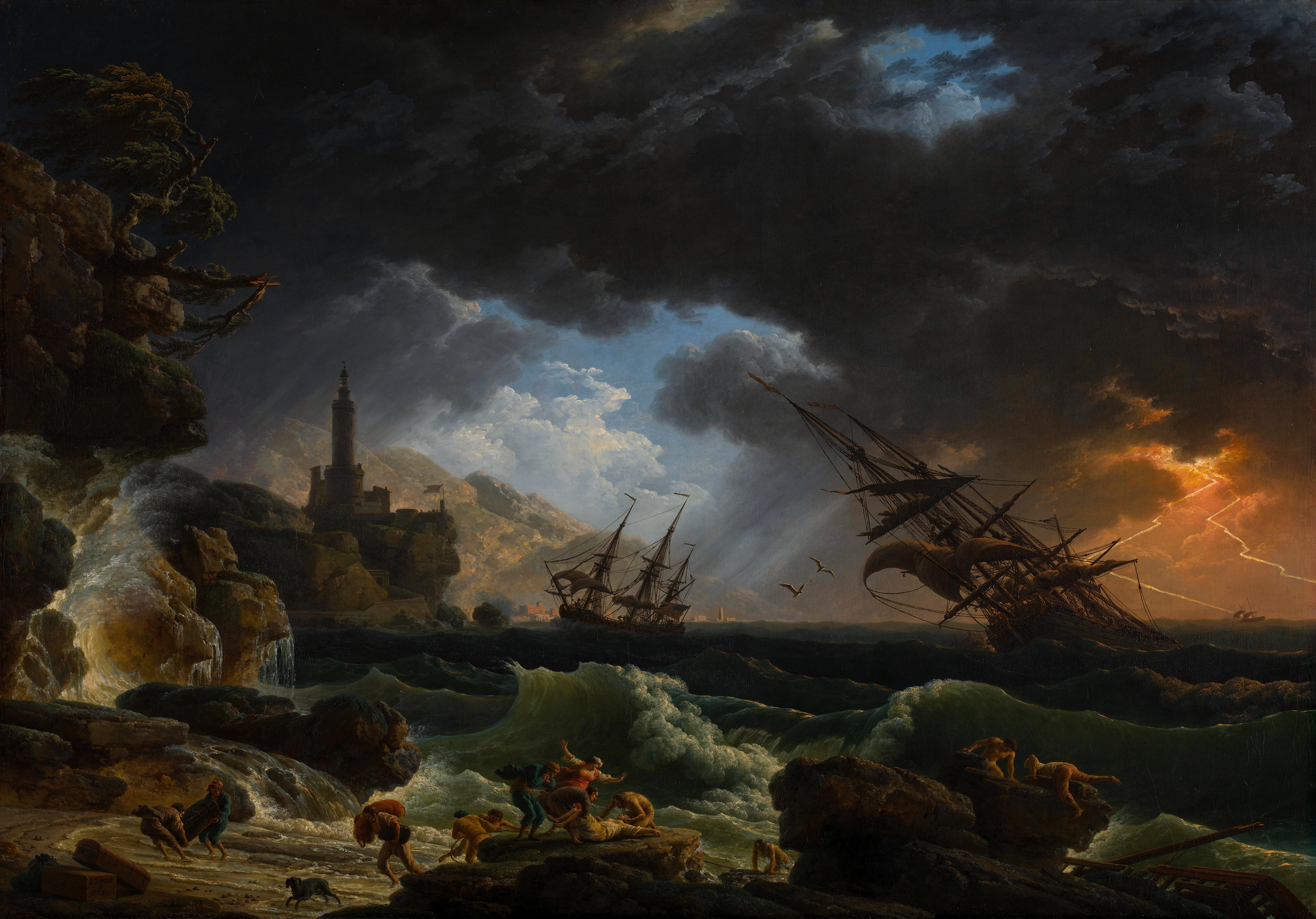
A Shipwreck in Stormy Seas (1773), National Gallery, London

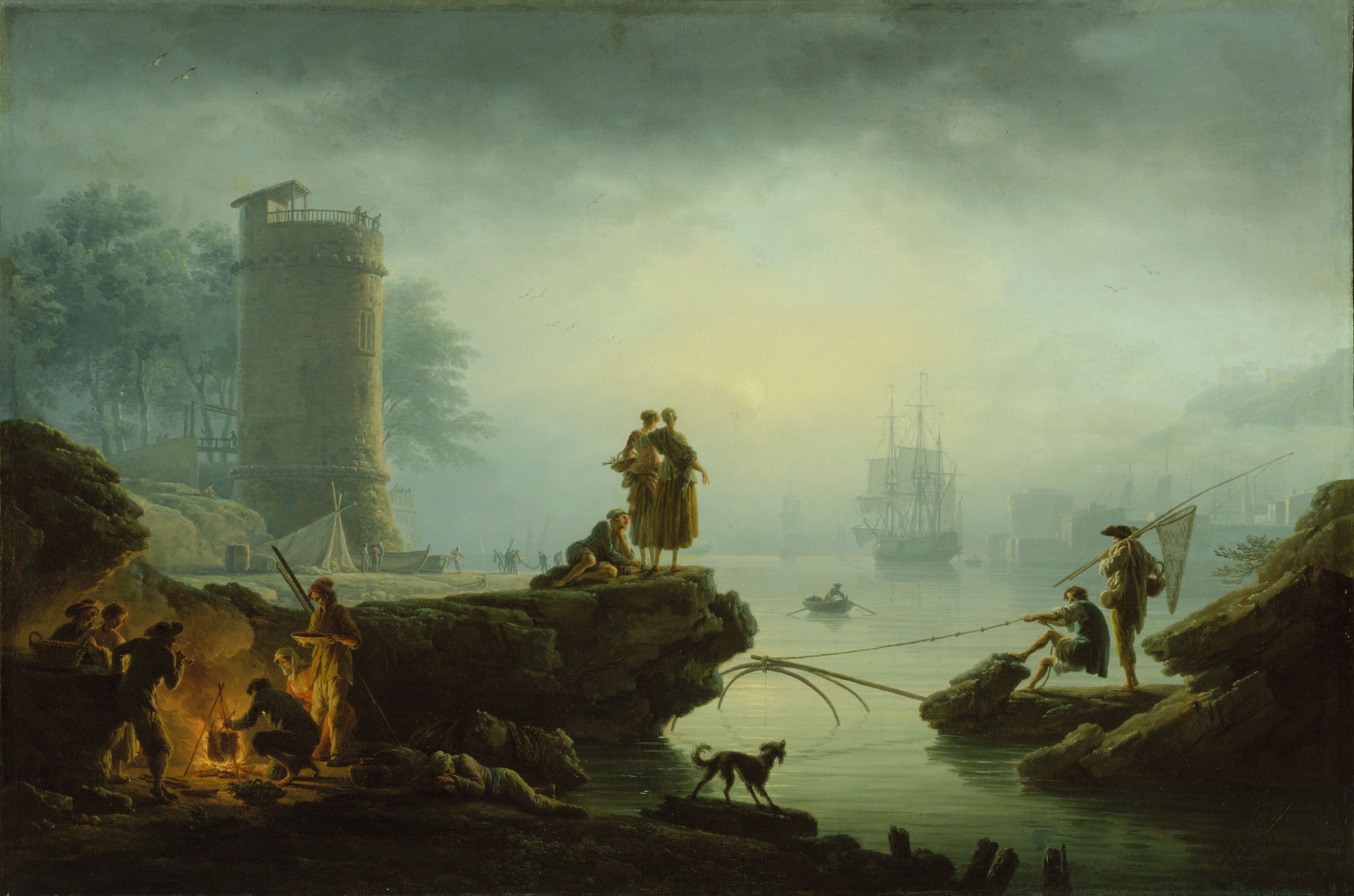
Morning (1760), Art Institute of Chicago

== Literary references ==
In Maria Wirtemberska's novel Malvina, or the Heart's Intuition (1816; English translation 2001, by Ursula Phillips), it is said that a view that is being described merits the talent of Vernet, who as the writer explains in her own footnote was a whale painter.

Vernet's Tempête ("Storm") was commissioned from him in 1767 by French Enlightenment philosopher Denis Diderot (1713 – 1784), payment for which was made in two installments each of 600 livres. A description of the painting and an explanation of the terms of the payment form the subject of the concluding section and notes to Diderot's essay "Regrets on My Old Robe; Or, A Warning For Those With More Taste Than Finances."

In "The Greek Interpreter" Arthur Conan Doyle has Sherlock Holmes say that his grandmother was the sister of "Vernet, the French artist."

== Sources ==
- "Vernet, Claude Joseph, Called Joseph". Benezit Dictionary of Artists. 2011.
- Conisbee, Philip (2003). "Vernet, (Claude-)Joseph". Grove Art Online.
