= A Shipwreck in Stormy Seas =

Painting by Claude-Joseph Vernet

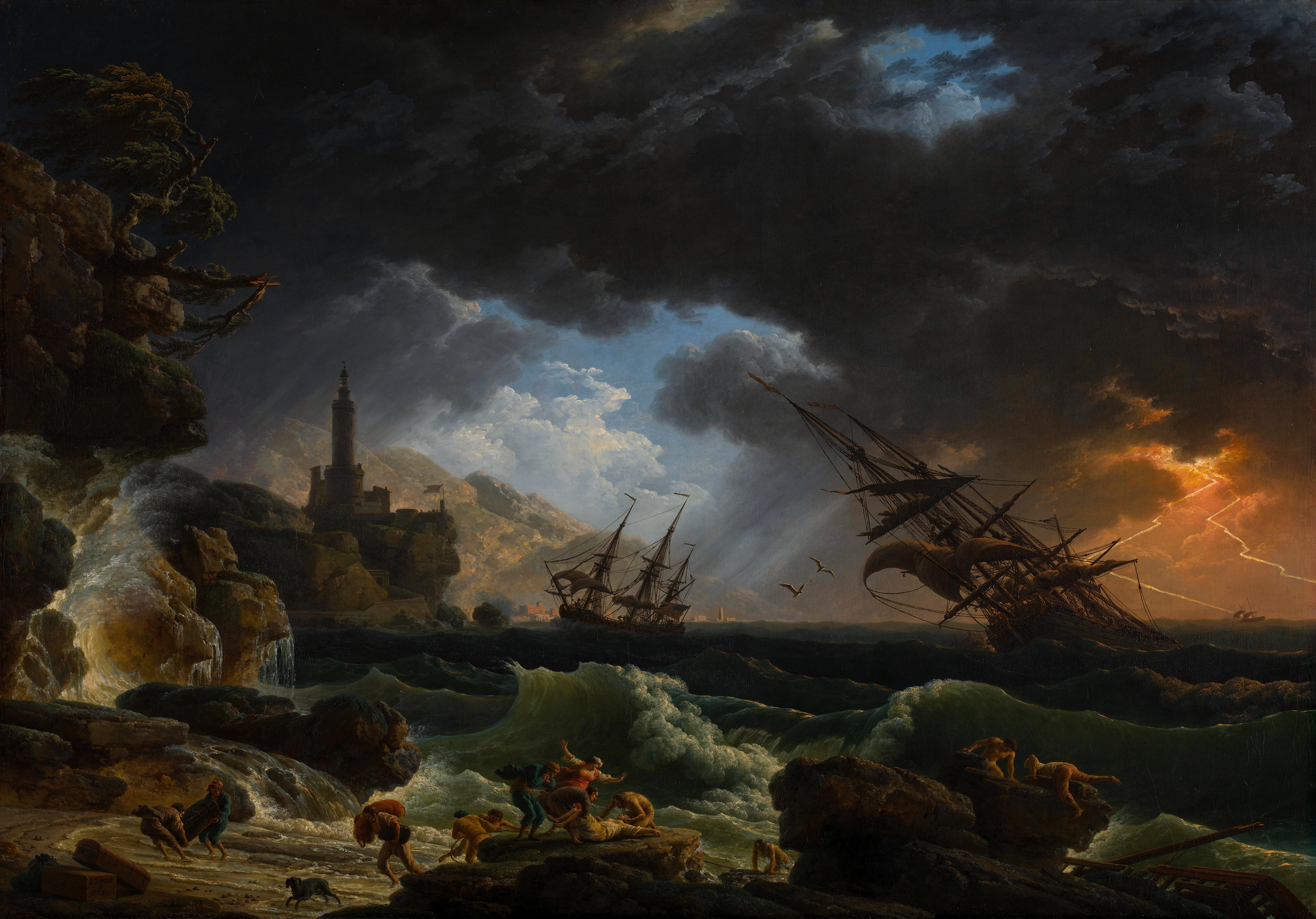
- Artist: Claude-Joseph Vernet
- Year: 1773
- Type: Oil on canvas, landscape painting
- Dimensions: 114.5 cm × 163.5 cm (45.1 in × 64.4 in)
- Location: National Gallery; London

A Shipwreck in Stormy Seas (French: Tempête) is an oil on canvas seascape painting by the French artist Claude-Joseph Vernet, from 1773. He was known for his maritime art, such as his Views of the Ports of France series. The painting depicts a shipwreck.

== History ==
It was one of two works commissioned by the King of Poland Stanisław August Poniatowski showing contrasting weather during seascapes, the other was originally titled Calme but is now known as a A Landscape at Sunset. When the king was slow with payments, Vernet instead sold them to the British soldier Robert Clive. Clive had earlier expressed interest in other paintings by the artist which he had seen at the Salon of 1771 in Paris. Today the painting is in the possession of the National Gallery in London, one of five paintings by Vernet in the collection including its companion piece A Landscape at Sunset and A Sporting Contest on the Tiber. It was acquired in 2004. An engraving of the painting was produced by Daniel Lerpinière and published by John Boydell in 1782.

== Bibliography ==
- Barker, Emma. Art & Visual Culture 1600-1850: Academy to Avant-Gard. Tate Enterprises, 2013.
- Della Dora, Veronica. Where Light in Darkness Lies: The Story of the Lighthouse. Reaktion Books, 2022.
- Goedde, Lawrence Otto. Tempest and Shipwreck in Dutch and Flemish Art: Convention, Rhetoric, and Interpretation. Pennsylvania State University Press, 1989.
