= Portrait of Joseph Vernet =

Painting by Élisabeth Vigée Le Brun

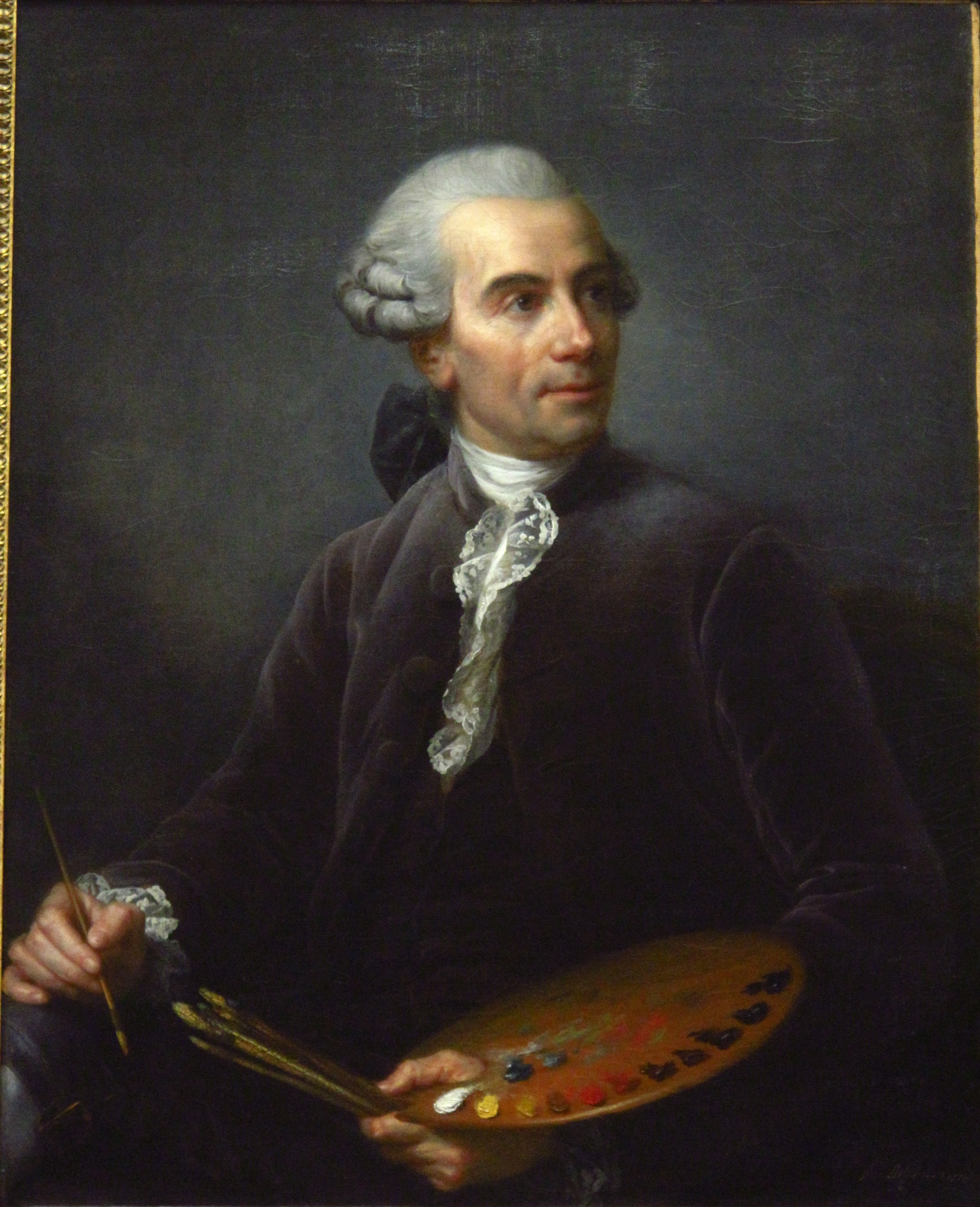
- Artist: Élisabeth Vigée Le Brun
- Year: 1778
- Type: Oil on canvas, portrait painting
- Dimensions: 90 cm × 79 cm (35 in × 31 in)
- Location: Louvre; Paris

Portrait of Joseph Vernet is an oil on canvas portrait painting by the French artist Élisabeth Vigée Le Brun, from 1778. It depicts her fellow painter Joseph Vernet. A noted producer of marine art, known for his Views of the Ports of France of series, Vernet was the father and grandfather of the artists Carle Vernet and Horace Vernet. Le Brun depicts him with an palette and paint brush. It was one of her earliest portraits and features a painter who had been supportive of her.

Today the painting is in the collection of the Louvre, in Paris, having been acquired in 1817.

== See also ==
- Portrait of Carle Vernet, an 1801 portrait of Joseph's son Robert Lefèvre

== Bibliography ==
- Baillio, Joseph & Baetjer, Katharine & Lang, Paul. Vigée Le Brun. Metropolitan Museum of Art, 2016.
- May, Gita. Elisabeth Vigée Le Brun: The Odyssey of an Artist in an Age of Revolution. Yale University Press, 2008.
