= Salon of 1755 =

1755 art exhibition in Paris

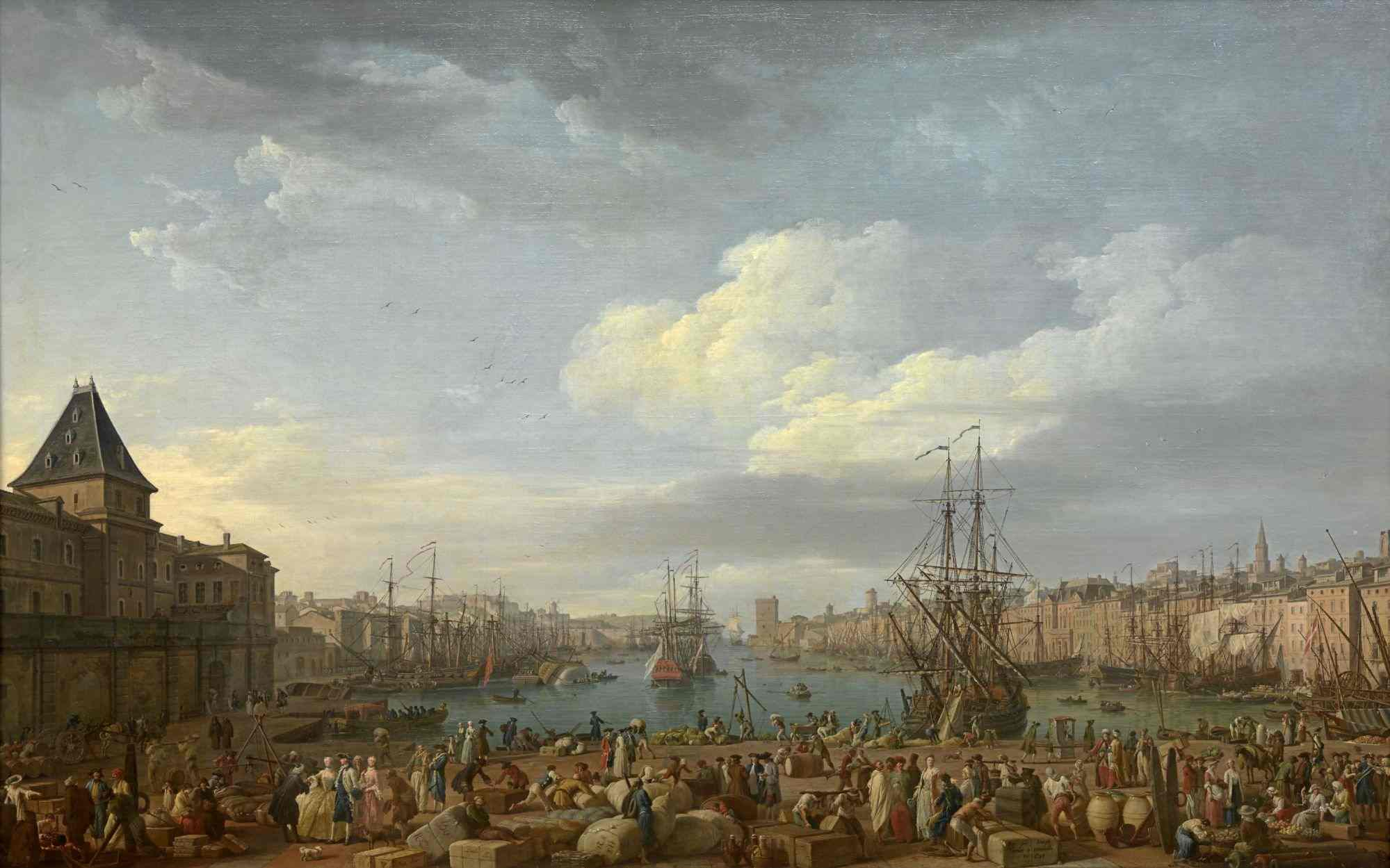
Interior of the Port of Marseille by Claude-Joseph Vernet

The Salon of 1755 was an art exhibition held at the Louvre in Paris. Open between 25 August and 25 September 1755, it was organised by the Académie Royale as the latest edition of the biannual Salon. It featured submissions from many of the leading artists and architects of the mid-eighteenth century Ancien régime period. It was held the year before the formal outbreak of the Seven Years' War, although fighting had already begun in North America. Madame de Pompadour was then at the height of her influence, and her brother the Marquis de Marigny was head of the Bâtiments du Roi and influential in the artworld.

Maurice Quentin de La Tour displayed a pastel portrait of Madame de Pompadour. Claude-Joseph Vernet exhibited several of his well-known seascapes including Interior of the Port of Marseille from his Views of the Ports of France series of paintings, commissioned by Louis XV. Vernet's A Storm with a Shipwreck, commissioned by Pompadour's brother Marquis de Marigny is now in the Wallace Collection.

== Gallery ==
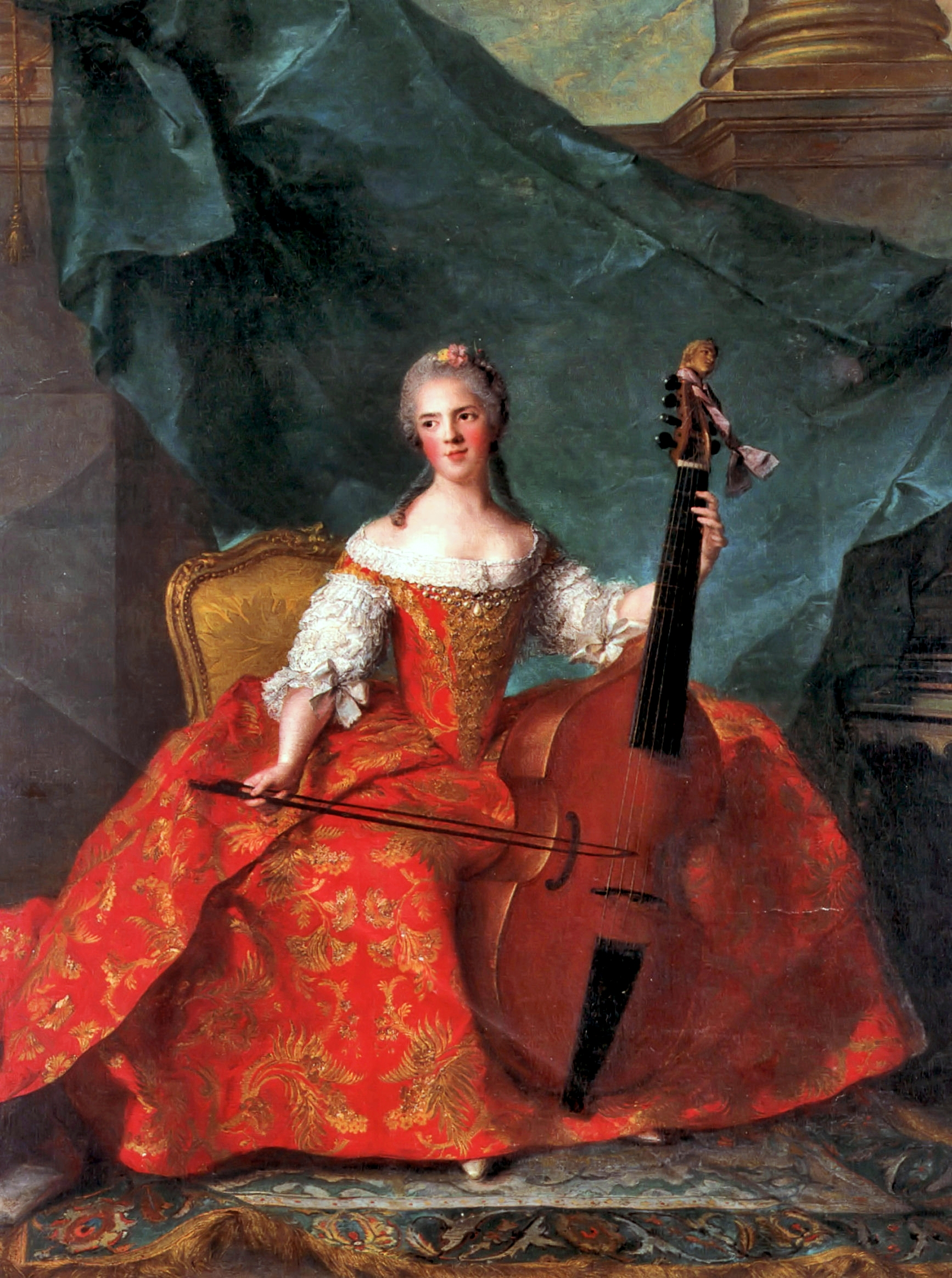
Madame Henriette Playing the Viola by Jean-Marc Nattier

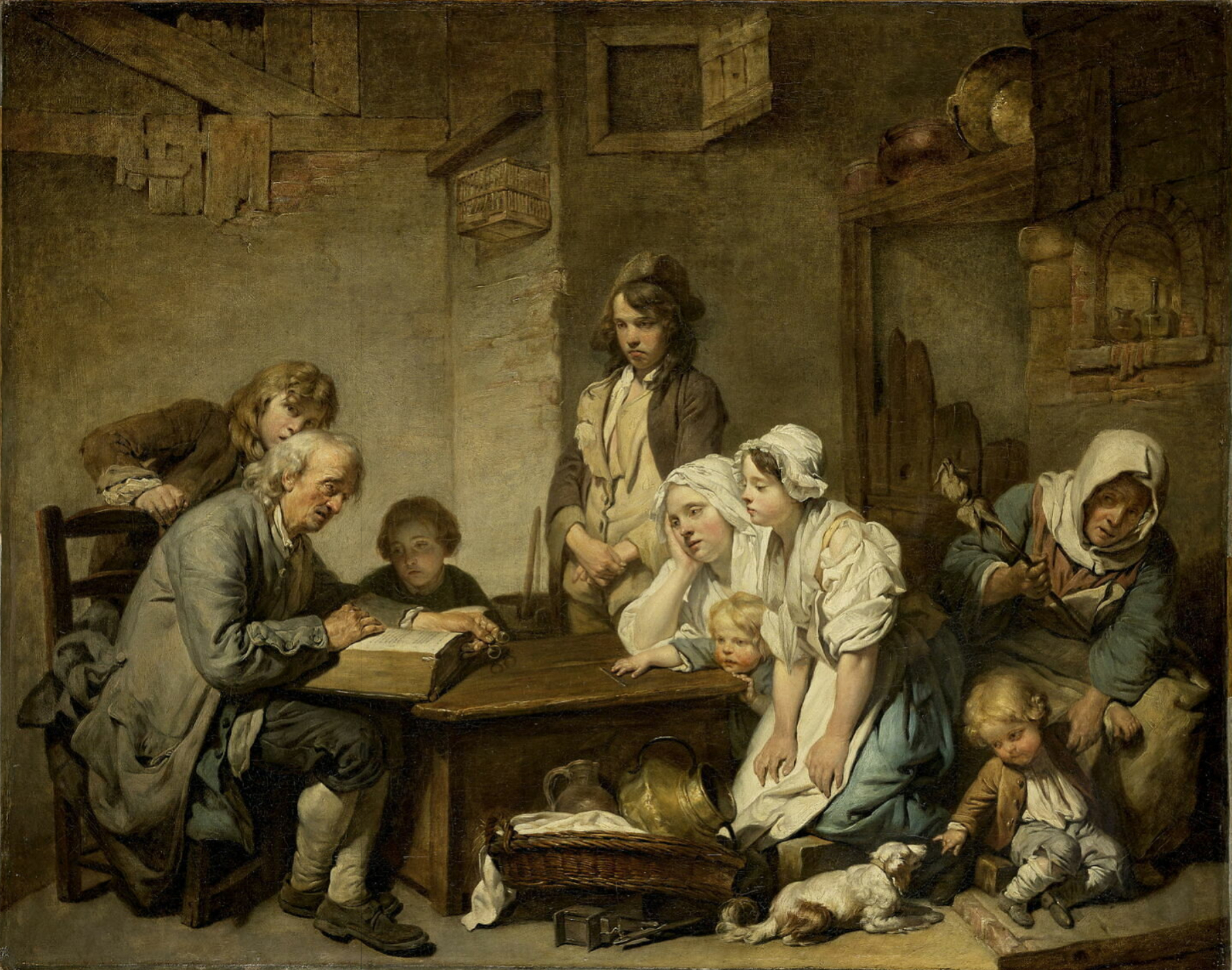
The Bible Reading by Jean-Baptiste Greuze

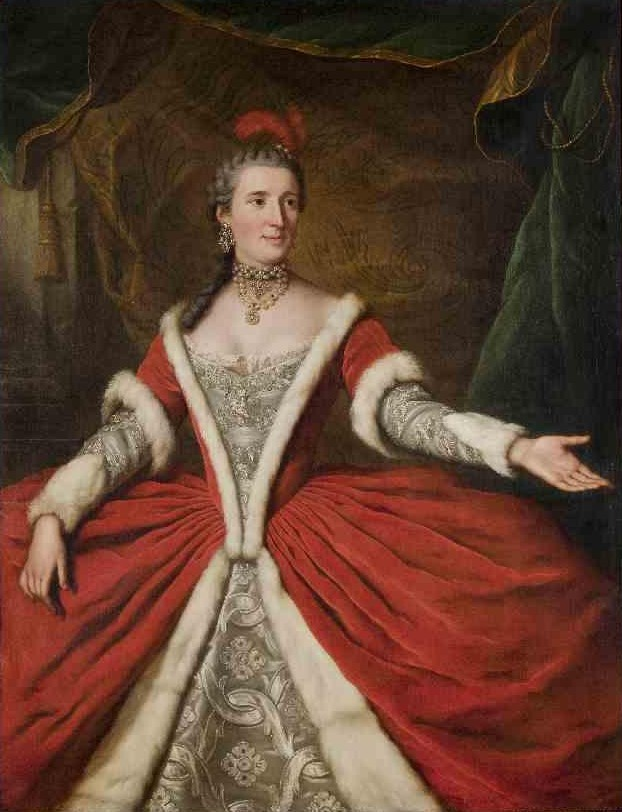
Marie Dumesnil in the Role of Agrippina in Britannicus by Donat Nonnotte

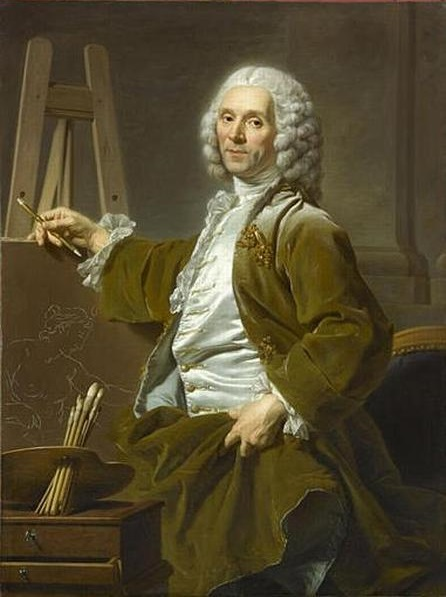
Portrait of Hyacinthe Collin de Vermont by Alexander Roslin

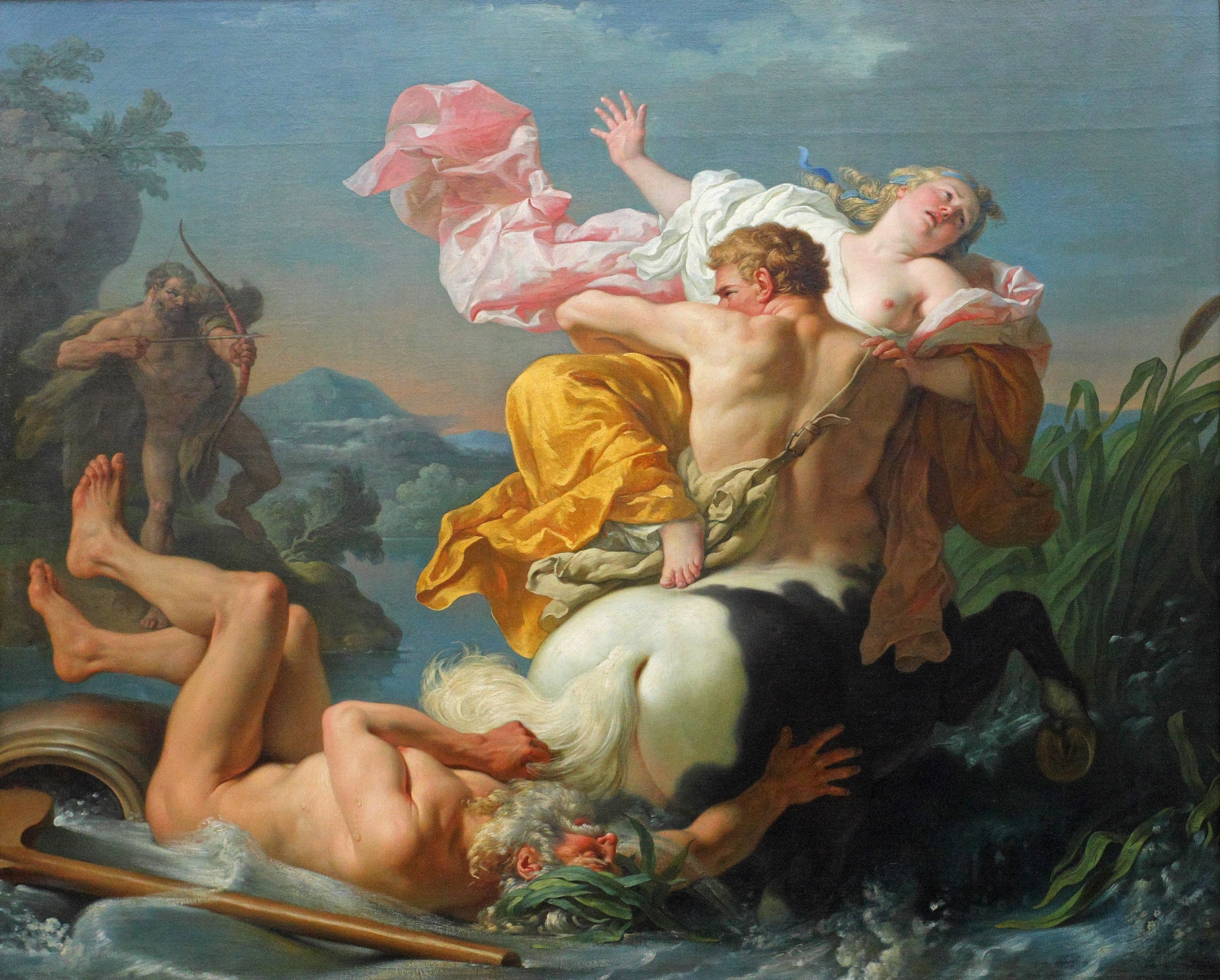
The Abduction of Deianeira by the Centaur Nessus by Louis-Jean-François Lagrenée

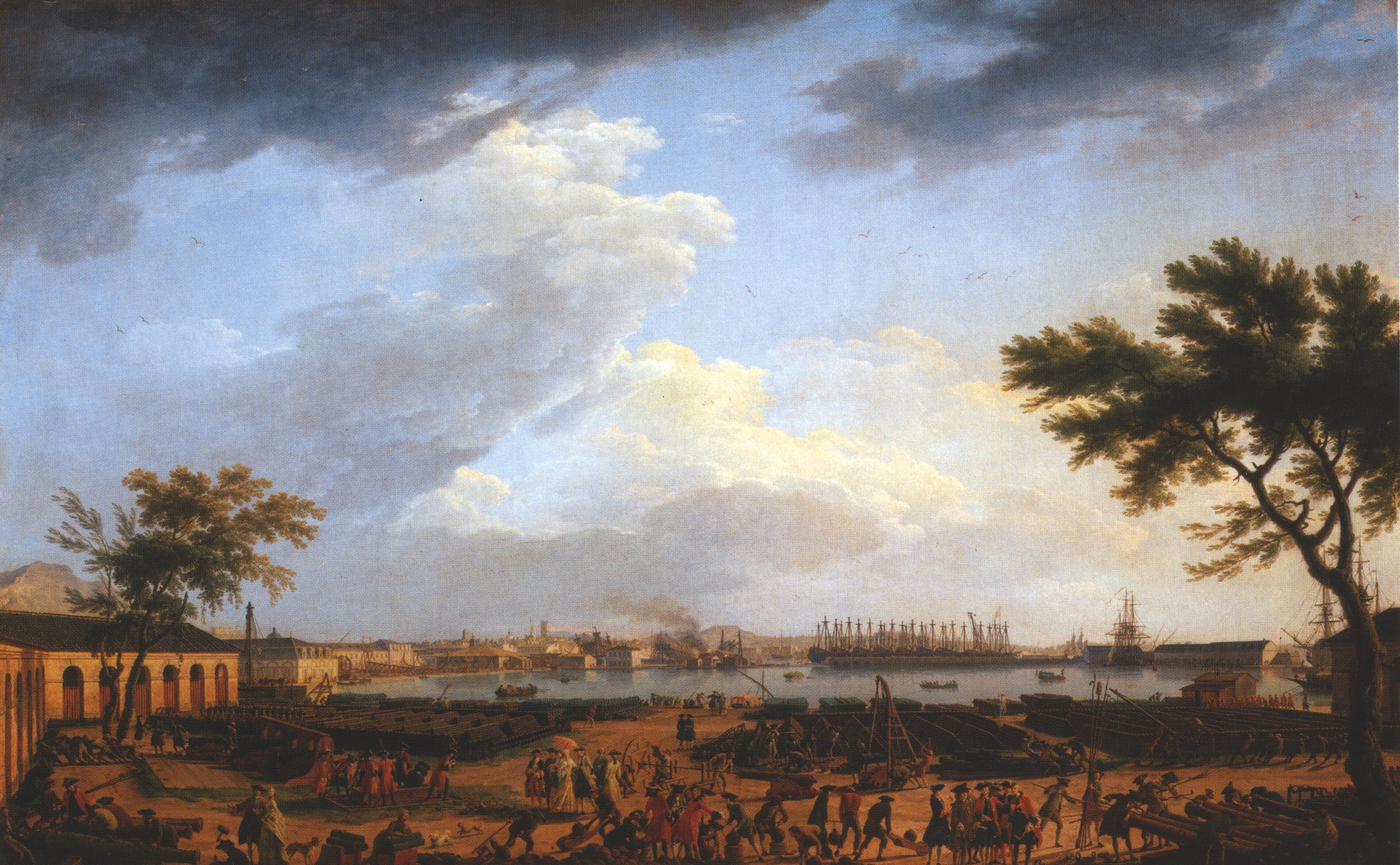
View of the Harbour of Toulon by Claude-Joseph Vernet

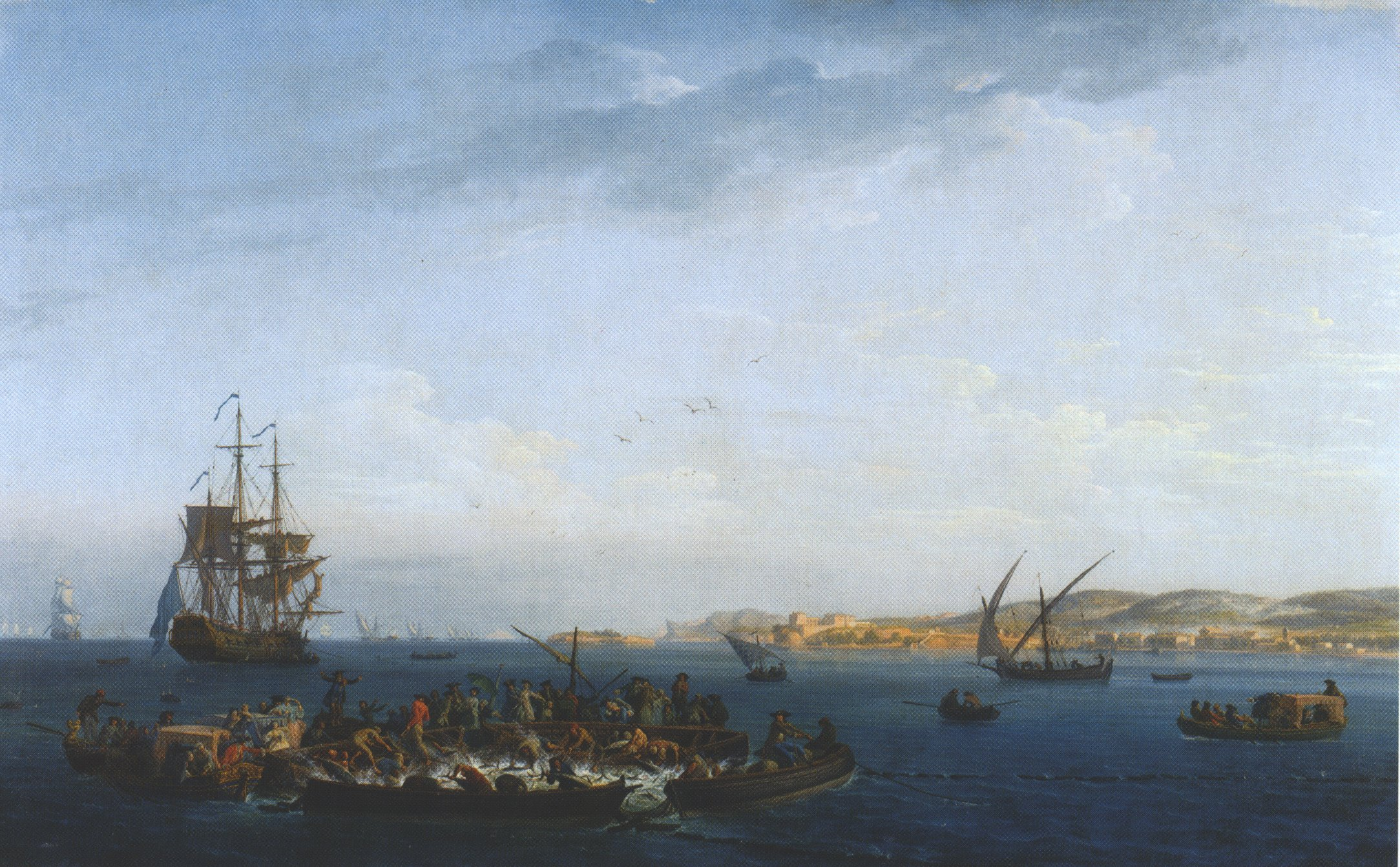
View of the Bay of Bandol by Claude-Joseph Vernet

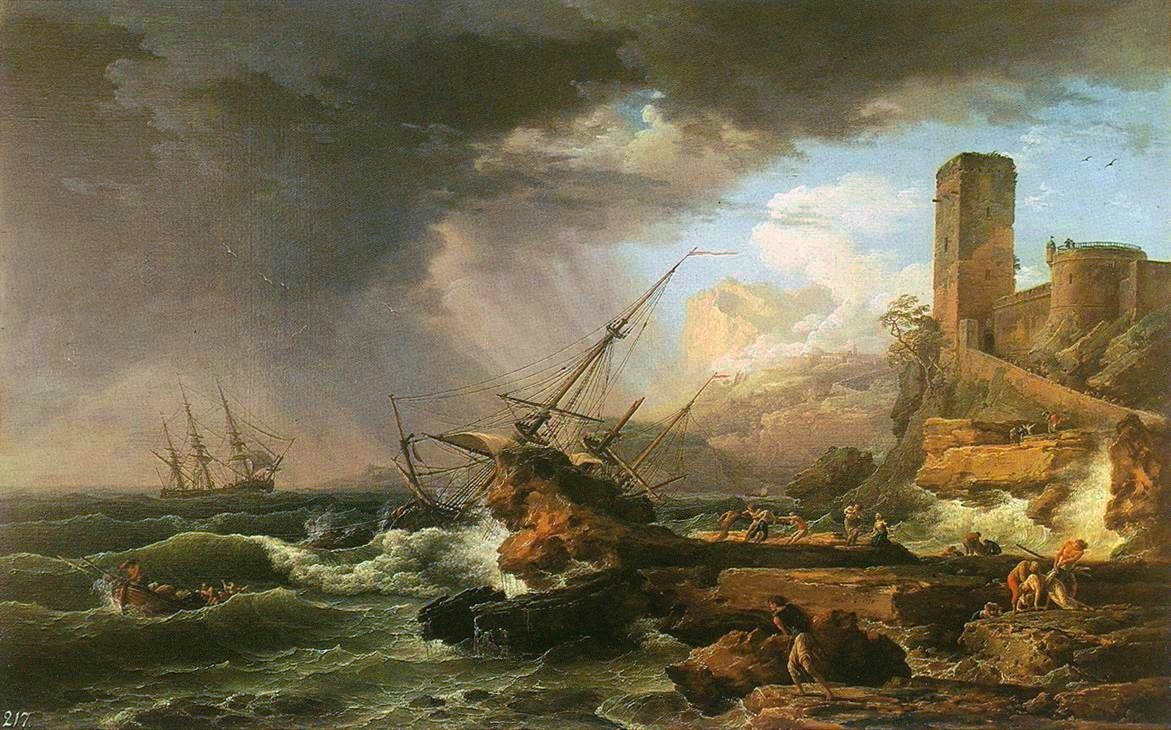
A Storm with a Shipwreck by Claude-Joseph Vernet

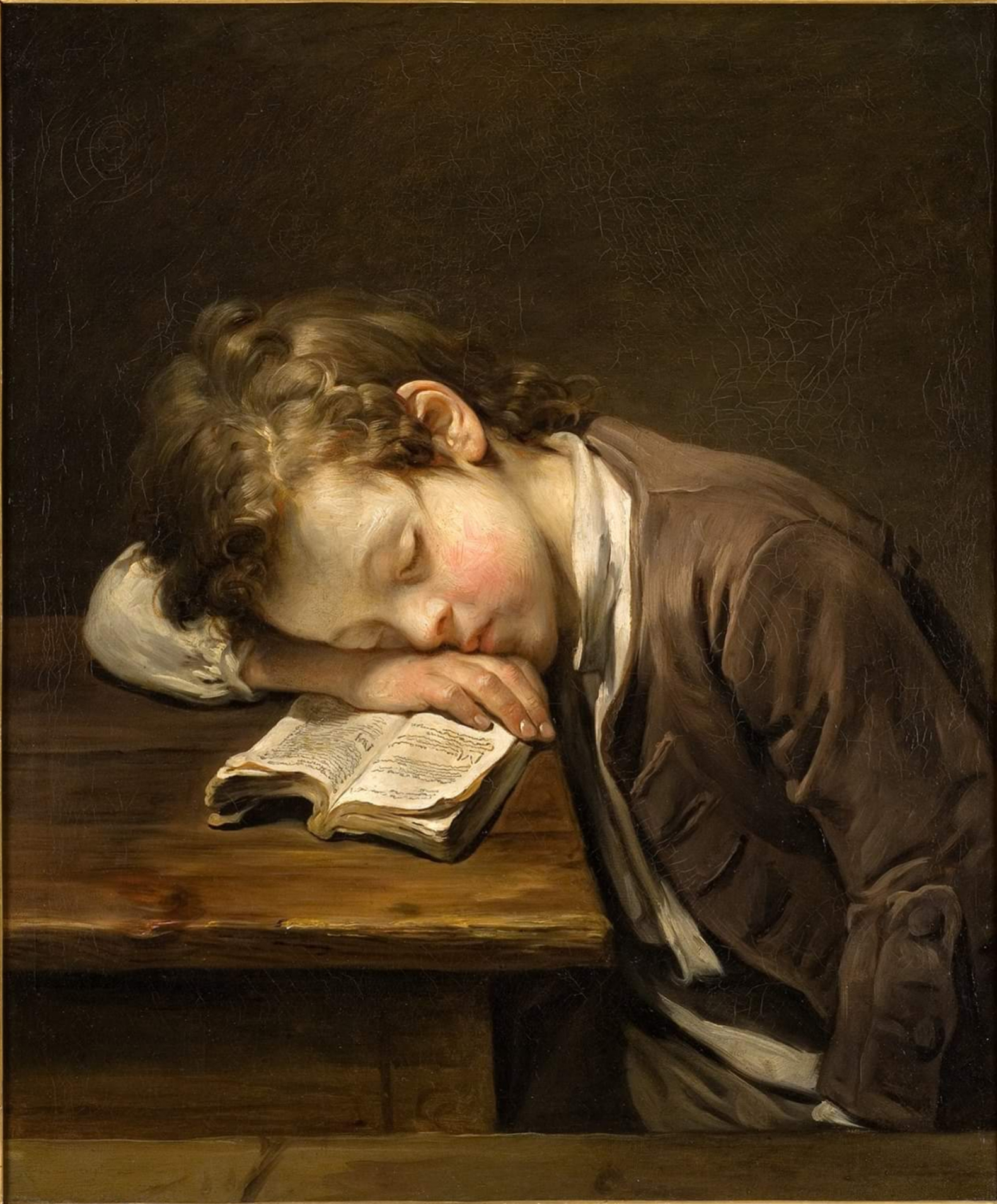
The Lazy Boy by Jean-Baptiste Greuze

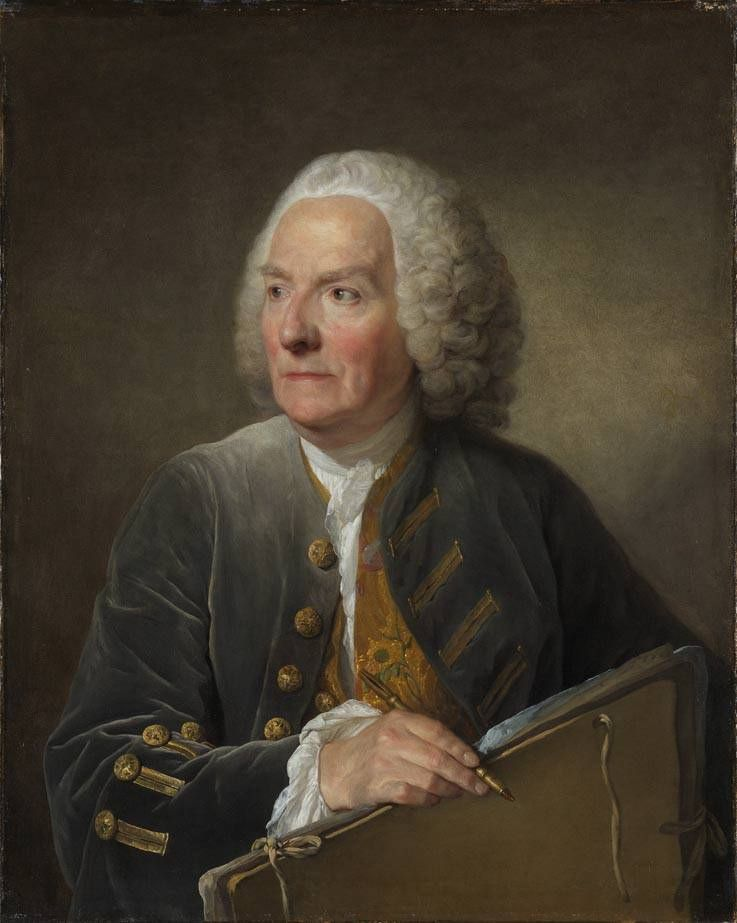
Portrait of Louis de Silvestre by Jean-Baptiste Greuze

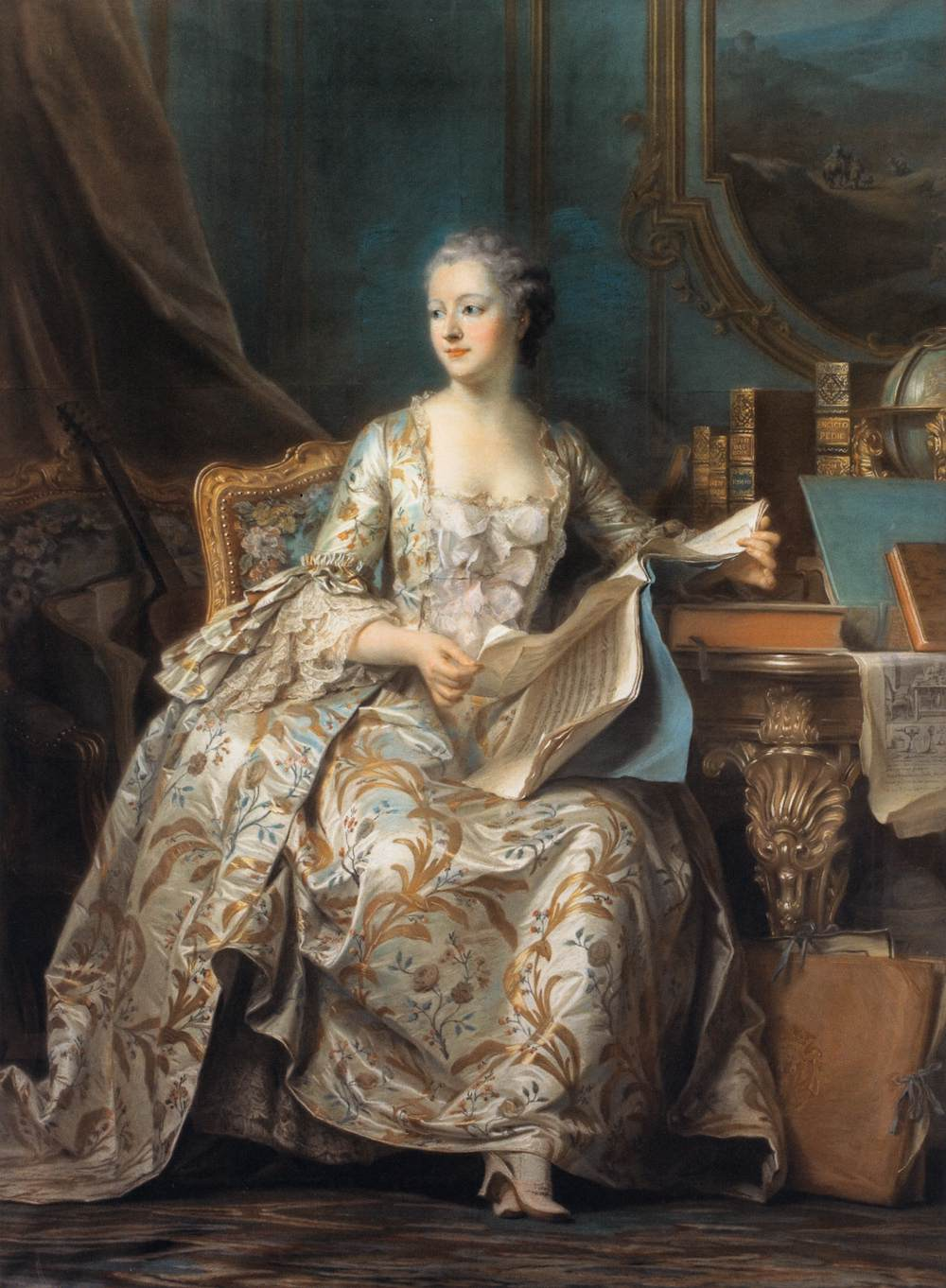
Portrait of Madame de Pompadour by Maurice Quentin de La Tour

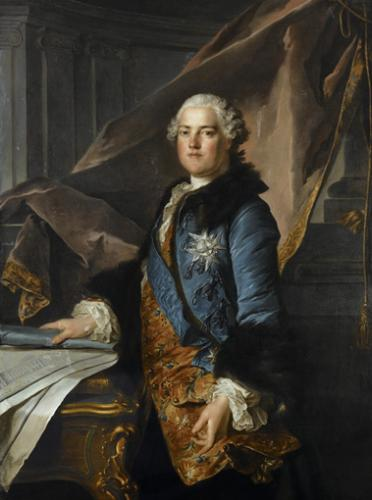
Portrait of the Marquis de Marigny by Louis Tocqué

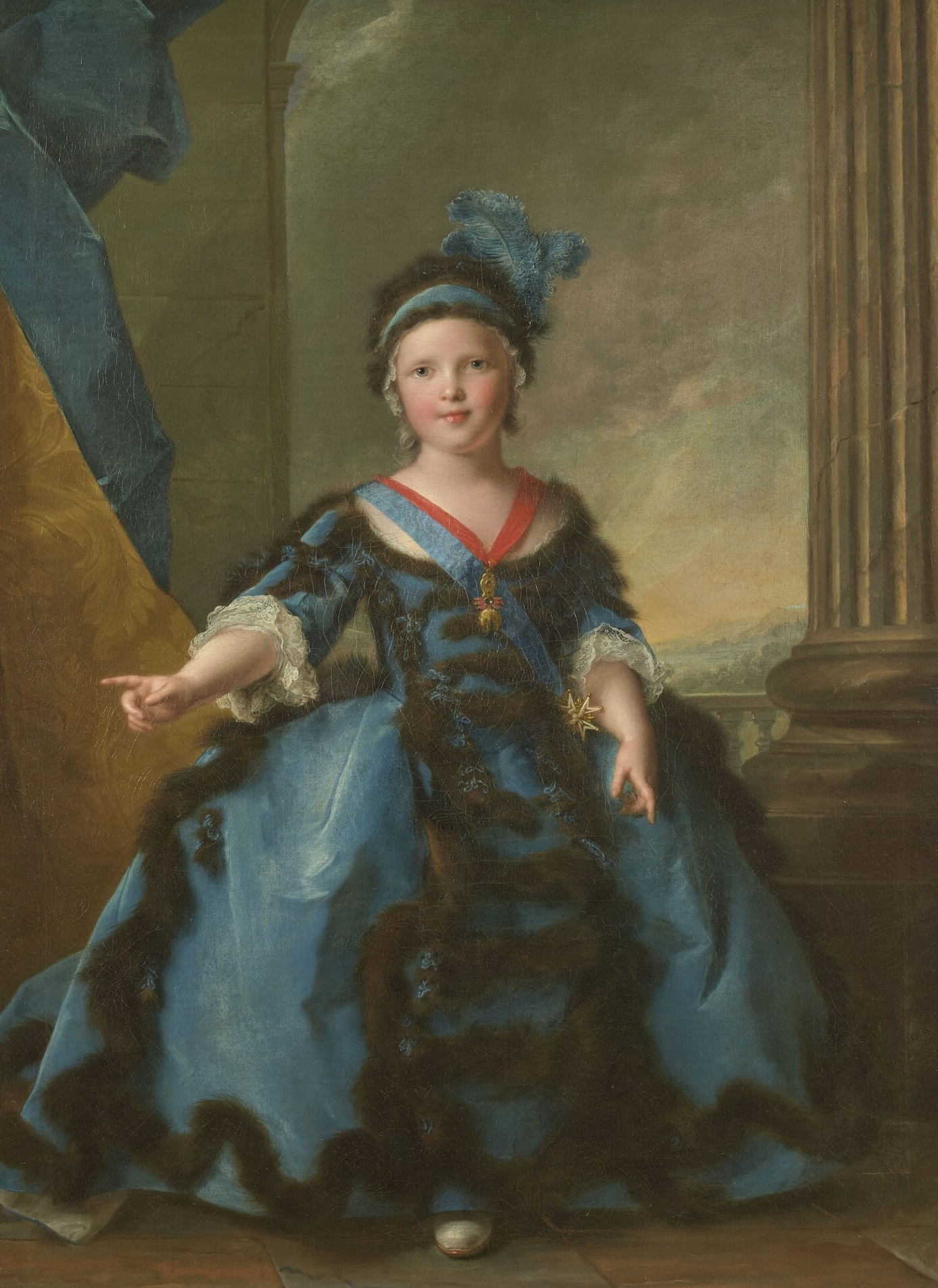
Portrait of the Duke of Burgundy by Jean-Marc Nattier

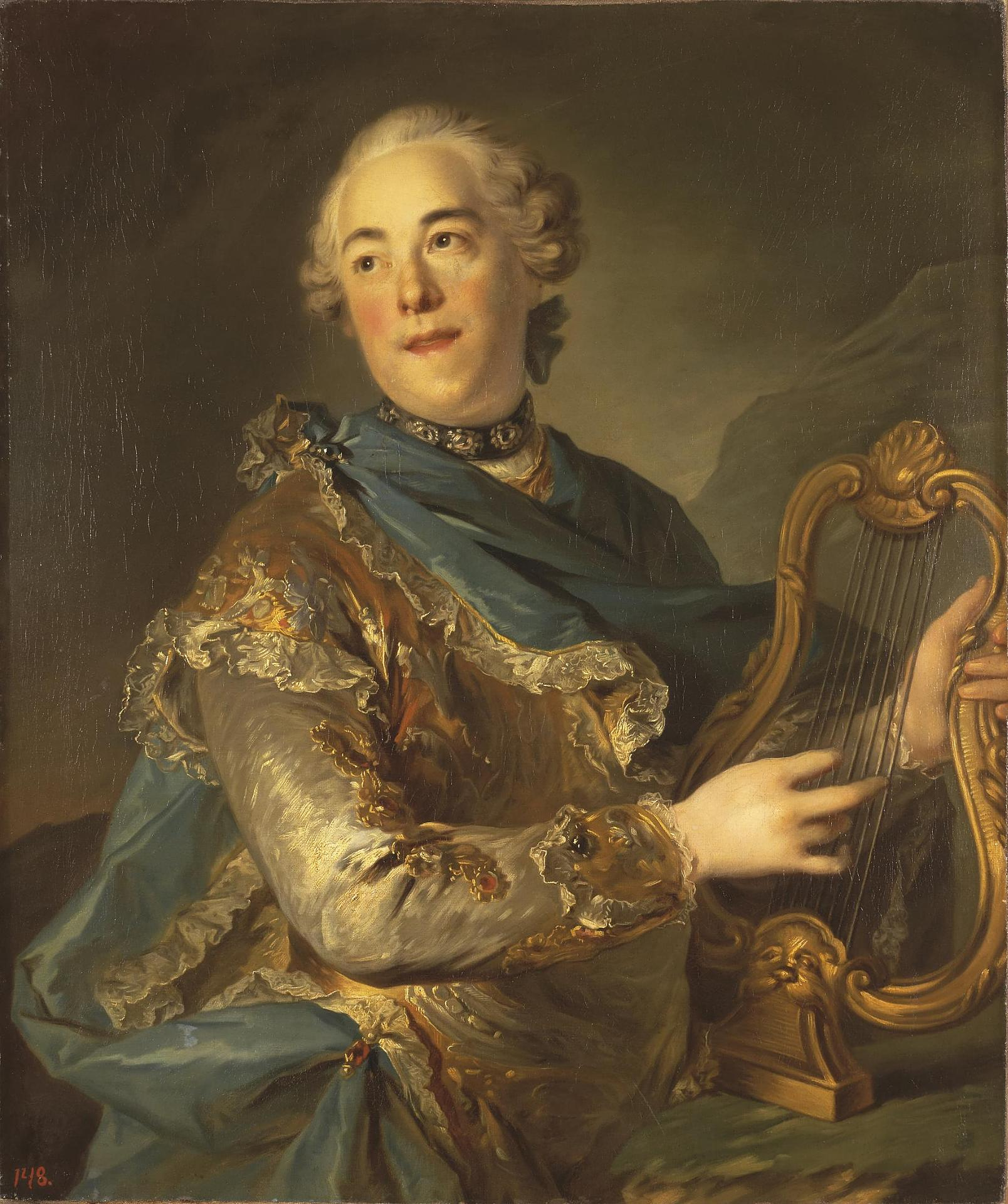
Portrait of Pierre Jélyotte as Apollo by Louis Tocqué

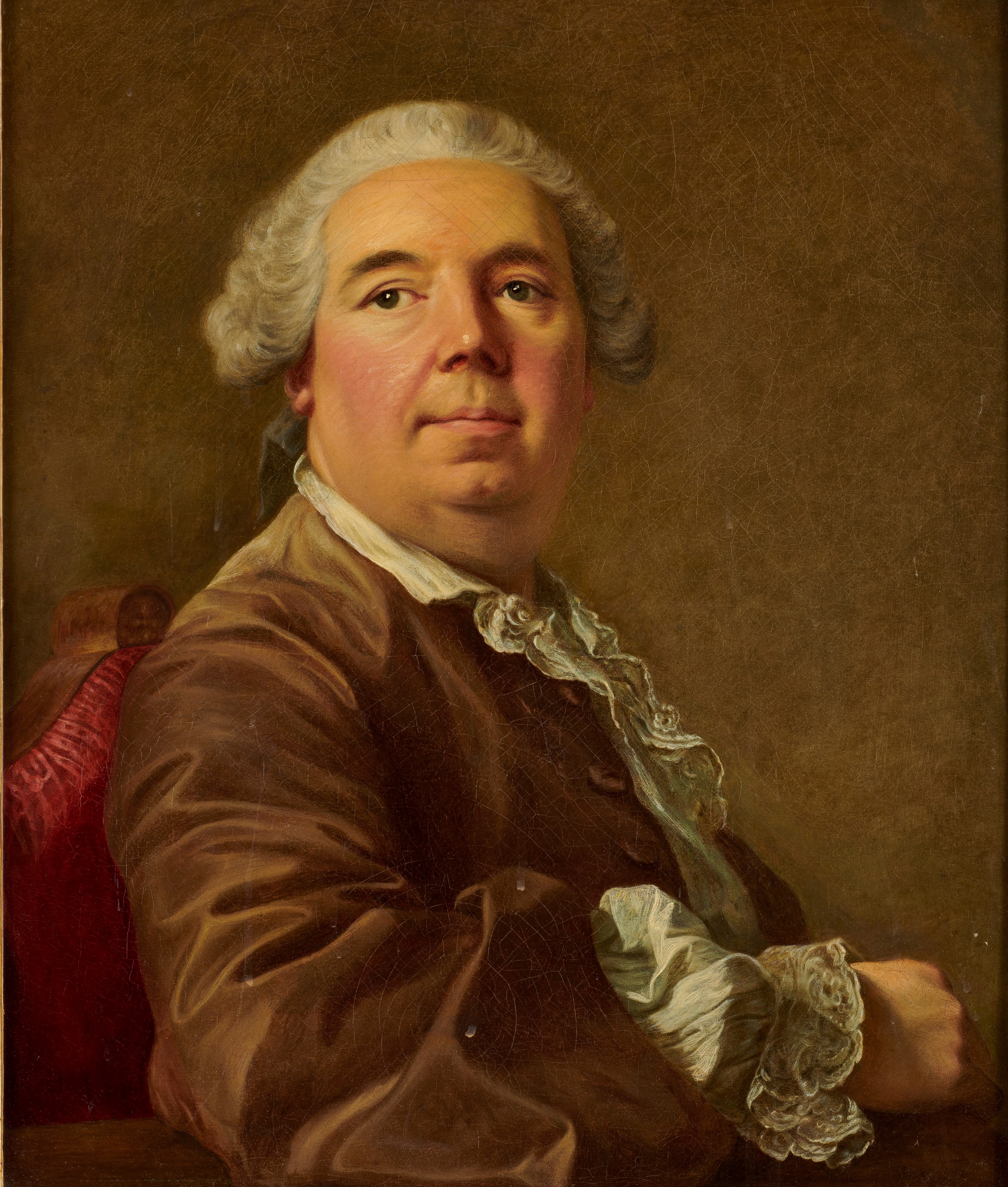
Portrait of François-Louis Colins by Louis-Michel van Loo

== See also ==
- Salon of 1757, the subsequent Salon held at the Louvre

== Bibliography ==
- Baetjer, Katharine. French Paintings in The Metropolitan Museum of Art from the Early Eighteenth Century through the Revolution. Metropolitan Museum of Art, 2019.
- Hooper-Hamersley, Rosamond . The Hunt after Jeanne-Antoinette de Pompadour: Patronage, Politics, Art, and the French Enlightenment. Rowman & Littlefield, 2011.
