= The Bible Reading =

Painting by Jean-Baptiste Greuze

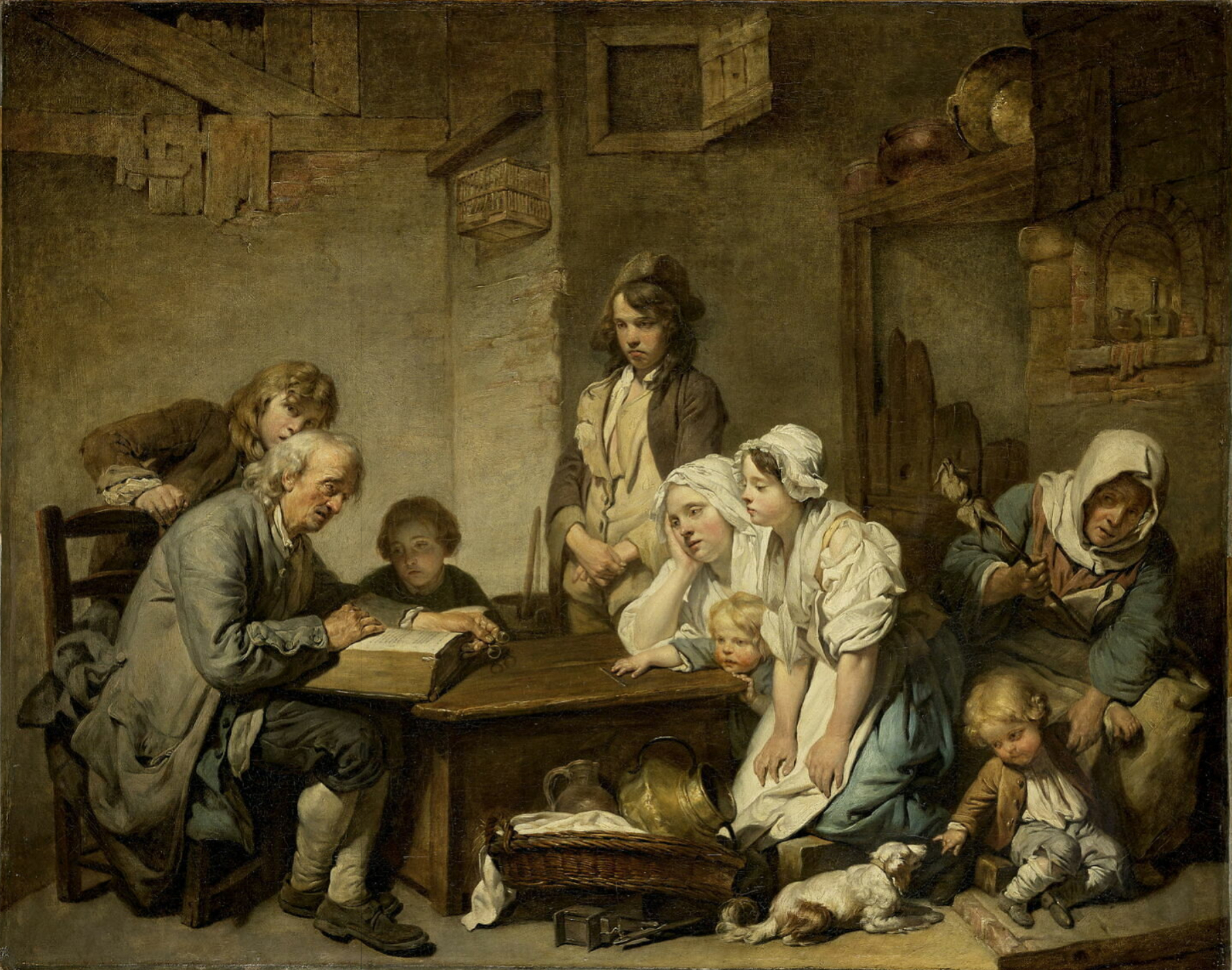
- Artist: Jean-Baptiste Greuze
- Year: 1755
- Medium: Oil on canvas
- Dimensions: 65.3 cm × 82.4 cm (25.7 in × 32.4 in)
- Location: Louvre; Paris

The Bible Reading, Reading the Bible or The Father of a Family Reading the Bible to his Children is an oil on canvas genre painting by French artist Jean-Baptiste Greuze, from 1755.

It was exhibited at the Académie royale on 28 June 1755 then at the Paris Salon of 1755 on 25 August the same year. It was declared a national treasure of France in 2012 and has been in the Louvre since 2016.
