= A Storm with a Shipwreck =

Painting by Claude-Joseph Vernet

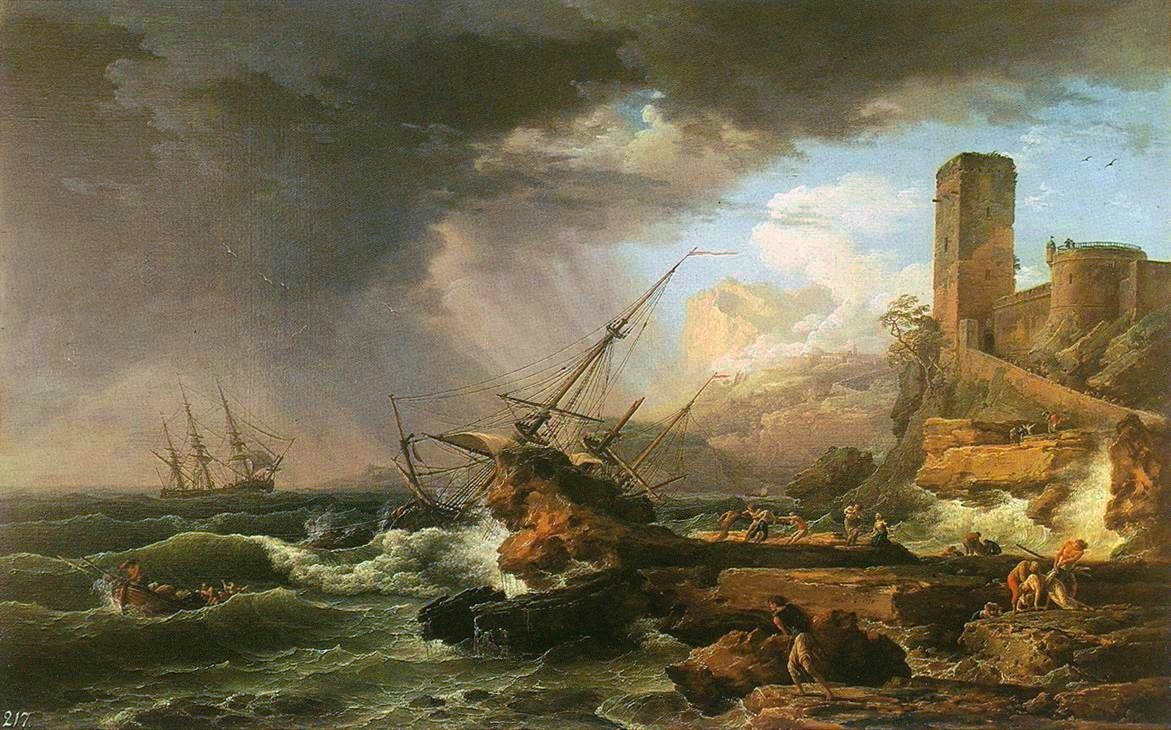
- Artist: Claude-Joseph Vernet
- Year: 1754
- Type: Oil on canvas, landscape painting
- Dimensions: 87 cm × 137 cm (34 in × 54 in)
- Location: Wallace Collection; London

A Storm with a Shipwreck is a 1754 oil painting by the French artist Claude-Joseph Vernet. A seascape, it featured a proto-Romantic scene of a shipwreck amidst a fierce storm on a rugged coastline. The painting was produced by Verner while he was in Marseille. It was commissioned by Madame de Pompadour’s brother the Marquis de Marigny.

The painting was exhibited at the Salon of 1755 at the Louvre, in Paris. Today it is in the Wallace Collection, in London, having been acquired by Marquess of Hertford, in 1869. A replica produced by Vernet's studio is in the collection of Stourhead, in Wiltshire.

== Bibliography ==
- Bailey, Colin C. Patriotic Taste: Collecting Modern Art in Pre-revolutionary Paris. Yale University Press, 2002.
- Cordingly, David. Painters of the Sea: A Survey of Dutch and English Marine Paintings from British Collections. Lund Humphries, 1979.
- Ingamells, John. The Wallace Collection: French before 1815. Wallace Collection, 1985.
