= Interior of the Port of Marseille =

Painting by Claude-Joseph Vernet

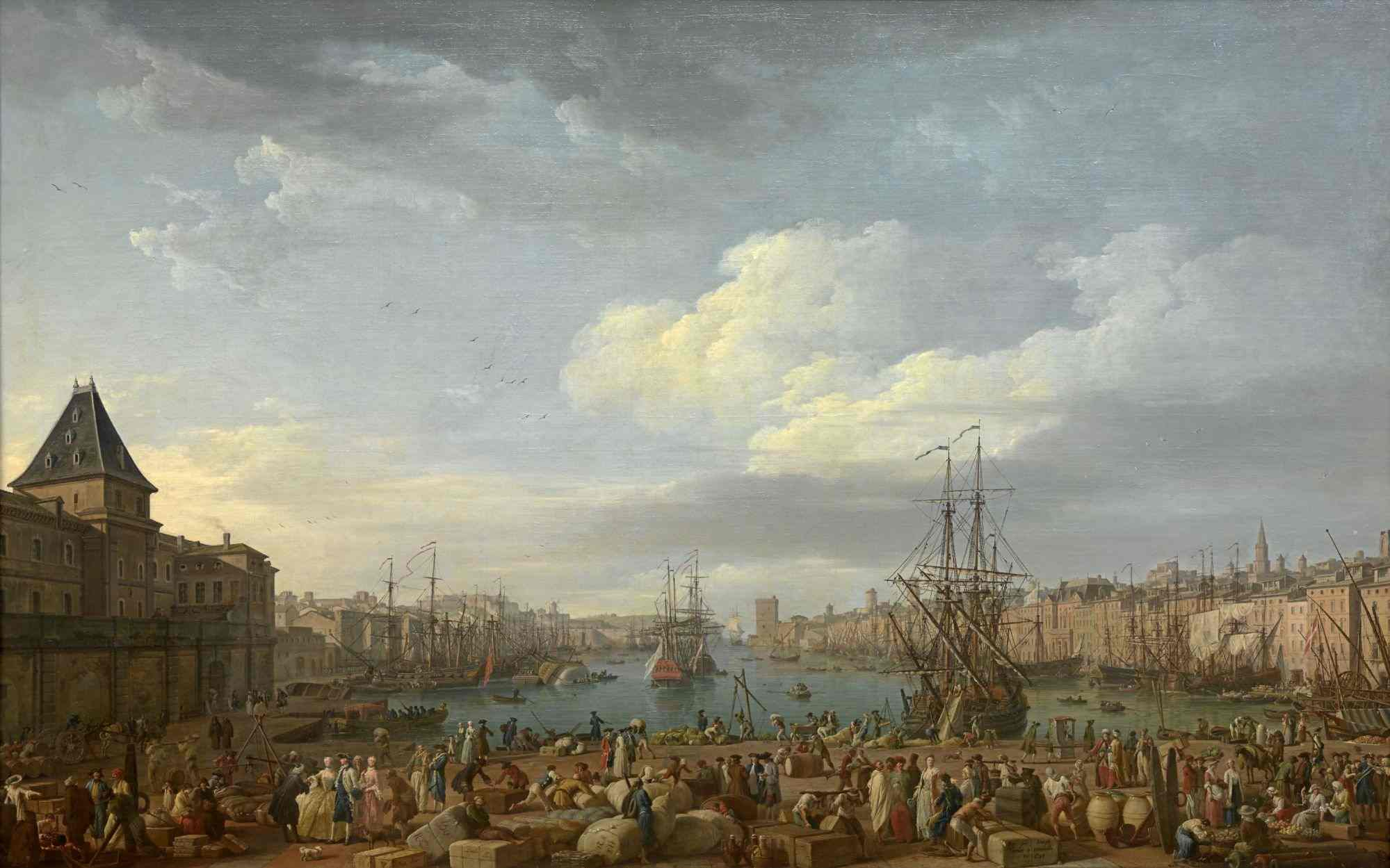
- Artist: Claude-Joseph Vernet
- Year: 1754
- Type: Oil on canvas, landscape painting
- Dimensions: 165 cm × 263 cm (65 in × 104 in)
- Location: Louvre; Paris

Interior of the Port of Marseille (French: L'Intérieur du port de Marseille) is an oil on canvas landscape painting by the French artist Claude-Joseph Vernet, from 1754. It depicts a view of the bustling harbour of the Old Port of Marseille. It is in the collection of the Louvre, although on display at the Musée national de la Marine, also in Paris.

== History ==
The painting was part of his celebrated Views of the Ports of France series. The series was commissioned by Louis XV at the suggestion of the influential Marquis de Marigny. It was one of four of the series that Vernet exhibited at the Salon of 1755. He also painted a different work, Entrance to the Port of Marseille, which was exhibited at the Salon of 1757.

== Description ==
In the foreground, the quayside is bustling. Vernet meticulously depicts the clothing of the figures, illustrating the diversity of social classes: nobles, clergymen, dockworkers, merchants, and beggars. This diversity reflects the intense activity of the port and its role in the economic and social life of the city.

In the background, the harbor basin is framed by the quays. Two ships are moored in its center. The first, with a vermilion-painted stern and flying the French flag, has a pipe-rigged mast, characteristic of Mediterranean practices. The second, to its right, flies a Dutch flag and its features are typical of Nordic ships, testifying to the economic importance of Marseille and its international trade.

The harbor entrance, at the back of the composition, forms the vanishing point of the perspective and enhances the depth of the scene.

== Bibliography ==
- Fried, Michael. Absorption and Theatricality: Painting and Beholder in the Age of Diderot. University of Chicago Press, 1988.
- Martin, Meredith & Weiss, Gillian . The Sun King at Sea: Maritime Art and Galley Slavery in Louis XIV's France. Getty Publications, 2022.
- Presutti, Kelly . Land Into Landscape: Art, Environment, and the Making of Modern France. Yale University Press, 2024.
