= The Lazy Boy =

Painting by Jean-Baptiste Greuze

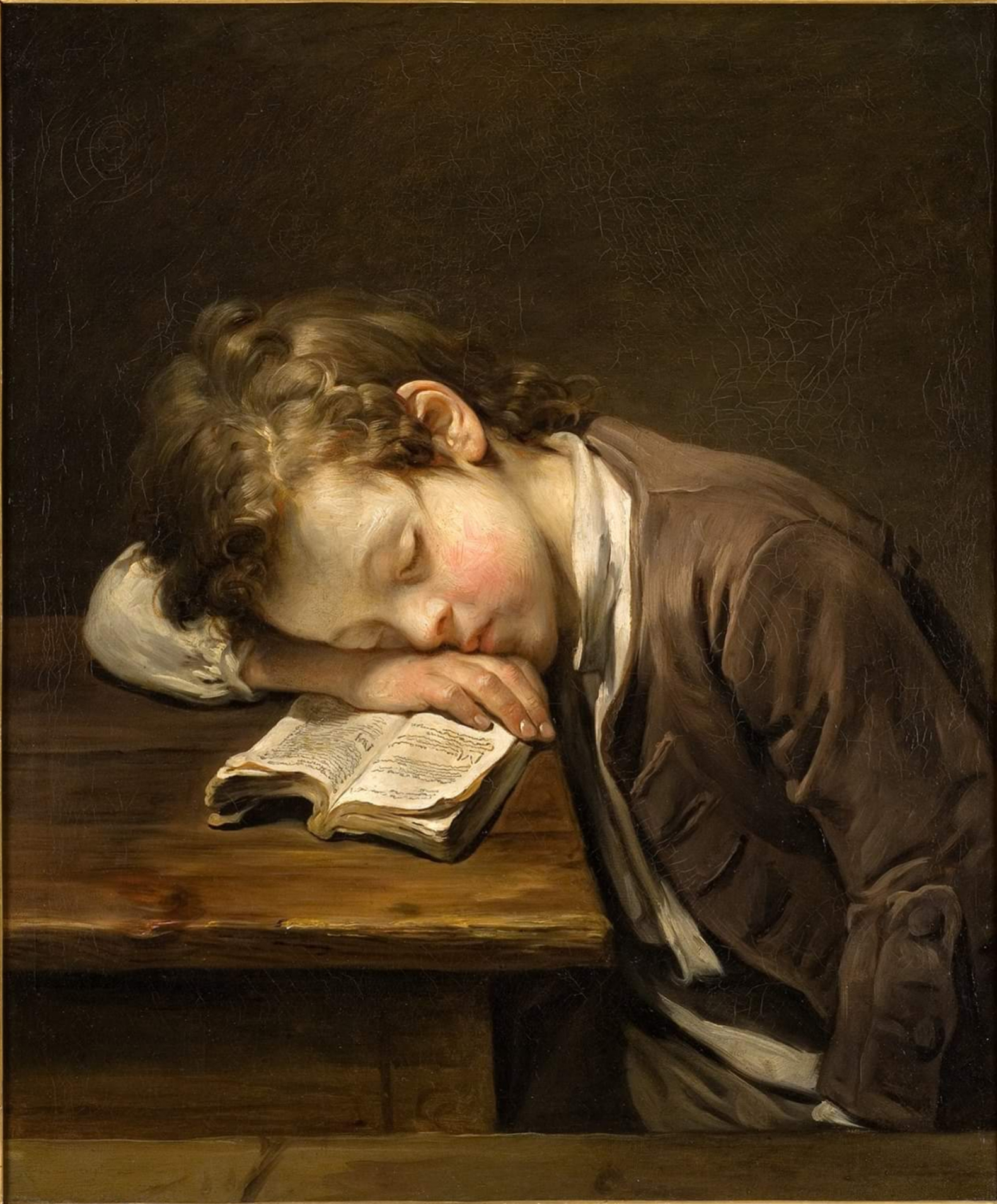
- Artist: Jean-Baptiste Greuze
- Year: 1755
- Type: Oil on canvas
- Dimensions: 65 cm × 54.5 cm (26 in × 21.5 in)
- Location: Musée Fabre, Montpellier

The Lazy Boy (French - Le Petit Paresseux) is a 1755 oil on canvas painted by the French artist Jean-Baptiste Greuze. The painting is now in the Musée Fabre, in Montpellier, to which it was left in 1837 by François-Xavier Fabre. First exhibited at the Salon of 1755 at the Louvre in Paris, it depicts a child that felt asleep while reading a book.
