= Views of the Ports of France =

Painting series by Claude-Joseph Vernet

The Views of the Ports of France (French: Vues des ports de France) are a series of oil paintings on canvas by French painter Claude-Joseph Vernet, made between 1754 and 1765 to answer a requirement by King Louis XV. Representing ten harbours, they were meant to document and promote commerce and naval service.

== History ==
In 1753, Abel-François Poisson de Vandières suggested to King Louis XV that Vernet realise a series of paintings documenting and exalting the harbours of France. The Crown ordered 24 paintings, each paid 6000 Livres tournois, with detailed specifications, such as the foreground representing the activities of the local industry.

Between 1753 and 1765, Vernet traveled to ten of the harbours (Marseille, Bandol, Toulon, Antibes, Sète, Bordeaux, Bayonne, La Rochelle, Rochefort and Dieppe), and eventually completed 15 of the intended 24 views. The paintings were exposed at the Salon de peinture et de sculpture, with long descriptions detailing their technical aspects. From 1758, engraved reproductions of the paintings were made by Charles-Nicolas Cochin and Jacques-Philippe Le Bas and published; they proved popular and were reprinted several times.

The series consolidated Vernet's status as a marine painter, and from then on his paintings were highly priced, "worth their weigh in gold" according to Pierre-Jean Mariette, with patrons such as Catherine II of Russia.

== Legacy ==
In 1791, Jean-François Hue, himself a student of Vernet's, was tasked to complete the series. Between 1792 and 1798, he completed six paintings representing harbours of Bretagne, known as the Vues des ports de Bretagne. In 1793, the Ports de France were amongst the first works exposed at the "Central Museum of Arts", which would become the Louvre Museum.

In 1943, the State Secretary of the Navy requested that the paintings be attached to the Musée national de la Marine; thirteen of the paintings ended up transferring, while the last two remained at the Louvre. The paintings were all shown together in 1976.

== Paintings ==
All of the paintings are oil on canvas, with the same dimensions of 165 by 263 cm.

City	Title	Year	Dimensions (H×L, cm)	Collection	Illustration
Marseille	L'Entrée du port de Marseille	1754	165×265	Musée du Louvre	
Marseille	Intérieur du port de Marseille, vu du pavillon de l'Horloge du Parc	1754	165×263	Musée national de la Marine	
Bandol	Vue du golfe de Bandol : la Madrague ou la pêche au thon	1754	165×263	Musée national de la Marine	
Toulon	Première vue de Toulon, vue du Port-Neuf, prise de l'angle du parc d'artillerie	1754	165×263	Musée national de la Marine	
Toulon	Deuxième vue de Toulon : vue de la ville et de la rade	1755	165×263	Musée du Louvre	
Toulon	Troisième vue de Toulon : la vieille darse, prise du côté des magasins aux vivres	1755	165×263	Musée national de la Marine	
Antibes	Le Port d'Antibes en Provence, vu du côté de la terre	1756	165×263	Musée national de la Marine	
Sète	Vue du Port de Cette	1756-57	165×263	Musée national de la Marine	
Bordeaux	Vue d'une partie de port et de la ville de Bordeaux, prise du côté des Salinières	1758-59	165×263	Musée national de la Marine	
Bordeaux	Deuxième vue de Bordeaux : prise du château Trompette	1759	165×263	Musée national de la Marine	
Bayonne	Première vue de Bayonne prise à mi-côte sur le glacis de la citadelle	1760	165×263	Musée national de la Marine	
Bayonne	Deuxième vue de Bayonne, prise de l'allée des Boufflers, près de la porte de Mousserole	1761	165×263	Musée national de la Marine	
La Rochelle	Vue du port de La Rochelle, prise de la petite Rive	1762	165×263	Musée national de la Marine	
Rochefort	View of Rochefort Harbour from the Magasin des Colonies	1762	165×263	Musée national de la Marine	
Dieppe	Vue du port de Dieppe	1765	165×263	Musée national de la Marine	

== Notes, citations, and references ==
Notes

Citations

References

- Alliot-Duchêne, Virginie; Demarcq, Marie-Pierre; Madet-Vache, Annie; Boëll, Denis-Michel (2012). Joseph Vernet (1714-1789) : Les vues des ports de France. Musée national de la Marine. ISBN 978-2-9525917-0-6.
- Ports de France, Joseph Vernet, musée national de la Marine
