= List of paintings of John Adams =

John Adams was a Founding Father and the second president of the United States from 1797 to 1801. Adams was preceded by George Washington in 1797 and succeeded by Thomas Jefferson in 1801. Adams died on July 4, 1826 at the age of 90, the same day as Jefferson. His last words were "Thomas Jefferson survives", not knowing that Jefferson died hours before him. Adams was painted a significant amount due to painters needing his likeness to record the nation's history; it was also due to cameras not being invented until 1816.

== Paintings ==
=== Portraits ===
Image	Title	Location	Date	Artist	Ref.
	John Adams	Massachusetts Historical Society	1766	Benjamin Blyth	
	Portrait of John Adams	Harvard Art Museums	1783	John Singleton Copley	
	John Adams	Smithsonian American Art Museum	1785	Mather Brown	
	Portrait of John Adams	White House	1793	John Trumbull	
	John Adams	National Gallery of Art	1815	Gilbert Stuart	
	John Adams	National Portrait Gallery	1815	Unknown artist	
	John Adams	National Portrait Gallery	1815	Gilbert Stuart	
	Portrait of John Adams	American Art collection	1816	Samuel Morse	
	John Adams	Smithsonian American Art Museum	1826	Gilbert Stuart	

== See also ==
- Art in the White House
- List of paintings of George Washington
- List of paintings of Thomas Jefferson
- Presidency of John Adams – U.S. presidential administration from 1797 to 1801
