= Portrait of John Adams (Trumbull) =

Painting by John Trumbull

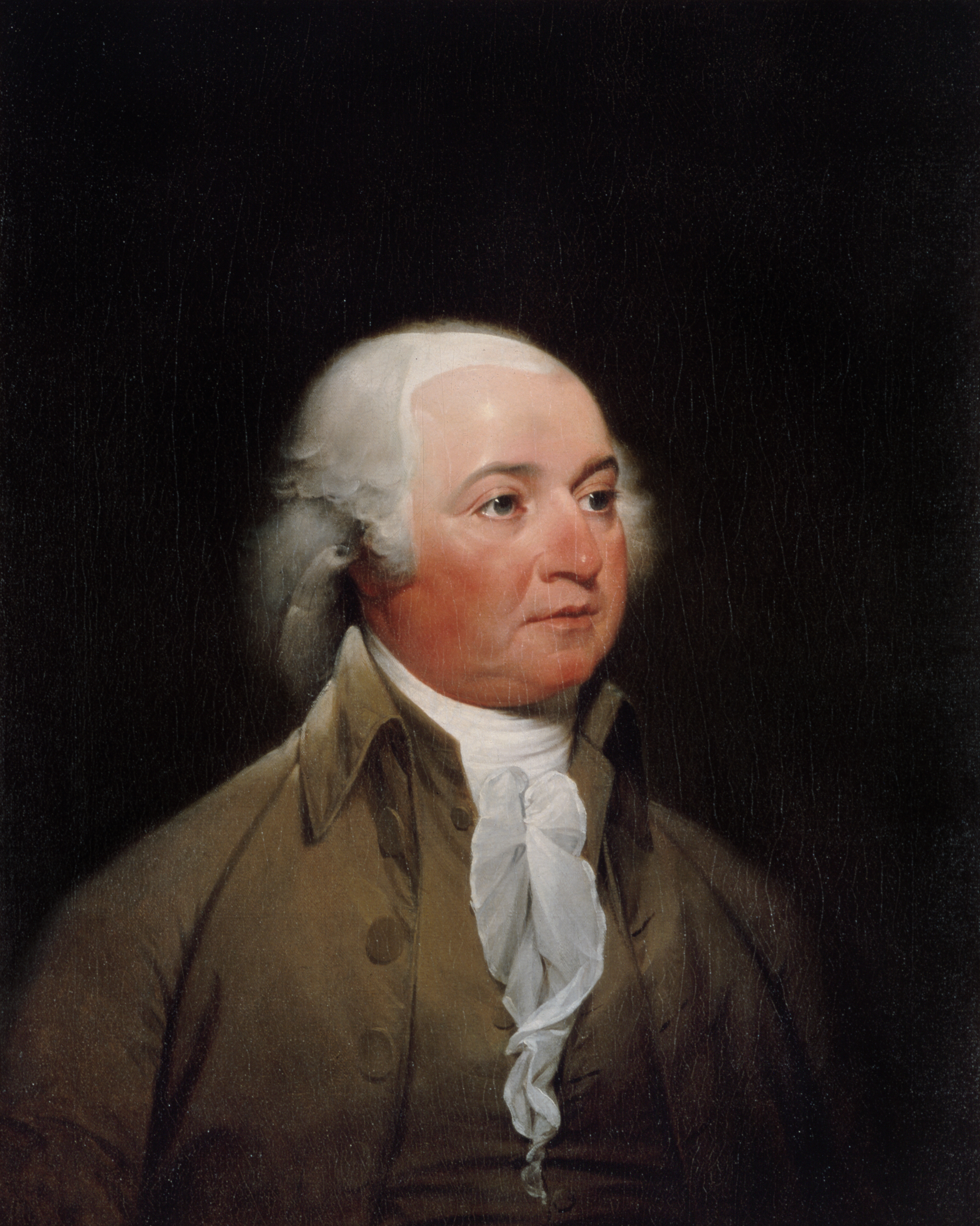
- Artist: John Trumbull
- Year: 1793
- Type: Oil on canvas, portrait painting
- Dimensions: 238.1 cm × 147 cm (93.7 in × 58 in)
- Location: White House; Washington, D.C.

Portrait of John Adams is a 1793 portrait painting by the American artist John Trumbull depicting the lawyer, politician and Founding Father of the United States John Adams. Trumbull was celebrated for his history paintings featuring scenes from the American Revolutionary War.

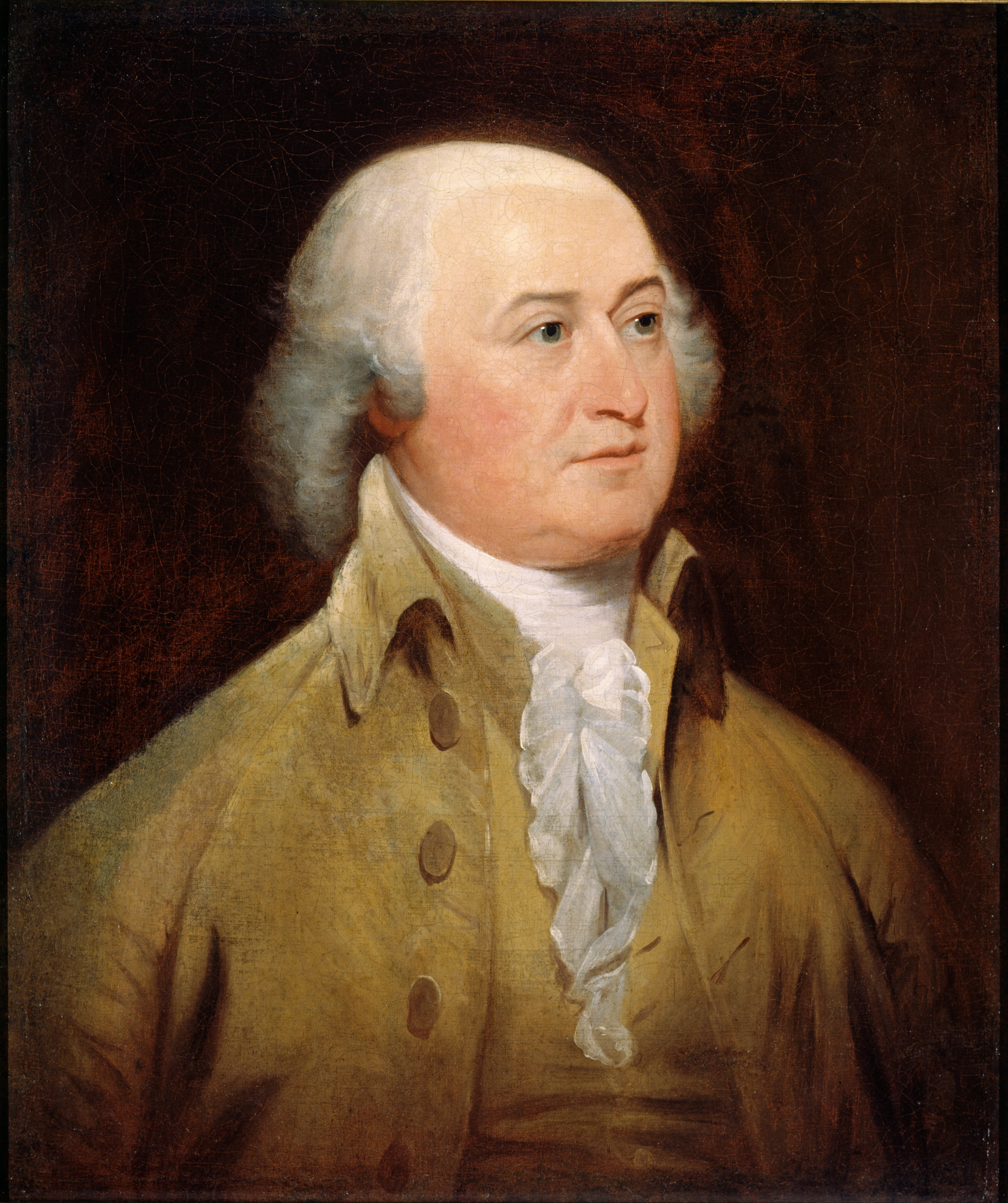
Version in the National Portrait Gallery

Adams sat for him while serving as the first Vice President under George Washington. He is shown wearing the fashionable powdered wig of the era. Versions of the painting are now in National Portrait Gallery (United States) of the Smithsonian, the White House and Harvard University. Trumbull later drew on this likeness of Adams for his incorporation into his large crowd scene for Declaration of Independence.

== See also ==
- Portrait of John Adams, a 1783 painting by John Singleton Copley

== Bibliography ==
- Israel, Jonathan. The Expanding Blaze: How the American Revolution Ignited the World, 1775-1848. Princeton University Press, 2019.
