= List of paintings of Thomas Jefferson =

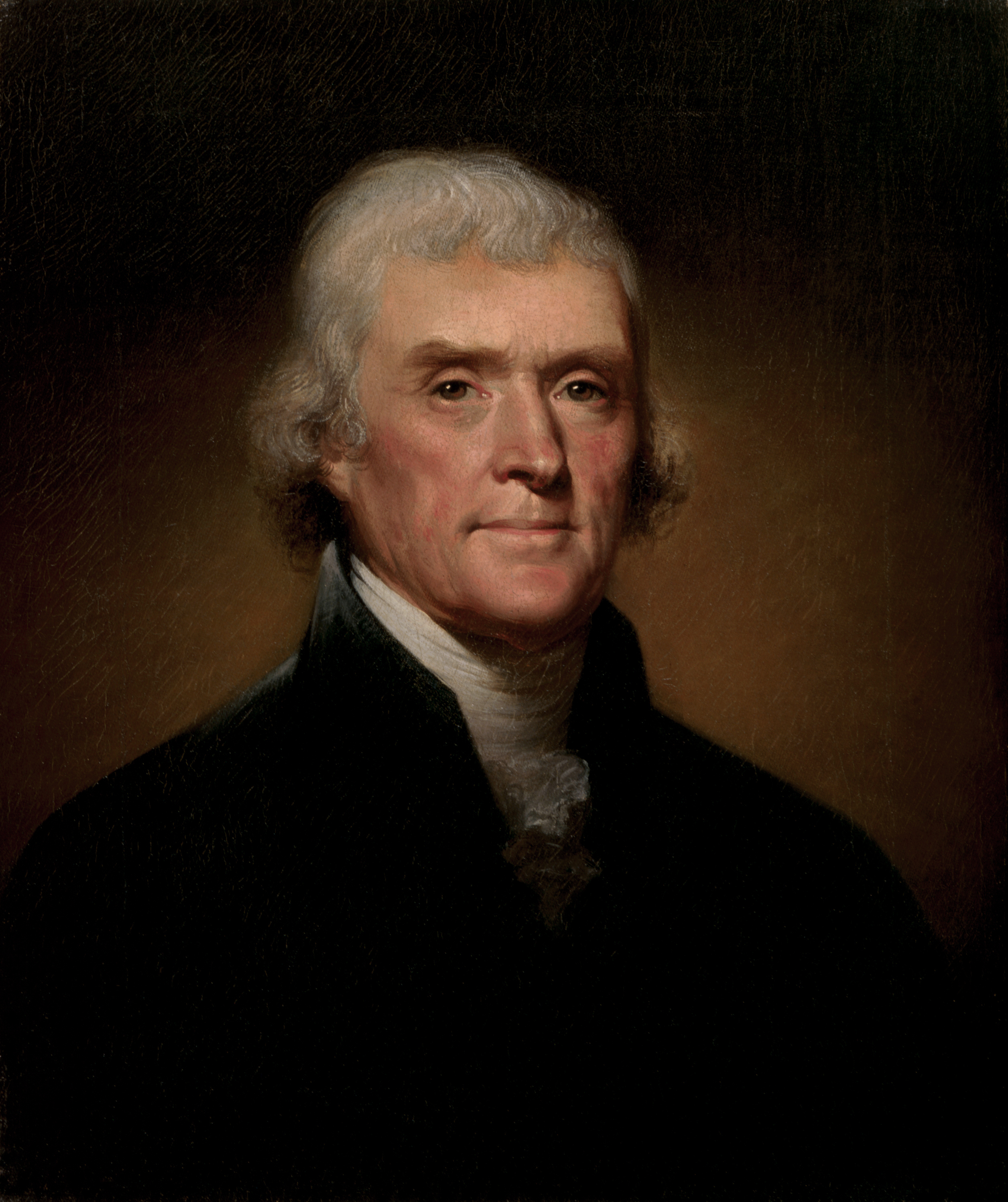
Thomas Jefferson c. 1800

Thomas Jefferson was the third president of the United States from 1801 to 1809 and one of the country's many Founding Fathers. The oil paintings below depict Thomas Jefferson as their central subject, ranging from Mather Brown's Thomas Jefferson (1786) to Jean Leon Gerome Ferris's Writing the Declaration of Independence, 1776 (1921), focusing primarily on original paintings rather than reproductions. Jefferson was frequently painted like many other Founding Fathers, although he only sat personally for paintings twenty-five times.

Artists such as Gilbert Stuart and John Trumbull were well known for their paintings of Jefferson. Trumbull's painting titled Declaration of Independence (1818), which features Jefferson as one of its main subjects, became an American icon due to its appearance on the United States two-dollar bill, frequent appearance in elementary school textbooks, and use on postage stamps.

Artist Mather Brown was also well known for painting Jefferson, such as his 1786 painting of him titled Thomas Jefferson that represents Jefferson's change in fashion; it was also the first oil painting of Jefferson. Stuart's Edgehill portrait (1805) appears on the United States two-dollar bill; according to the Federal Reserve Bank of Chicago, it was chosen because Jefferson is the principal author of the Declaration of Independence. Thomas Jefferson (1821), painted by Thomas Sully, is considered to be the last painting of Thomas Jefferson while he was alive. Paintings of Jefferson have helped shape his public image today, as well as other factors such as architecture.

== Portraits ==
Image	Title	Artist	Date	Location	Ref.
A painting showing a young Thomas Jefferson sitting at a table with his left hand and arm resting on a piece of paper. Behind Jefferson is a wine-red background with a statue off to the far right of the canvas.	Thomas Jefferson	Mather Brown	1786	National Portrait Gallery	
A porthole painting of Thomas Jefferson	Thomas Jefferson	John Trumbull	1788	Metropolitan Museum of Art	
A painting of Thomas Jefferson in front of a white background	Thomas Jefferson	John Trumbull	1788	White House Historical Association	
A painting showing Thomas Jefferson in front of an ocean blue background. Jefferson is looking off to the far left of the canvas. He is wearing a navy blazer with a yellow shirt under it.	Portrait of Thomas Jefferson	Charles Willson Peale	1791	Diplomatic Reception Rooms, U.S. Department of State	
A painting showing Thomas Jefferson wearing a black suit and looking towards the right of the canvas. Behind Jefferson is a red curtain.	Thomas Jefferson	Charles Peale Polk	1799	Victor D. Spark 1000 Park Avenue New York New York 10028	
A painting showing Thomas Jefferson wearing a black suit. Jefferson is looking directly at the viewer. Behind Jefferson is a brown background that fades into black.	Thomas Jefferson	Rembrandt Peale	1800	White House	
A painting showing Thomas Jefferson with gray hair, wearing a brown coat. Behind Jefferson is a greenish background that fades into black.	Thomas Jefferson	Rembrandt Peale	1805	White House	
A painting of Thomas Jefferson sitting down on a red chair at a red table. Jefferson is looking directly at the viewer. Behind Jefferson is a brown pole as well as a red curtain revealing the outside.	Portrait of Thomas Jefferson	Gilbert Stuart	1807	Unknown	
A painting showing Thomas Jefferson looking directly at the viewer in a black suit.	Edgehill portrait	Gilbert Stuart	1821	National Portrait Gallery	
A painting showing Thomas Jefferson looking directly at the viewer in a black suit. The background is brown with black edges	Thomas Jefferson	Gilbert Stuart	1821	National Portrait Gallery	
A full-length painting of Thomas Jefferson standing beside a pillar, looking off to the left of the canvas.	Thomas Jefferson	Thomas Sully	1821	Diplomatic Reception Rooms, U.S. Department of State	
A painting of Thomas Jefferson in front of a white background. Jefferson is wearing a brown coat.	Thomas Jefferson	Thomas Sully	1821	American Philosophical Society	
A full-length painting of Thomas Jefferson wearing a black suit with his fingers on his left hand resting on a table while his right hand is clutching up against his chest.	Thomas Jefferson	Eliphalet Frazer Andrews	1884	National Portrait Gallery	
A painting showing Benjamin Franklin, John Adams, and Thomas Jefferson writing the Declaration of Independence	Writing the Declaration of Independence, 1776	Jean Leon Gerome Ferris	1921	Virginia Historical Society	

== History paintings ==
Image	Title	Artist	Date	Location	Ref.
A painting showing the Committee of Five proposing their draft of the Declaration of Independence to the Second Continental Congress	Declaration of Independence	John Trumbull	1818	United States Capitol rotunda	

== See also ==
- Art in the White House
- List of paintings of George Washington
- List of paintings of John Adams
- List of statues of Thomas Jefferson
