= Fishermen at Sea =

Painting by J. M. W. Turner

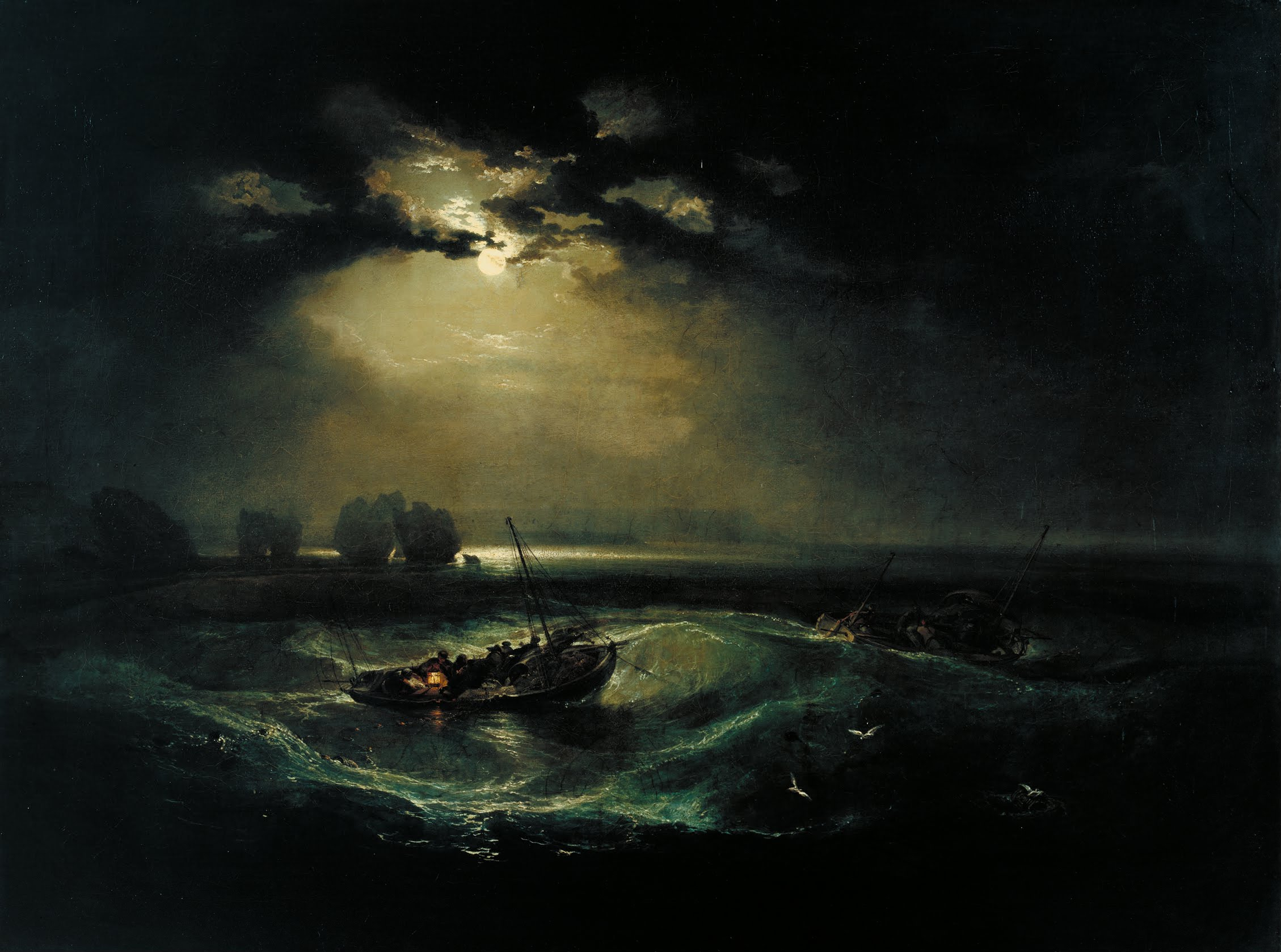
- Artist: J. M. W. Turner
- Year: 1796
- Medium: oil on canvas
- Dimensions: 91.4 cm × 122.2 cm (36.0 in × 48.1 in)
- Location: Tate Britain, London
- Website: www.tate.org.uk/...t01585

Fishermen at Sea is a 1796 oil painting by the English Romantic artist J. M. W. Turner. It depicts a fishing boat in a rough sea under a moonlit sky. It was thought to be the first oil painting that Turner showed at the Royal Academy's annual exhibition until 2025, when a previous painting was rediscovered.

It was well received by art critics at the time and helped Turner's artistic career and early commercial success. Fishermen at Sea has been part of the Turner collection of the Tate Britain museum since 1972.

== History ==
Turner started exhibiting watercolours at the annual Royal Academy exhibitions since 1790, while still a teenager. In the 1796 exhibition, Turner presented Fishermen at Sea. It was considered by art historians his first exhibited oil painting, until the 2025 rediscovery of The Rising Squall, Hot Wells, from St Vincent's Rock, Bristol, which had been exhibited in 1793.

== Description ==
Fisherman at Sea depicts a moonlit view of fishermen on rough seas near the Isle of Wight, and is a work of marine art.

It presents the fragility of human life, represented by the small boat with its flickering lamp, and the sublime power of nature, represented by the dark clouded sky, the wide sea, and the threatening rocks in the background. The cold light of the Moon at night contrasts with the warmer glow of the fishermen's lantern. The chalk formations on the left of the work were traditionally thought to be the Needles on the western tip of the island; however, this has been contested, with some scholars suggesting that the chalk cliffs are instead the ones at the nearby Freshwater Bay.

The work shows strong influence from the work of artists such as Claude Joseph Vernet, Philip James de Loutherbourg, and the intimate nocturnal scenes of Joseph Wright of Derby, especially in its handling of light and shadow.

== Creation and history ==
Recognized as a natural talent, Turner was accepted as a student at the Royal Academy of Arts at the early age of 14. He began as primarily a watercolour painter in the early 1790s. His first public work was Lambeth Palace which he displayed at the Royal Academy Exhibition of 1790. He likely experimented with oil painting privately while in the Academy's schools, but if so, these oil paintings were not publicly shown and were lost. In general, oil paintings were considered more prestigious in the era, and Turner recognized he would have to create them if he was to gain the recognition he desired; Fishermen at Sea would be his first major oil painting. (Note: In 2024, the earlier painting The Rising Squall, Hot Wells was rediscovered and it was found it is an oil painting rather than a watercolour as previously believed.)

Turner had also done maritime scenes in watercolour during the early 1790s, showing an early interest in them. He traveled to the Isle of Wight in 1795 and took a sketchbook with him. The drawings and watercolours made then may have been used as reference material when composing Fishermen at Sea. Turner had just turned 21 years old before the 1796 Royal Academy exhibition in which Fishermen was unveiled to the public.

This painting as well as a watercolour titled Study at Millbank, were sold together for £10 (equivalent to about £1,000 today) at the exhibition. The painting was later acquired by Sir Henry Charles Englefield, and after his death in 1822, it was sold at Christie's on 8 March 1823, under the name View of the Needles, with the effect of Moon and Fire Light. and was bought by Englefield's nephew Francis Cholmeley, remaining in the Cholmeley family for nearly 150 years, displayed at Brandsby Hall for which it became known as the Cholmeley Sea Piece. It was loaned regularly to the Tate Gallery from 1931 and sold to the Tate Gallery in 1972 by Francis William Alfred Fairfax-Cholmeley, with financial support from the Beatrice Lizzie Benson Fund.

== Similar works ==
Due to the Napoleonic Wars and the British Navy during them, marine art was popular in Britain in the decades following Fishermen at Sea and Turner produced a number of similar works of marine art that sold for good prices. Years later, Turner made a similar watercolour study, Moonlight at Sea (c. 1818), for his Liber Studiorum, although the engraved plate was not published. Other Turner pieces that play with the interaction of moonlight and the sea include: Shields, on the River Tyne (1823), Temple of Poseidon at Sunion, Cape Colonna (c. 1834), A Disaster at Sea (c. 1833–35), and Keelmen Heaving in Coals by Moonlight (1835). Turner would revisit marine art with new vigor in the 1830s and onward; in the 1840s, seascapes would account for three-quarters of Turner's overall output.

== Analysis ==
The contemporary journalist Anthony Pasquin (John Williams) gave a recommendation for the piece, writing that the painting "is one of the greatest proofs of an original mind, in the present pictorial display: the boats are buoyant and swim well, and the undulation of the element is admirably deceiving." Art historian Andrew Wilton wrote in 1987 that the painting "is a summary of all that had been said about the sea by the artists of the 18th century."

== See also ==
- List of paintings by J. M. W. Turner
