= Louis XVI Saying Farewell to His Family =

Painting by Mather Brown

- Artist: Mather Brown
- Year: 1793
- Type: Oil on canvas, history painting
- Dimensions: 218.4 cm × 281.9 cm (86.0 in × 111.0 in)
- Location: Wadsworth Atheneum, Hartford

Louis XVI Saying Farewell to His Family is a 1793 history painting by the American-born British artist Mather Brown. It depicts a scene from the French Revolution, with the overthrown Louis XVI saying farewell for the last time to Marie Antionette and his family before he departs for execution. Louis was guillotined on 21 January 1793. His execution and the French invasion of the Low Countries led to war between France and Mather's adopted country Great Britain.

Today the painting is in the collection of the Wadsworth Atheneum in Hartford, Connecticut. In 1823 fellow Anglo-American artist Thomas Cole produced a copy of the painting.

== Bibliography ==
- Evans, Dorinda. Mather Brown, Early American Artist in England. Wesleyan University Press, 1982.
- Kornhauser, Elizabeth Mankin & Barringer, Tim. Thomas Cole's Journey: Atlantic Crossings. Metropolitan Museum of Art, 2018.
- Pressly, William L. The French Revolution as Blasphemy: Johan Zoffany's Paintings of the Massacre at Paris, August 10, 1792. University of
