= Edgehill portrait =

1805 painting by Gilbert Stuart

Edgehill
- The Edgehill Portrait
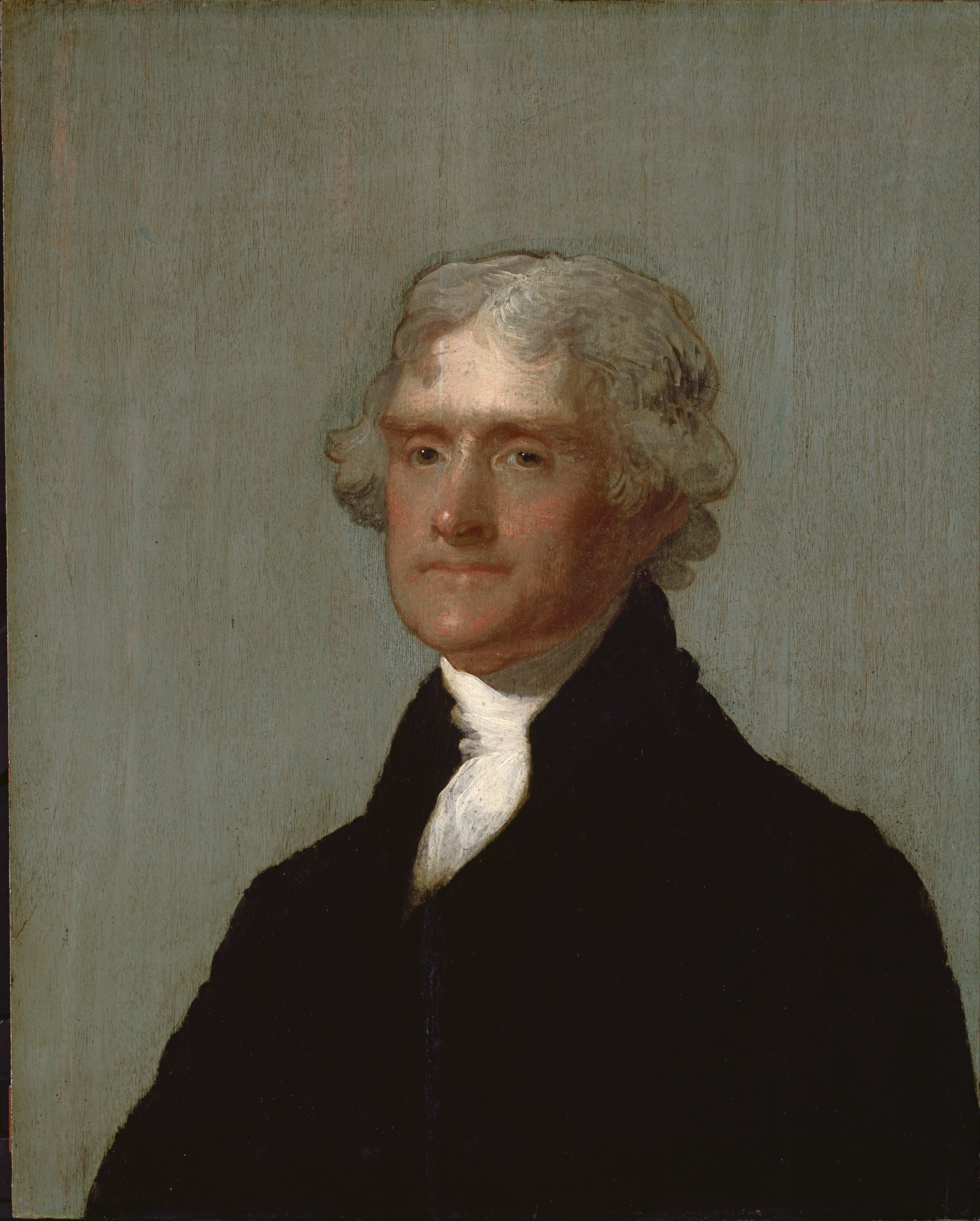
- Artist: Gilbert Stuart
- Year: 1805
- Medium: Oil on mahogany panel
- Subject: Thomas Jefferson
- Dimensions: 66.4 × 53.3 cm
- Location: National Portrait Gallery

The Edgehill portrait, or simply Edgehill, is an 1805 painting by Gilbert Stuart depicting the third president of the United States, Thomas Jefferson, during his presidency. According to Stuart he values the painting at around $100,000.

== History ==
The Edgehill portrait is a life-sized portrait on an oil canvas painted by American painter Gilbert Stuart depicting Thomas Jefferson, a Founding Father and the third president of the United States during his presidency. The painting began around 1805 and was completed by 1821, and though the painting was finished, Stuart held onto it until it was later given to Jefferson.

After the death of Jefferson in 1826, it was passed down to his family, by whom it was later hung up at Edgehill. Then Governor of New Hampshire John Gilbert Winant bought the painting from Francis Burton Harrison sometime in the 1800s or 1900s.

== See also ==
- List of paintings of Thomas Jefferson
