= The Battle of the Nile (Brown) =

Painting by Mather Brown

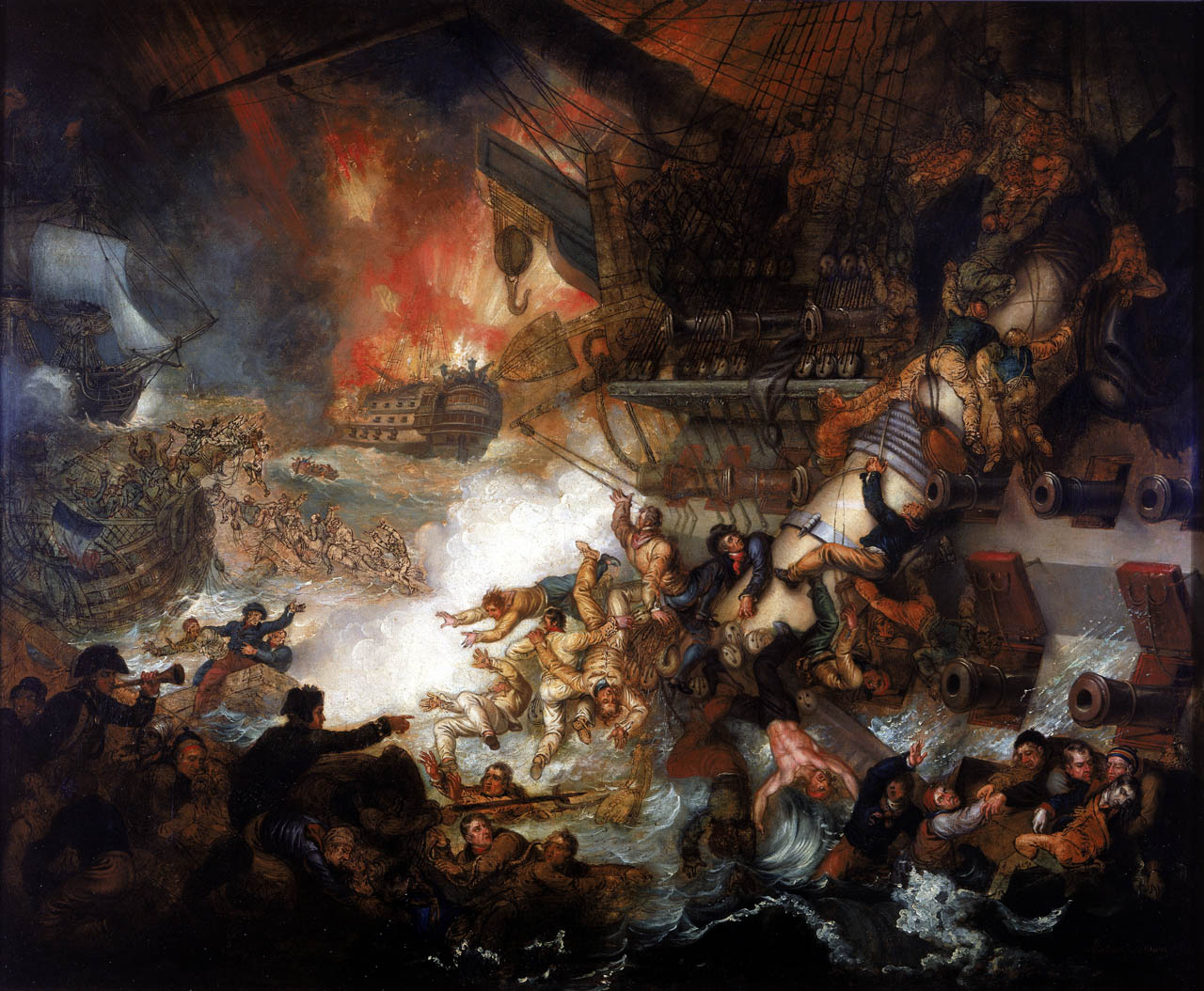
- Artist: Mather Brown
- Year: 1825
- Medium: Oil on canvas
- Dimensions: 103.4 cm × 123.2 cm (40.7 in × 48.5 in)
- Location: National Maritime Museum, London

The Battle of the Nile is a painting of 1825 by the American-British artist Mather Brown.

== History and description ==
It depicts the Battle of the Nile fought in August 1798 which marked a victory for Britain's Royal Navy under Horatio Nelson over the French Republic, thereby stranding Napoleon Bonaparte and his army in Egypt.

Brown exhibited both this and a smaller oil sketch at the British Institution in 1825. This version was intended as a submission for a contest new paintings of battle of scene the new naval hall at Greenwich Hospital. His submission was not one of the four selected to be produced, with an alternative painting by George Arnald ultimately representing Nelson's victory at the Nile. Today Brown's painting is in the collection of the National Maritime Museum in Greenwich.

== Bibliography ==
- Evans, Dorinda. Mather Brown, Early American Artist in England. Wesleyan University Press, 1982
- Tracy, Nicholas. Britannia’s Palette: The Arts of Naval Victory. McGill-Queen's Press, 2007.
- Walker, Richard. The Nelson Portraits: An Iconography of Horatio, Viscount Nelson. Royal Naval Museum Publications, 1998
