= Rufus Hopkins =

American judge (1727–1809)

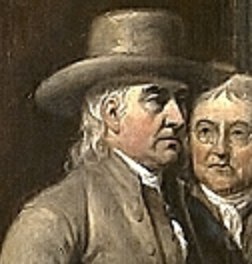
Rufus Hopkins painted as his father Stephen Hopkins, for whom no portrait was available, in John Trumbull's Declaration of Independence (1819).

Rufus Hopkins (February 10, 1727 – August 1809) was a sailor and businessman who served as a Deputy in the Rhode Island General Assembly from 1772 to 1775, and again from 1781 to 1785.

== Career ==
Born in Cranston, Rhode Island, the son of Rhode Island colonial Governor Stephen Hopkins, Rufus Hopkins was a sailor, and "[h]is early life was spent in maritime pursuits, in which he attained high rank as a nautical commander". Around 1766 he associated with a group including his father, Nicholas, Joseph, John and Moses Brown, and Jabez Bowen in a project to utilize a bed of iron ore found in Cranston and the building of Hope Furnace. Hopkins invested 500 pounds in the project, located in Scituate, Rhode Island, and became its superintendent.

While working at the furnace, he was appointed as a judge of the Court of Common Pleas for Providence County, serving in this capacity for several years. He was reportedly appointed for a term as a justice of the superior court of the state, though records are inconsistent on this, with the official manual of the state omitting his name from the record of justices. During this time he was also elected to represent Scituate in the general assembly. During the American Revolutionary War, items cast in the furnace under his supervision included cannon, cast two at a time for use by the American army and navy.

On December 14, 1775, he was one of a committee appointed by Congress to superintend the building of vessels of war. After the war, he was again elected to represent Scituate in the general assembly. In 1782, he became trustee of Brown University, remaining in that position until his death. In 1787, the broken steeple bell of the First Baptist Church was recast at Hope Furnace under his charge. He was concerned in the first cotton factory built near the Hope Furnace in 1807.

== Personal life and death ==
On October 13, 1747, he married Abigail Angell, daughter of John Angell. Abigail died July 21, 1758, at the age of 27. On November 11, 1759, Hopkins married Sarah Olney, daughter of Captain Joseph Olney and sister of Colonel Jeremiah Olney. She was born March 31, 1732, and died October 8, 1785. The children of Rufus and Abigail were John, an unnamed daughter who died the same day she was born, and Silvanus, who lived one year. His children with Sara Hopkins were Stephen, Silvanus, Rufus, who died at the age of 2 and Joseph, who died at the age of 18. The surviving Silvanus, one of his sons became the first agent of the Hope Manufacturing Company.

Hopkins died in Scituate in 1809, at the house of Mr. Andrew Ralph, and was buried in the North Burial Ground, Providence. Hopkins was said to have greatly resembled his father, and the likeness of his father in the picture among the signers of the United States Declaration of Independence in John Trumbull's portrait of the event is actually Rufus Hopkins.
