= Thomas Jefferson (Brown) =

Painting by Mather Brown

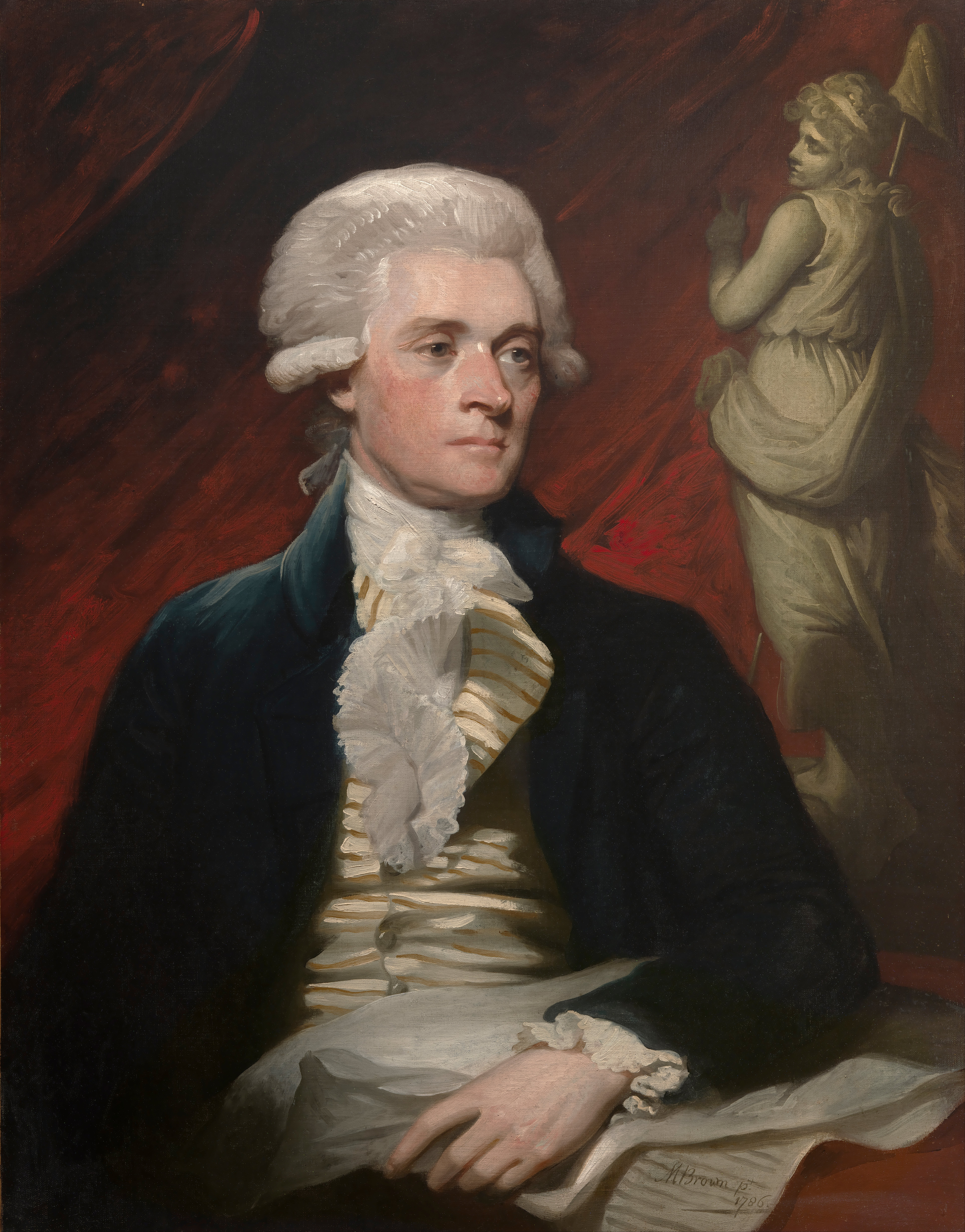
- Artist: Mather Brown
- Year: 1786
- Medium: Oil on canvas, portrait painting
- Subject: Thomas Jefferson
- Dimensions: 91.4 cm × 71.1 cm (36.0 in × 28.0 in)
- Location: National Portrait Gallery, Washington D.C.

Thomas Jefferson is a 1786 portrait painting by the American-born British-based artist Mather Brown. Brown painted the portrait while Thomas Jefferson was in London. Jefferson was currently serving as Ambassador in Paris but visited Britain to meet John Adams who suggested he sit for the picture. Today the painting is in the collection of the National Portrait Gallery in Washington D.C.

The Goddess of Liberty carrying a Phrygian cap is depicted slightly behind Jefferson in the portrait.

== See also ==
- List of paintings of Thomas Jefferson
