= Royal Academy Exhibition of 1796 =

1796 art exhibition in London

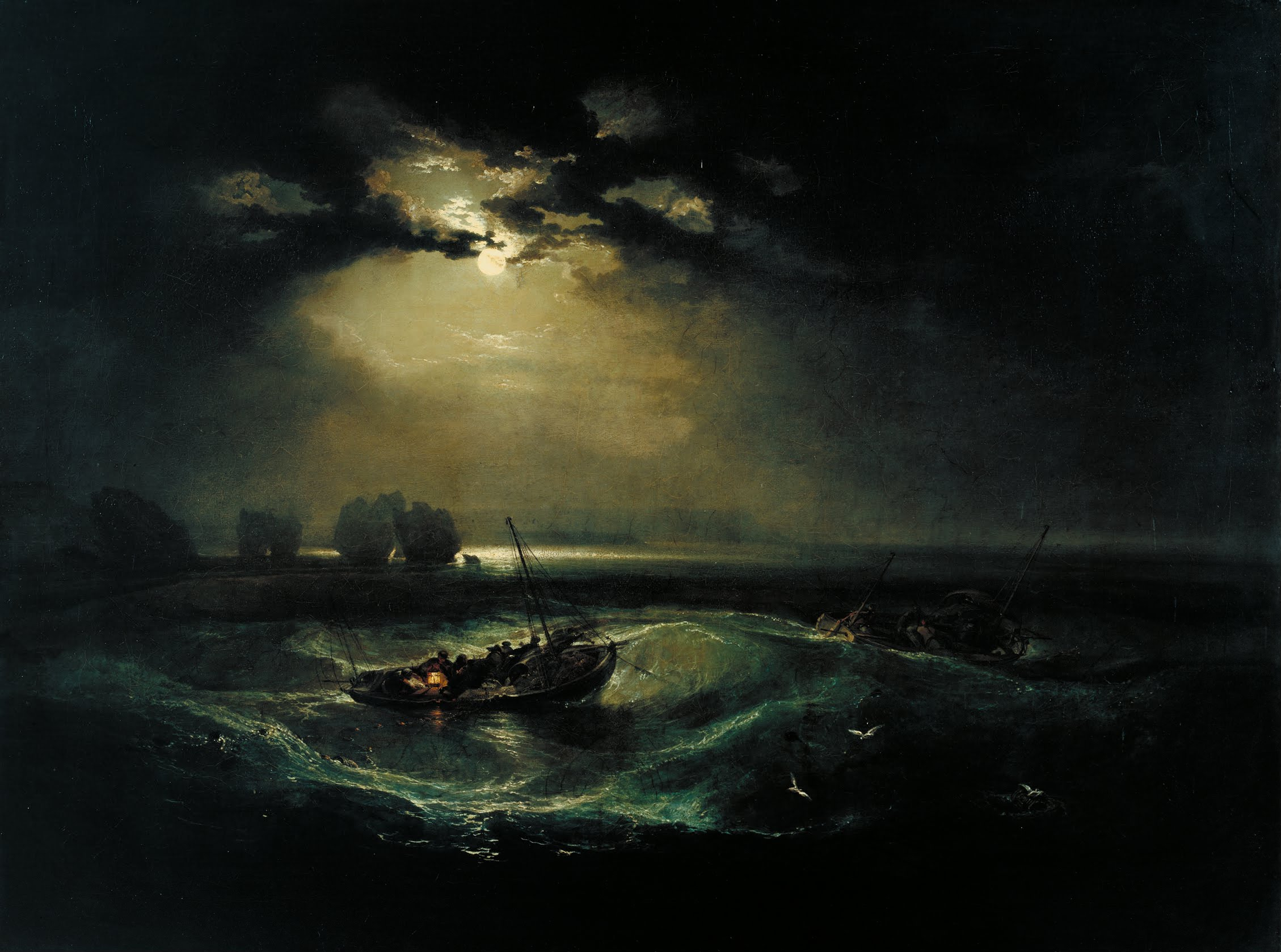
Fishermen at Sea by J.M.W. Turner

The Royal Academy Exhibition of 1796 was an art exhibition held at Somerset House in London between 25 April and 4 June 1796. It was the twenty-eighth annual Summer Exhibition of the Royal Academy of Arts. It drew an unprecedented 1,500 visitors on its opening day.

The exhibition was noted for the dominance of three portrait painters—William Beechey, John Hoppner and Thomas Lawrence—who had filled the gap left by the death of the first President of the Royal Academy and leading portraitist of the later eighteenth century, Joshua Reynolds, four years earlier. The ascendency of the three was commented on by George III when he attended a private viewing. The exhibition took place against the backdrop of the French Revolutionary Wars. The Prince of Orange, in exile following the French annexation of the Netherlands, attended the academy's annual dinner. The exhibition featured works by French emigres such as John James Masquerier and Henri-Pierre Danloux.

J.M.W. Turner, at twenty-one a rising star of British painting, exhibited the seascape Fishermen at Sea with a nighttime setting off the coast of the Isle of Wight. Angelica Kauffman, one of the founding members of the Academy but long resident in Rome, submitted a Neoclassical history painting, Euphrosyne Complaining to Venus of the Wound Caused by Cupid's Dart.

The German artist Johann Zoffany submitted several theatrical paintings as well as The Embassy of Hyderbeck to Calcutta, inspired by his recent visit to India. Alongside several religious paintings, the American-born President Benjamin West showed two genre scenes of harvesters and woodcutters in Windsor Park.

== Gallery ==
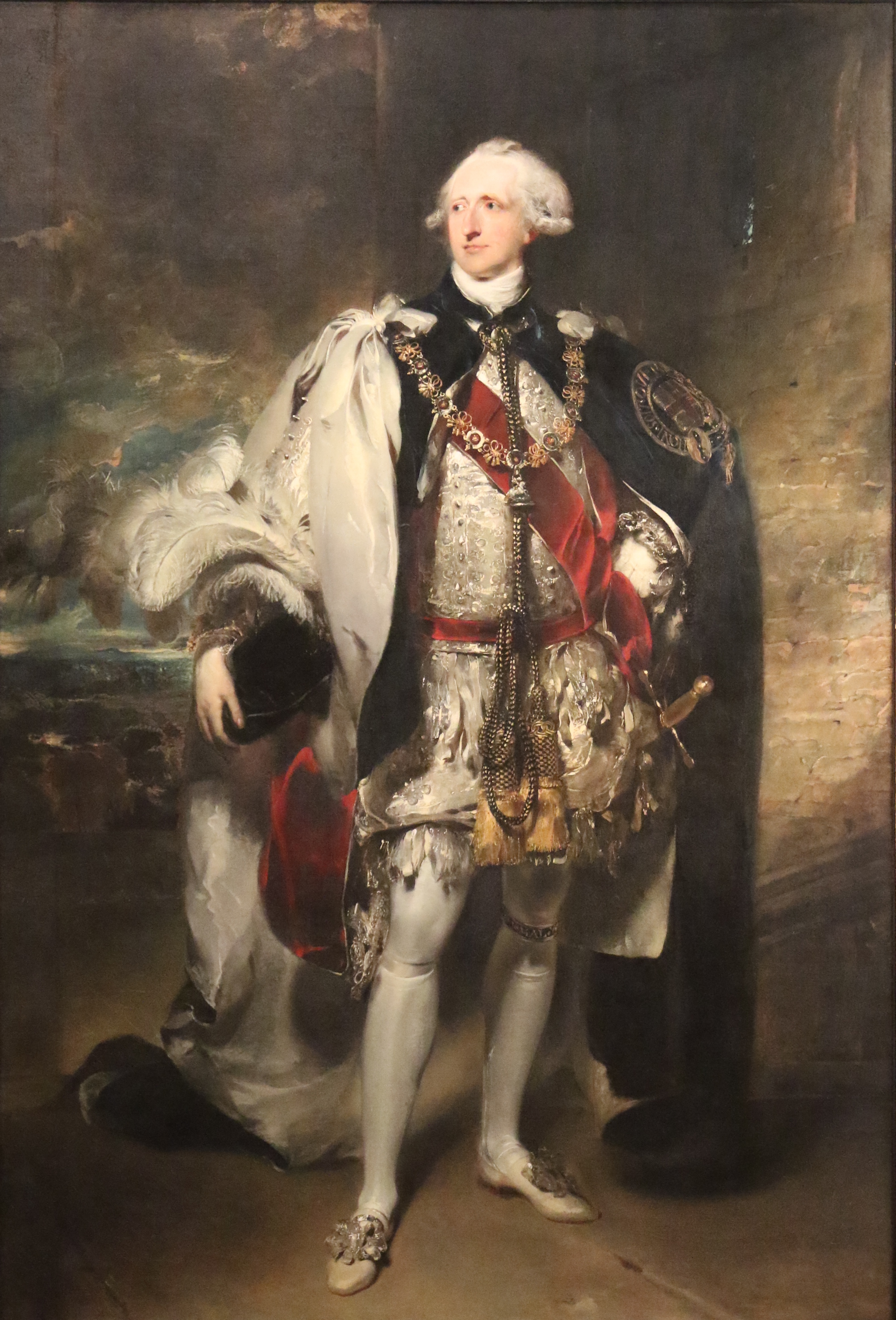
Portrait of the Duke of Leeds by Thomas Lawrence

Portrait of Colonel David Markham by Thomas Lawrence

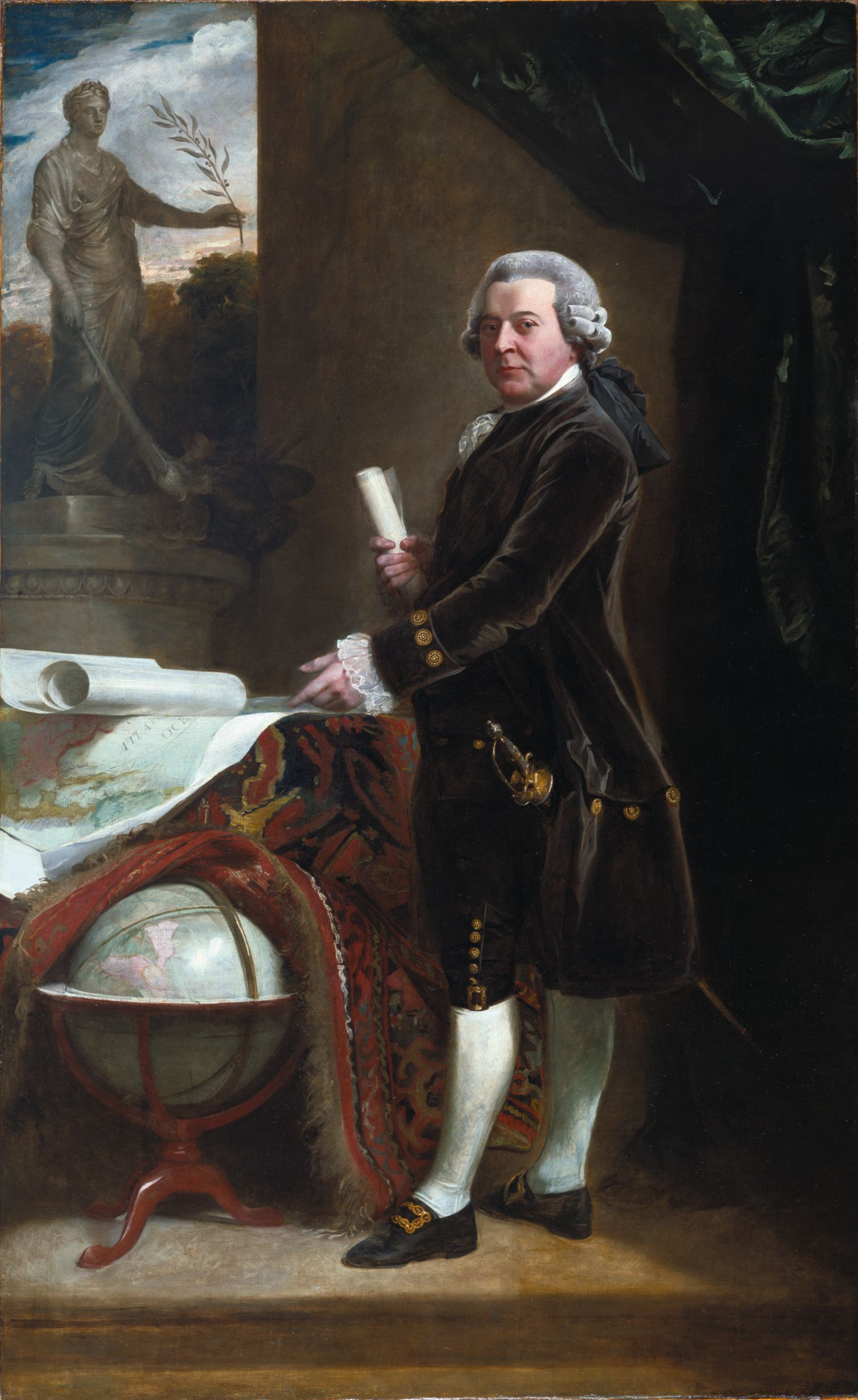
Portrait of John Adams by John Singleton Copley

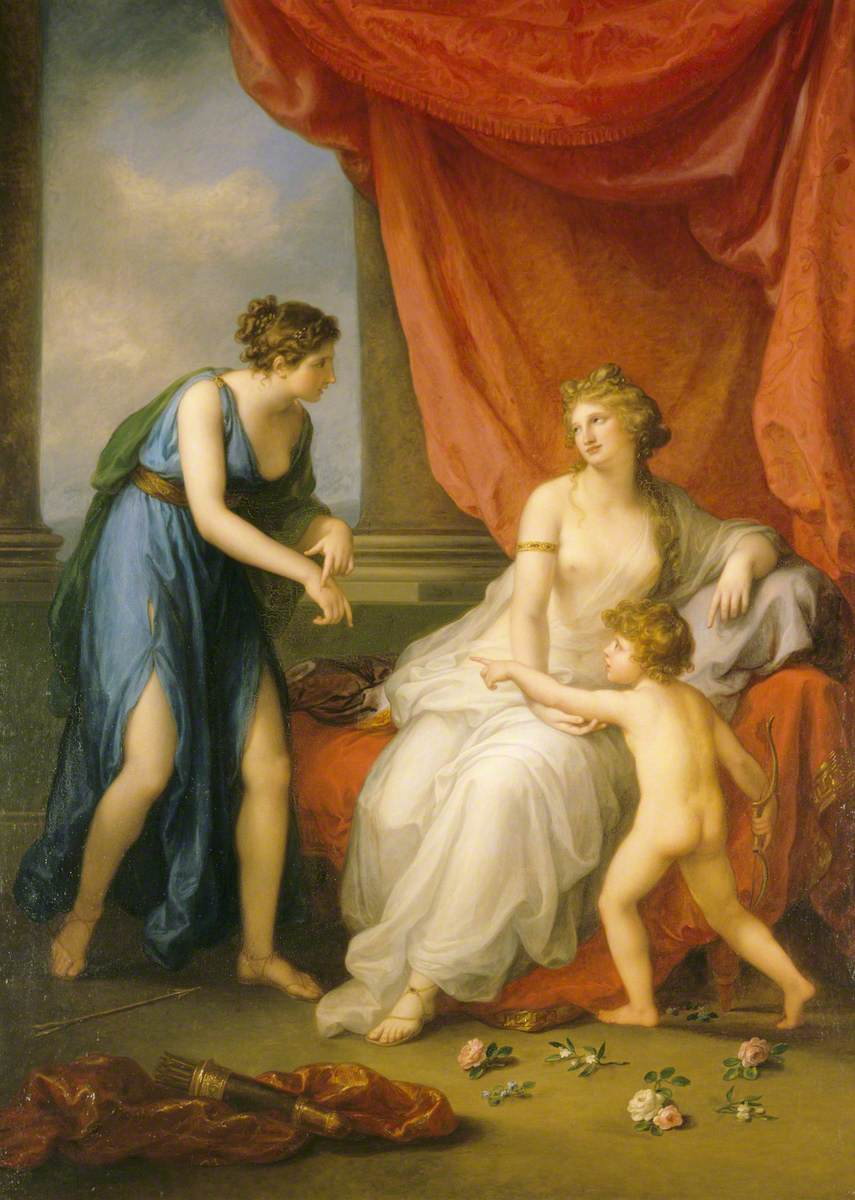
Euphrosyne Complaining to Venus of the Wound Caused by Cupid's Dart by Angelica Kauffman

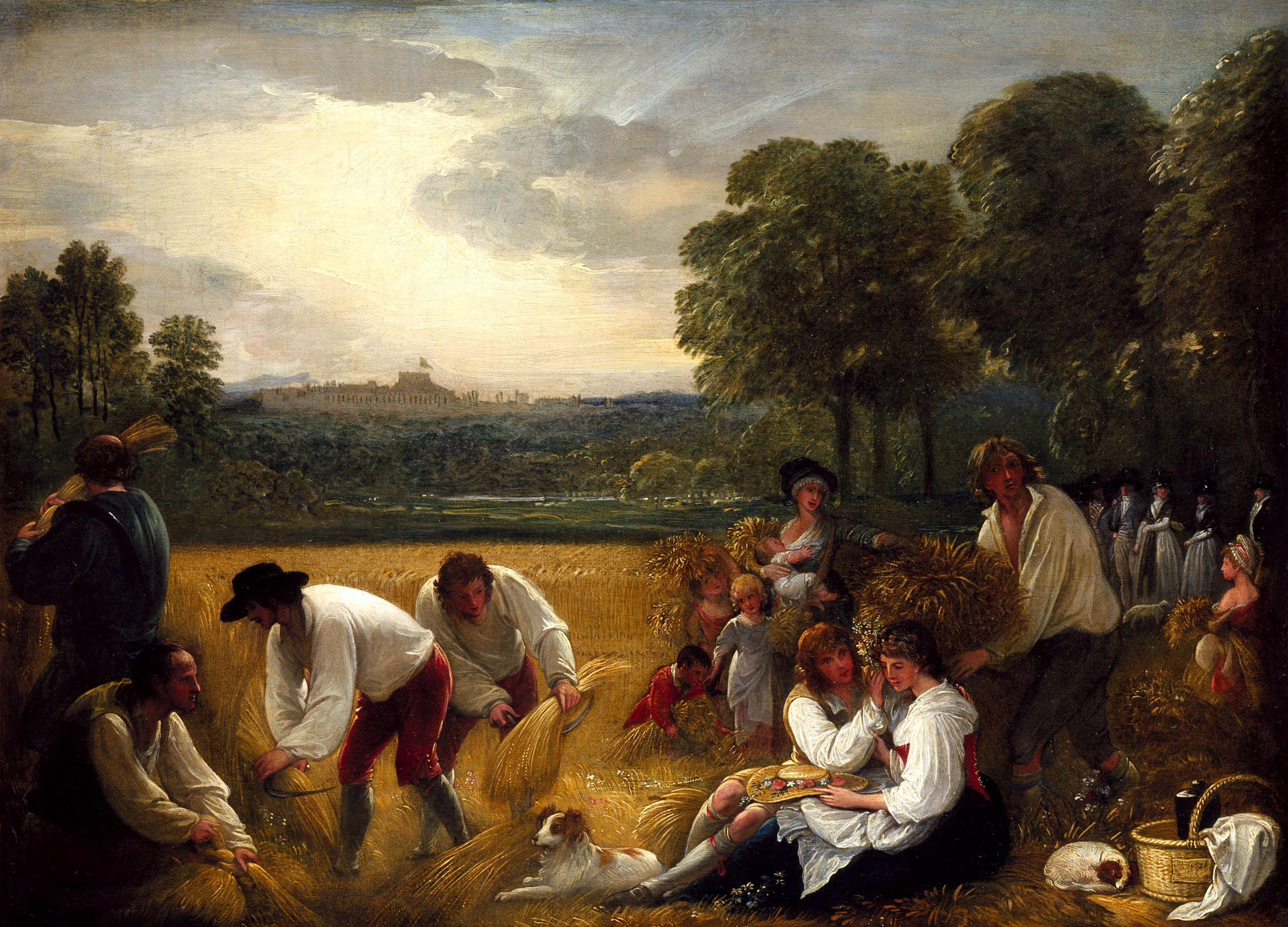
Harvesting at Windsor by Benjamin West

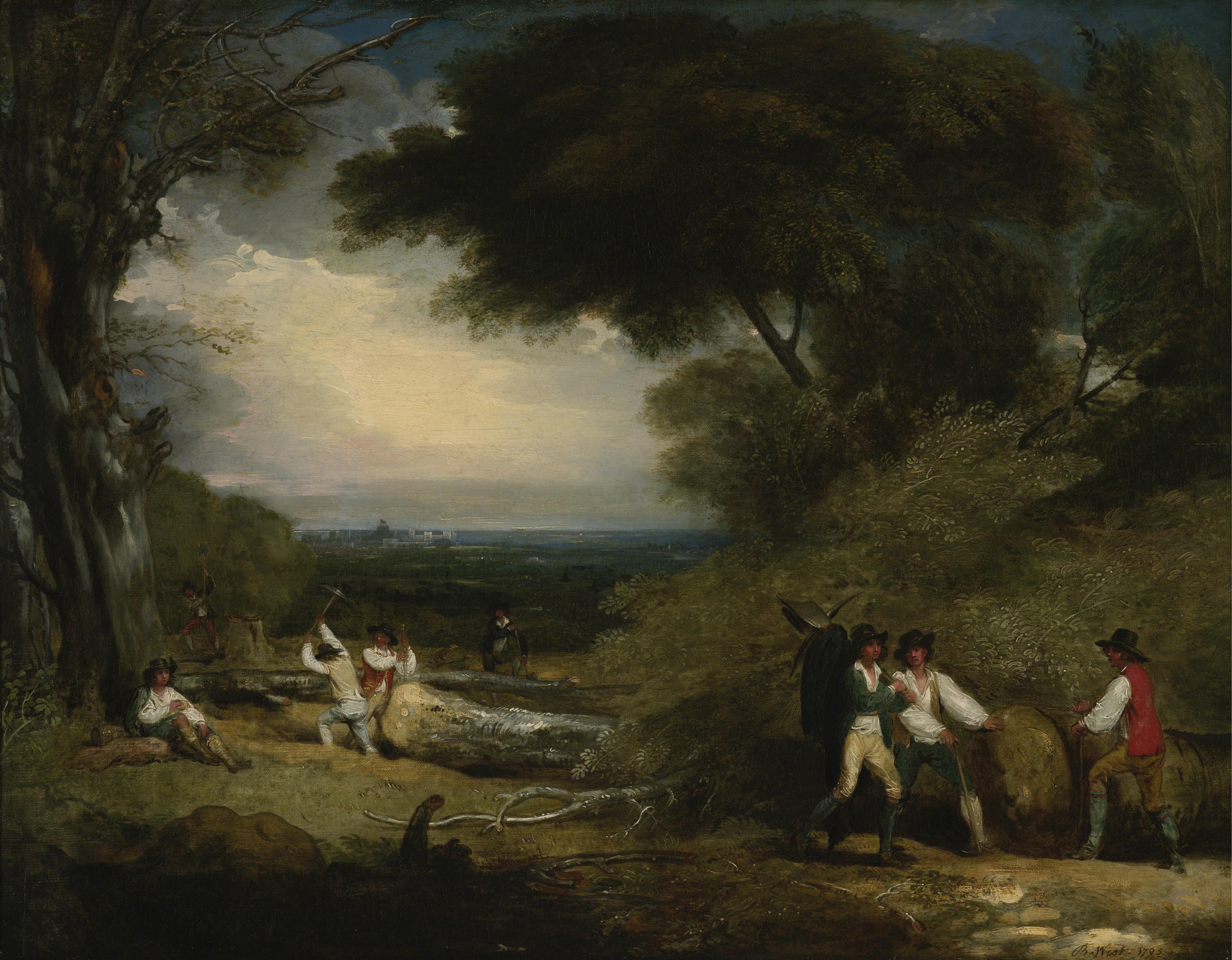
Woodcutters in Windsor Park by Benjamin West

== Bibliography ==
- Bailey, Anthony. J.M.W. Turner: Standing in the Sun. Tate Enterprises, 2013.
- Burwick, Frederick Goslee, Nancy Moore & Hoeveler Diane Long . The Encyclopedia of Romantic Literature. John Wiley & Sons, 2012.
- Levey, Michael. Sir Thomas Lawrence. Yale University Press, 2005.
