= Declaration of Independence Tablet =

Sculpture in Boston, Massachusetts, U.S.

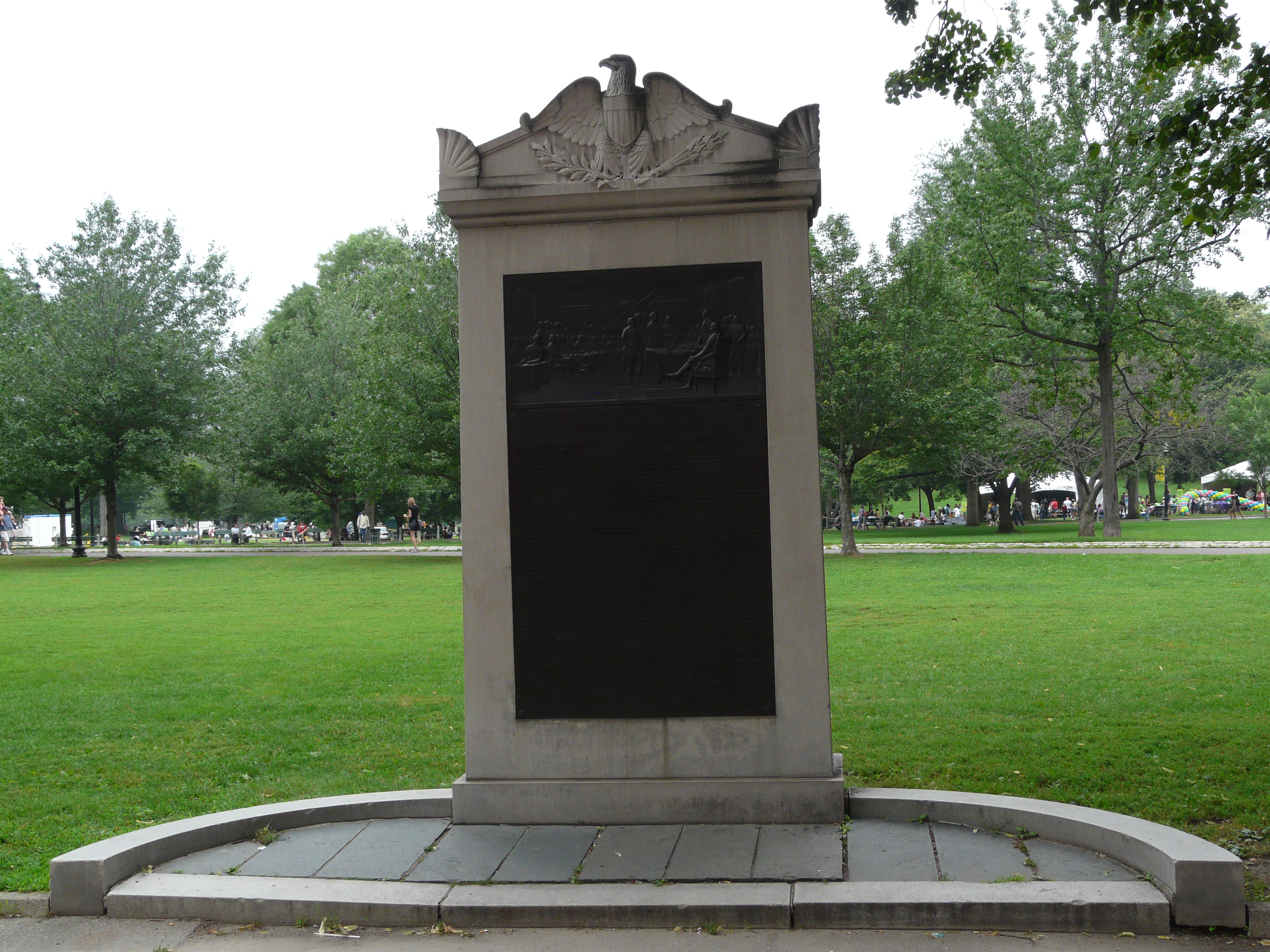
- The tablet in 2008
- Artist: John Francis Paramino
- Year: 1925
- Location: Boston, Massachusetts, U.S.; 42°21′16.7″N 71°3′50″W

Declaration of Independence Tablet is a 1925 sculpture by John Francis Paramino, installed at Boston Common, in Boston, Massachusetts, United States.

== Description and history ==
The bronze tablet is a copy of John Trumbull's 1818 Declaration of Independence painting, set into a granite block with an eagle carved at the top. The work was cleaned, colored, and recoated in 1988, and was surveyed as part of the Smithsonian Institution's "Save Outdoor Sculpture!" program in 1993.

== See also ==
- 1925 in art
- Founding Fathers of the United States
