= Declaration of Independence (painting) =

1818 painting by John Trumbull

- Artist: John Trumbull
- Year: commissioned 1817; purchased 1819; date of creation 1818; placed in U.S. Capitol rotunda 1826
- Medium: Oil-on-canvas
- Dimensions: 3.7 m × 5.5 m (12 ft × 18 ft)
- Location: U.S. Capitol, Washington, D.C., U.S.

Declaration of Independence is a 12-by-18-foot (3.7 by 5.5 m) oil-on-canvas painting by the American artist John Trumbull depicting the presentation of the draft of the Declaration of Independence to Congress. It was based on a much smaller version of the same scene, presently held by the Yale University Art Gallery. Trumbull painted many of the figures in the picture from life, and visited Independence Hall to depict the chamber where the Second Continental Congress met. The oil-on-canvas work was commissioned in 1817, purchased in 1819, and placed in the United States Capitol rotunda in 1826.

The painting is sometimes incorrectly described as depicting the signing of the Declaration of Independence. The painting shows the five-man drafting committee presenting their draft of the Declaration to the Congress, an event that took place on June 28, 1776, and not the signing of the famous copy, which took place mainly on August 2.

The painting shows 42 of the 56 signers of the Declaration; Trumbull originally intended to include all 56 signers but was unable to obtain likenesses for all of them. He also depicted several participants in the debate who did not sign the document, including John Dickinson, who declined to sign. Trumbull had no portrait of Benjamin Harrison V to work with, but his son Benjamin Harrison VI was said to resemble his father, so Trumbull painted him instead. Similarly, Trumbull painted Rufus Hopkins, who resembled his father Stephen Hopkins, for whom no portrait was available. As the Declaration was debated and signed over a period of time when membership in Congress changed, the men featured in the painting never were in the same room at the same time.

== Key to historical figures depicted in the painting ==
Trumbull's Declaration of Independence Clickable image: Point at a face to identify the person, click to go to the corresponding article. Click anywhere else in the image to go to the image's file page and view a larger version.

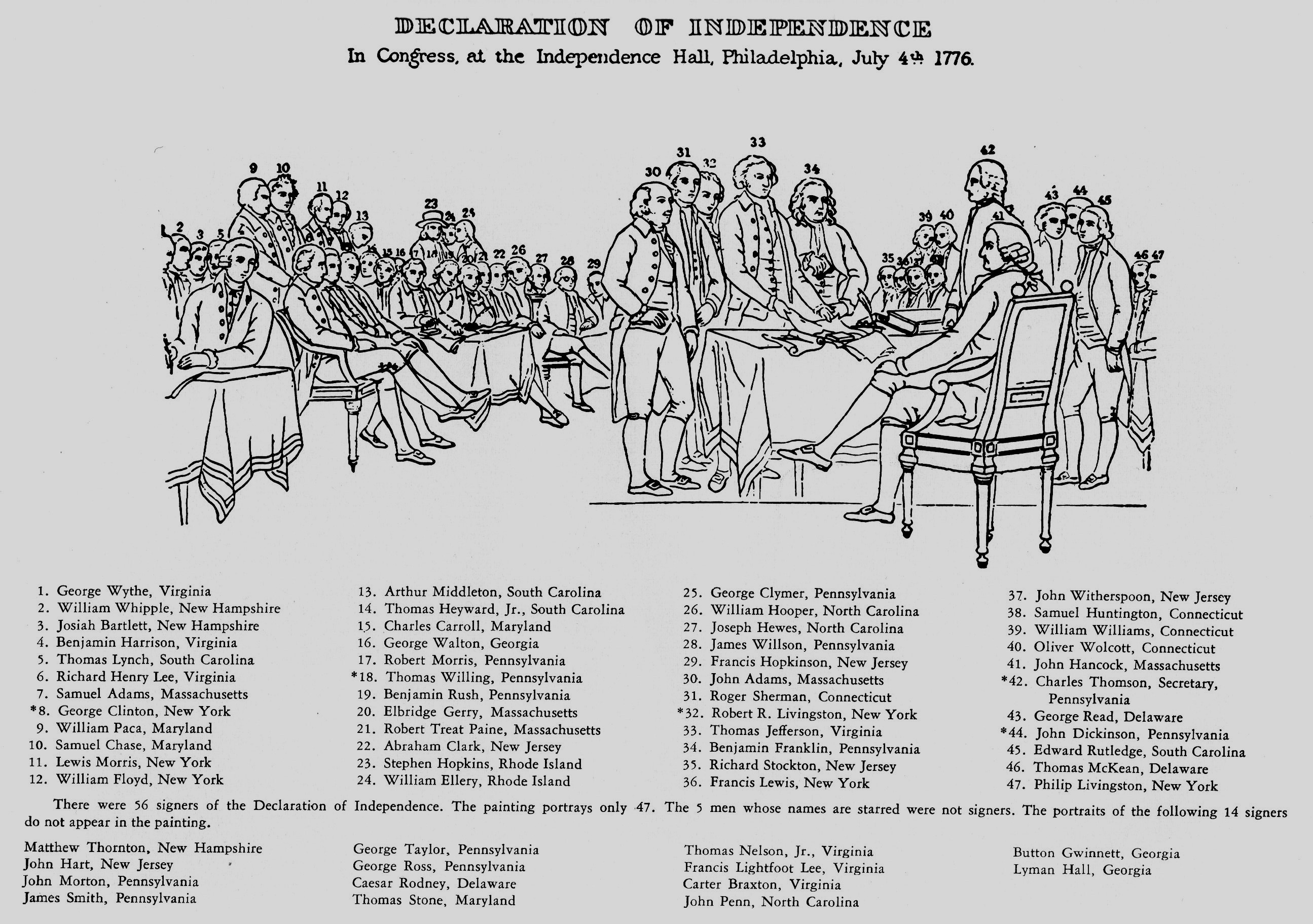
U.S. government's key to the painting

The key to the 47 figures in the painting follows the numbering used by the U.S. government publication "Art of the Capitol" (in the illustration of the key shown in this section) but provides a different (hopefully clearer) description of which figure is where in the painting, so numbers are not entirely in order.

Key to figures (in each group, listed from left to right):

Four men seated on the far left:

- 1. George Wythe
- 2. William Whipple
- 3. Josiah Bartlett
- 5. Thomas Lynch Jr.

Seated at the table on the left:

- 4. Benjamin Harrison

Seated together to the right of Harrison and in front of the standing figures:

- 6. Richard Henry Lee
- 7. Samuel Adams
- 8. George Clinton†

Five figures standing together on the left:

- 9. William Paca
- 10. Samuel Chase
- 11. Lewis Morris
- 12. William Floyd
- 13. Arthur Middleton

Three seated figures in the back between the two sets of standing figures:

- 14. Thomas Heyward Jr.
- 15. Charles Carroll
- 16. George Walton

Set of three figures standing together in the back:

- 23. Stephen Hopkins (wearing a hat)
- 24. William Ellery
- 25. George Clymer

Ten figures seated:

- 17. Robert Morris (first on the left at the table)
- 18. Thomas Willing†
- 19. Benjamin Rush
- 20. Elbridge Gerry
- 21. Robert Treat Paine
- 22. Abraham Clark
- 26. William Hooper
- 27. Joseph Hewes
- 28. James Wilson
- 29. Francis Hopkinson

Five figures standing in front (the Committee of Five):

- 30. John Adams
- 31. Roger Sherman
- 32. Robert R. Livingston†
- 33. Thomas Jefferson
- 34. Benjamin Franklin

Four background figures seated together near the right corner of the room:

- 35. Richard Stockton
- 36. Francis Lewis
- 37. John Witherspoon
- 38. Samuel Huntington

Two figures standing in the right corner of the room:

- 39. William Williams
- 40. Oliver Wolcott

Two foreground figures at the central table:

- 42. Charles Thomson (standing)†
- 41. John Hancock (seated)

Three figures standing at right:

- 43. George Read
- 44. John Dickinson†
- 45. Edward Rutledge

Two figures seated at far right:

- 46. Thomas McKean
- 47. Philip Livingston

(Note: † - Not a signer of the final Declaration of Independence but depicted in painting. Although Charles Thomson was one of two members listed by name in the earlier Dunlap Broadside as having attested to the Declaration, and many historians believe he had signed the original document that was lost. Clinton was not present at the signing of the Declaration.)

== Unpainted signers ==
There were 14 signers of the Declaration who did not appear in the painting:

- Matthew Thornton (New Hampshire)
- John Hart (New Jersey)
- John Morton (Pennsylvania)
- James Smith (Pennsylvania)
- George Taylor (Pennsylvania)
- George Ross (Pennsylvania)
- Caesar Rodney (Delaware)
- Thomas Stone (Maryland)
- Thomas Nelson, Jr. (Virginia)
- Francis Lightfoot Lee (Virginia)
- Carter Braxton (Virginia)
- John Penn (North Carolina)
- Button Gwinnett (Georgia)
- Lyman Hall (Georgia)

== On U.S. currency and postage stamps ==
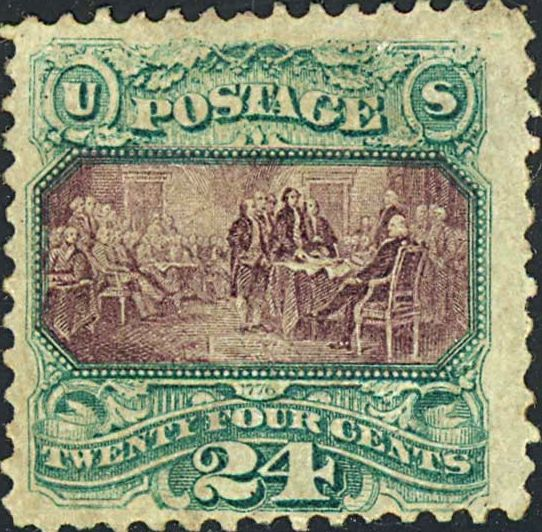
The painting was pictured on an 1869 United States 24-cent definitive postage stamp.

Trumbull's Declaration of Independence signing scene painting has been depicted several times on United States currency and postage stamps. It was first used on the reverse side of the $100 National Bank Note that was issued in 1863. The depiction was engraved by Frederick Girsch of the American Bank Note Company. The same steel engraving was used on the 24¢ stamp issued six years later as part of the 1869 pictorial series of definitive U.S. postage stamps.

Trumbull's painting is presently depicted on the reverse of the two-dollar bill. Featured in it are 40 of the 47 figures from Trumbull's painting. Cut out from the scene are: the farthest four figures on the left—George Wythe, William Whipple, Josiah Bartlett, and Thomas Lynch, Jr.; the farthest two figures on the right—Thomas McKean and Philip Livingston; and one of three figures seated in the left rear—George Walton. Additionally, two unrecognized figures were added: one in between Samuel Chase and Lewis Morris and another between James Wilson and Francis Hopkinson, bringing the total number of figures shown in this presentation scene to 42.

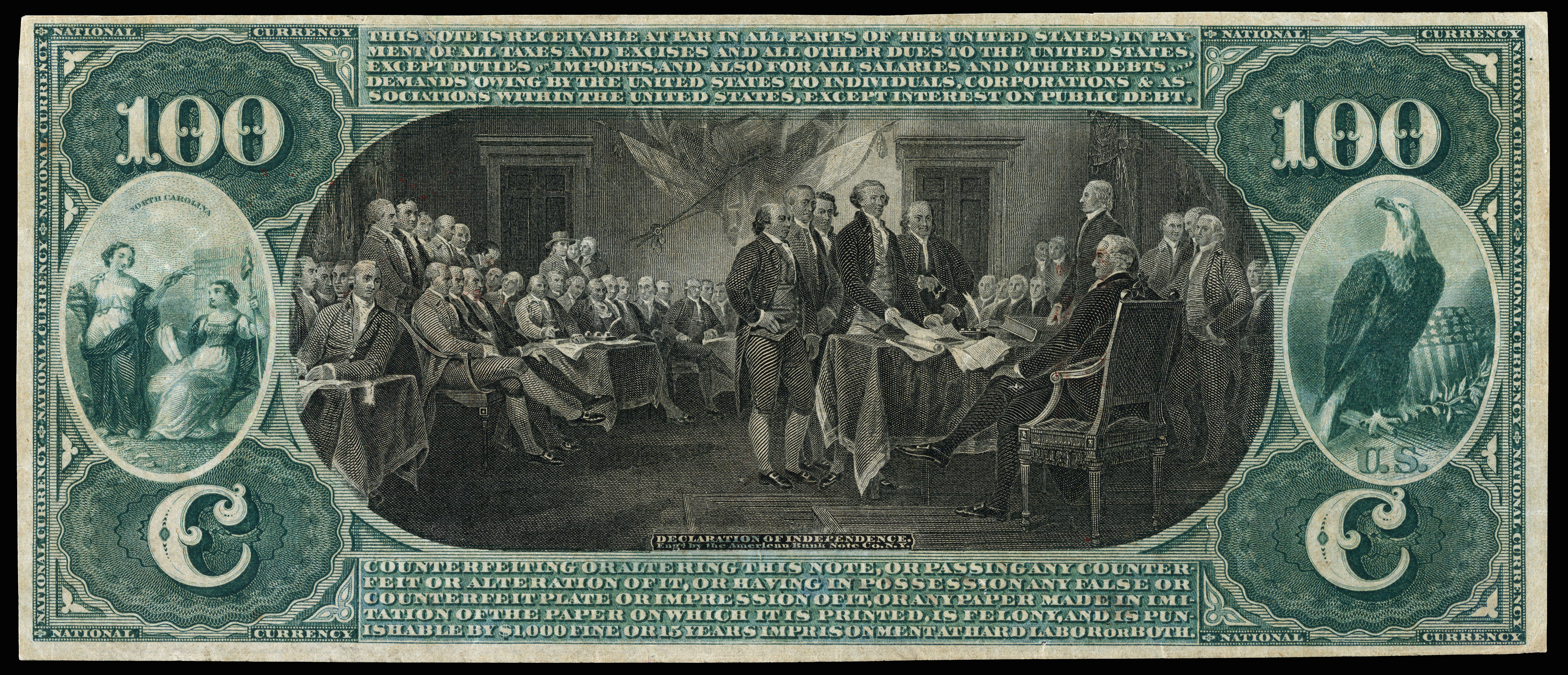
1863 United States 100-dollar National Bank Note (reverse)

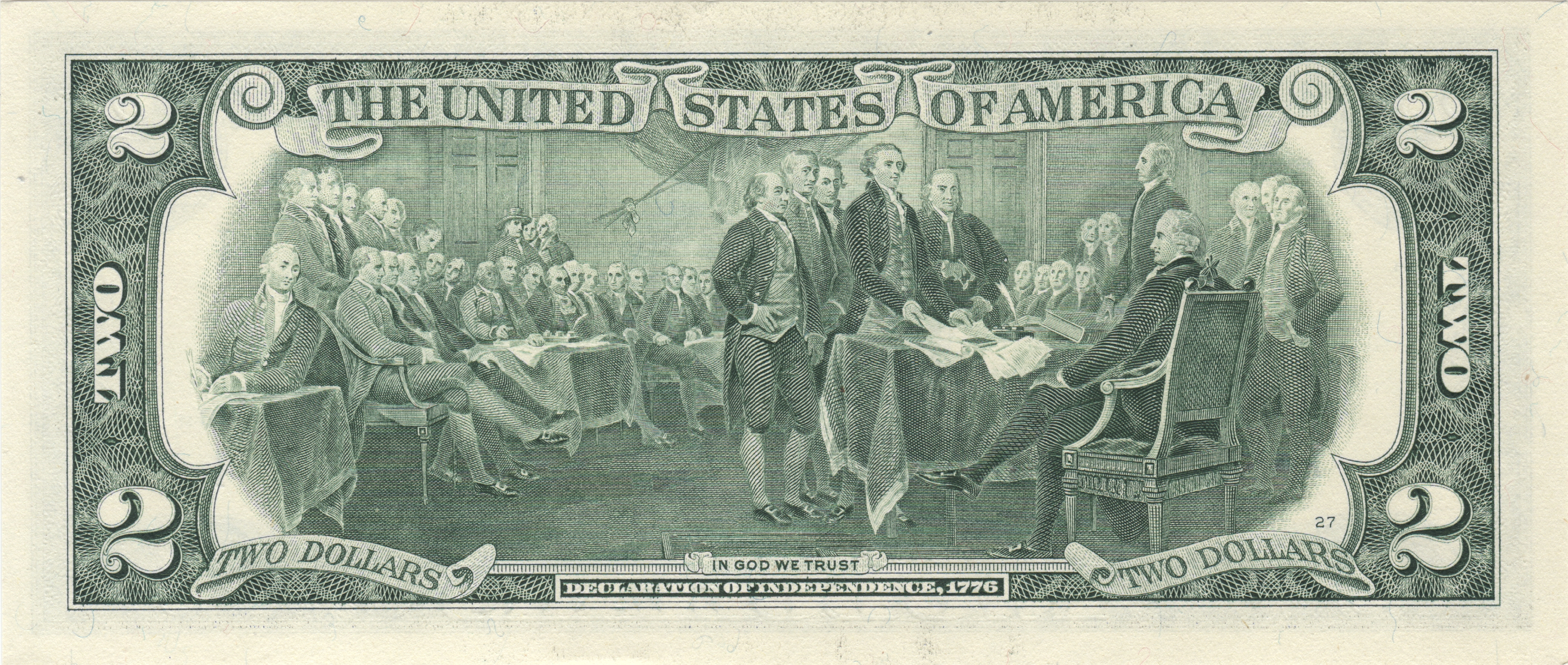
1976 United States two-dollar bill (reverse)

== Other versions ==
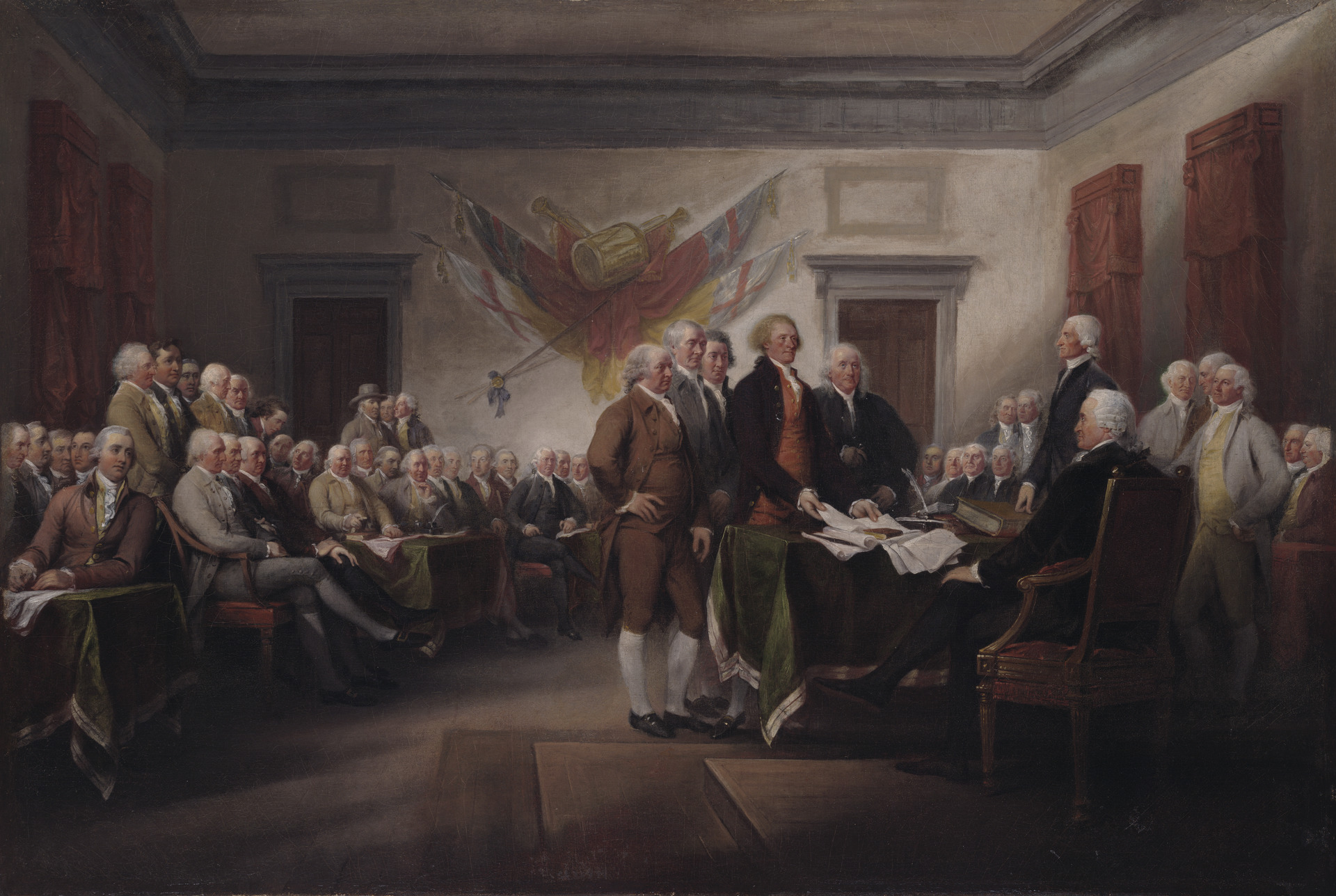
The Declaration of Independence, July 4, 1776, John Trumbull, (1786–1820), Yale University Art Gallery

Trumbull painted a smaller version (only 20.875 by 31 inches (53.02 cm × 78.74 cm)) entitled The Declaration of Independence, July 4, 1776 (1786–1820) that is now on view at the Yale University Art Gallery in New Haven, Connecticut.

== Legacy and interpretations ==
In 2017, the company Ancestry.com restaged the painting with the 29 living descendants of the men depicted in Trumbull's painting as part of an advertising campaign called "Declaration Descendants". The campaign included two short films and ran on digital and social media platforms. Shannon Lanier, a descendant of Thomas Jefferson, said: "When you see the new picture, the new image, it's a picture of diverse people. Black, white, Hispanic, Native American—a little bit of everything—Asian, and that's more of a representation of this country."

In the 2008 HBO miniseries John Adams, in one of the final scenes of the series, the painter John Trumbull shows his massive mural to an elderly John Adams, expecting the latter's approval. While staring at the painting, Adams mentions, "They're all dead ... except me and Jefferson." He then expresses his disapproval of the work to Turnbull, leading to a brief argument between the men about the difference between artistic license and historical accuracy. The scene itself is entirely fictional; Adams would have been 90 years old and in his last year of life had he been shown the painting in the Capitol Rotunda as depicted. The scene serves, however, as a critique of the fictionalization and mythologization of American history itself. Adams himself states, "It is very bad history".

Although Thomas Jefferson appears to be stepping on John Adams' shoe in the painting, which many thought symbolized their relationship as friendly rivals, upon closer examination it can be seen that their feet are merely close together. This part of the image was correctly depicted on the two-dollar bill version.

On the farthest wall hangs a display of trumpets, drum, and regimental colours captured from British regiments. This is not depicted in all versions, most notably the one seen on the two-dollar bill.

== See also ==
- Congress Voting Independence, a similar painting by Robert Edge Pine, 1784-1788
- Declaration of Independence Tablet, Boston Common
- Scene at the Signing of the Constitution of the United States – a 1940 painting depicting members of the 1787 Constitutional Convention by Howard Chandler Christy.
- Founding Fathers of the United States
- List of paintings of Thomas Jefferson
- Syng inkstand, pictured in the painting
