= Mather Brown =

American artist (1761–1831)

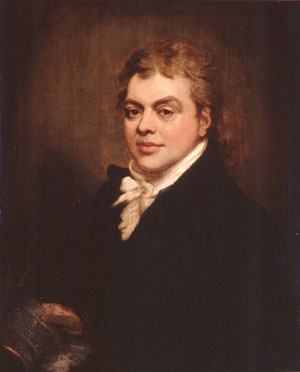
- Self-portrait, 1812
- Born: Baptized 11 October 1761; Boston, Province of Massachusetts Bay, British America
- Died: 25 May 1831 (aged 69); London, England
- Known for: Portrait and historical painter

Mather Brown (baptized 11 October 1761 – 25 May 1831) was an American painter who was born in Boston, Massachusetts and was active in England.

== Early life and education ==
Brown was the son of Gawen and Elizabeth (Byles) Brown, and descended from the Rev. Increase Mather on his mother's side. He was taught by his aunt and around 1773 (age 12) became a pupil of Gilbert Stuart. He arrived in London in 1781 to further his training in Benjamin West's studio, entered the Royal Academy schools in 1782 with plans to be a miniature painter, and began to exhibit a year later.

== Painting career ==
In 1784, he painted two religious paintings for the church of St. Mary's-in-the-Strand, which led Brown to found a partnership with the painter Daniel Orme for the commercialization of these and other works through exhibition and the sale of engravings. Among these were large paintings of scenes from English history, as well as scenes from Shakespeare's plays. However, despite their success he began to concentrate on portraiture. His first successes were with American sitters, among others his patron John Adams and family in 1784–85; this painting is now in the Boston Athenæum. In the spring of 1786, he began painting the earliest known portrait of Thomas Jefferson, who was visiting London. He also painted Charles Bulfinch the same year. He was elected a Foreign Honorary Member of the American Academy of Arts and Sciences in 1798.

His 1788 full-length portrait of Prince Frederick Augustus in the uniform of Colonel of the Coldstream Guards led to appointment as History and Portrait Painter to the Prince, later the Duke of York and Albany. Other paintings include the Prince of Wales, later George IV (about 1789), Queen Charlotte, and Cornwallis. A self-portrait now belongs to the American Antiquarian Society, Worcester, Massachusetts.

== Later life and death ==
A falling off patronage in the mid-1790s, and failure to be elected to the Royal Academy, led Brown to leave London in 1808 for Bath, Bristol, and Liverpool. He settled in Manchester, returning to London almost two decades later, in 1824, where, even after West's death, he continued to imitate his teacher's style of painting. Unable to secure commissions, Brown eventually died in poverty in London.

== Gallery ==
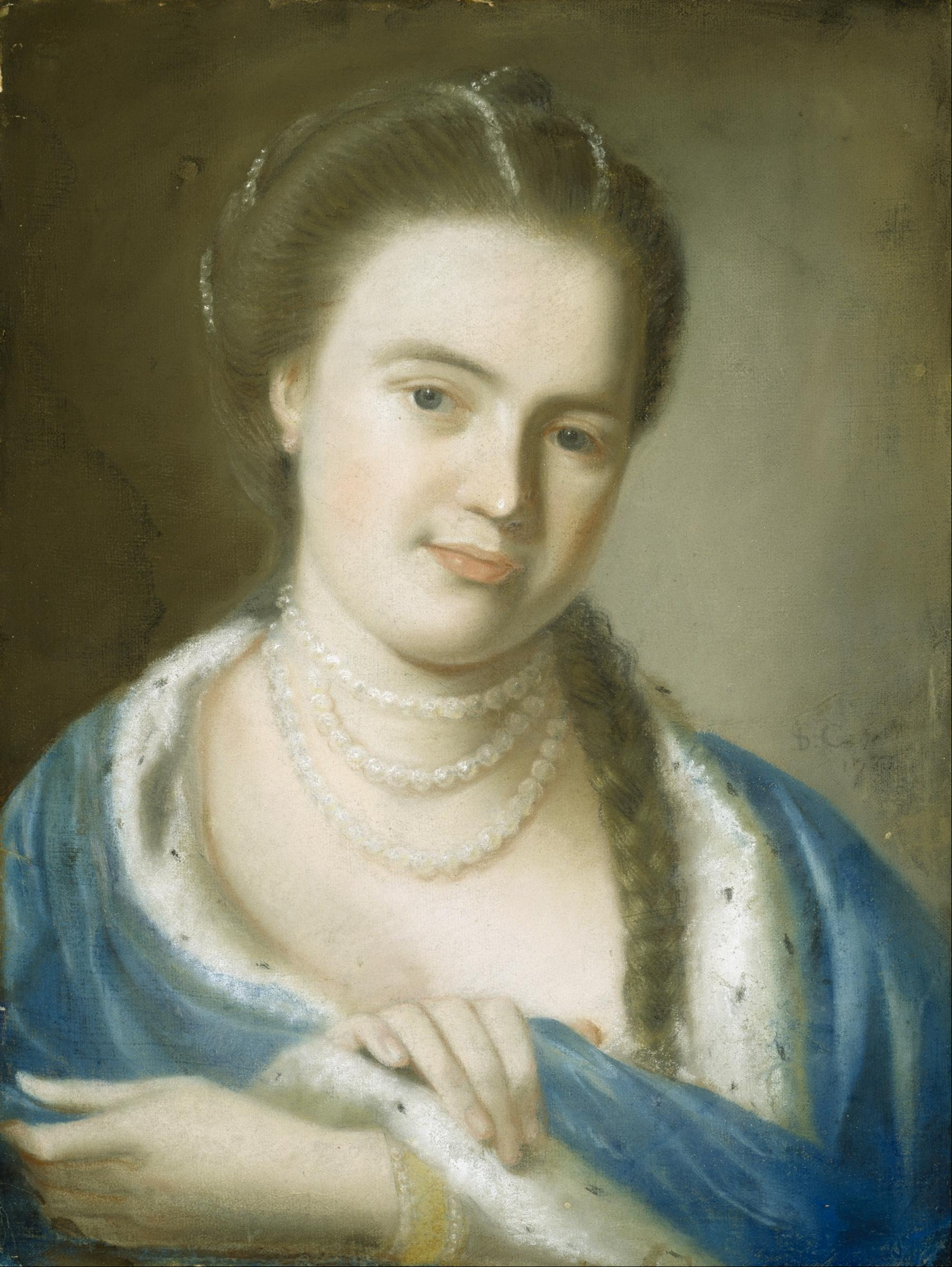
1763 portrait by John Singleton Copley of Elizabeth Byles Brown, Mather Brown's mother

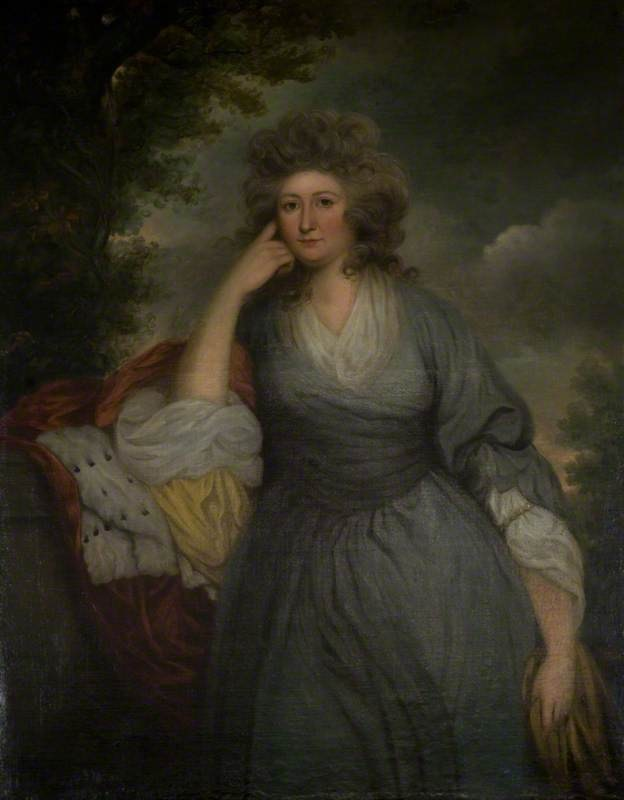
Anne Watts, wife of the 11th Earl of Cassillis

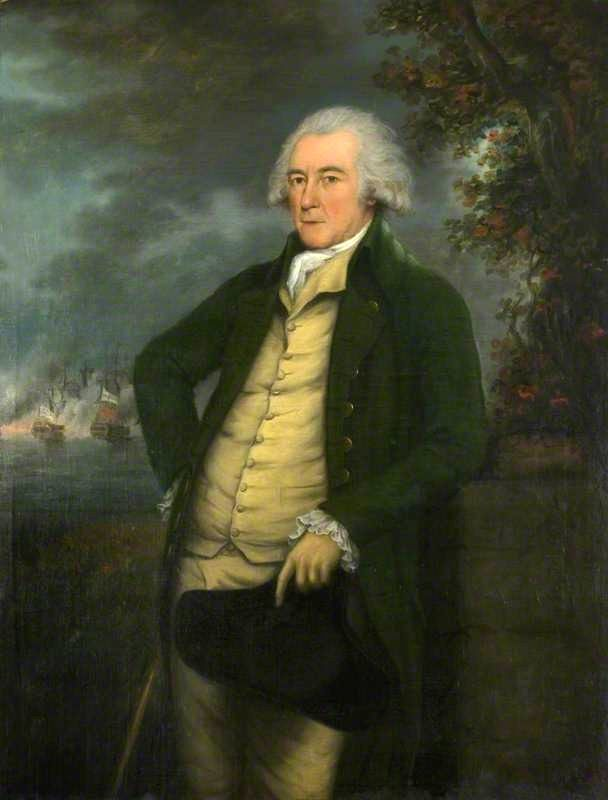
Portrait of 11th Earl Of Cassilis

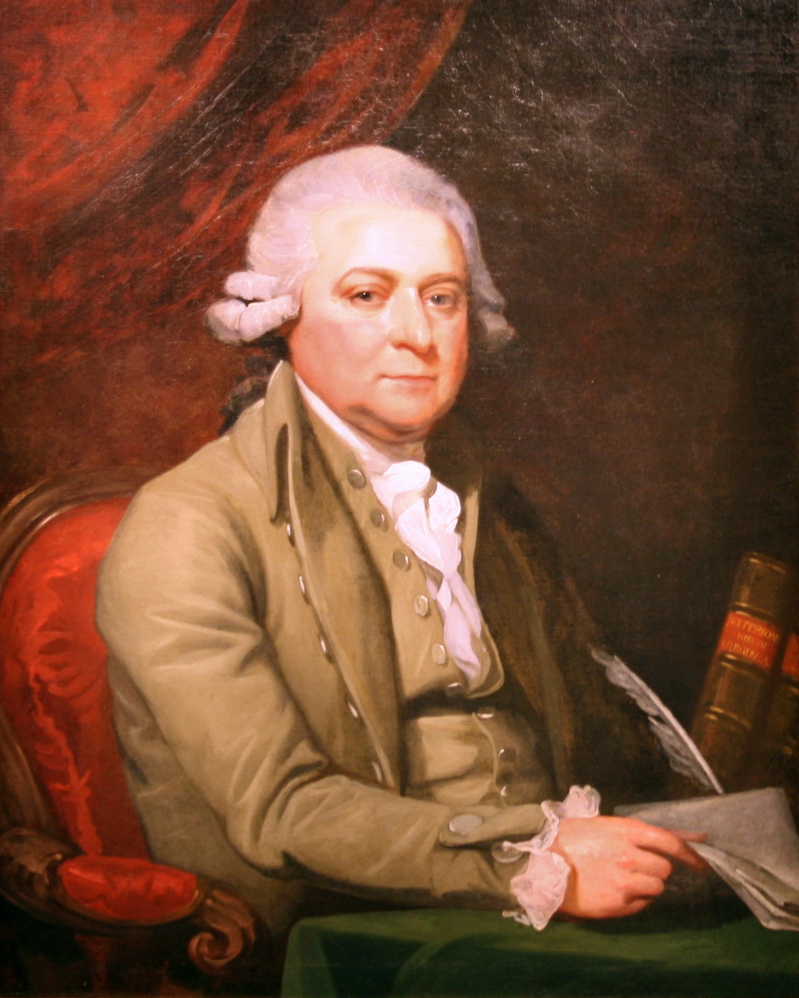
Portrait of John Adams 1785

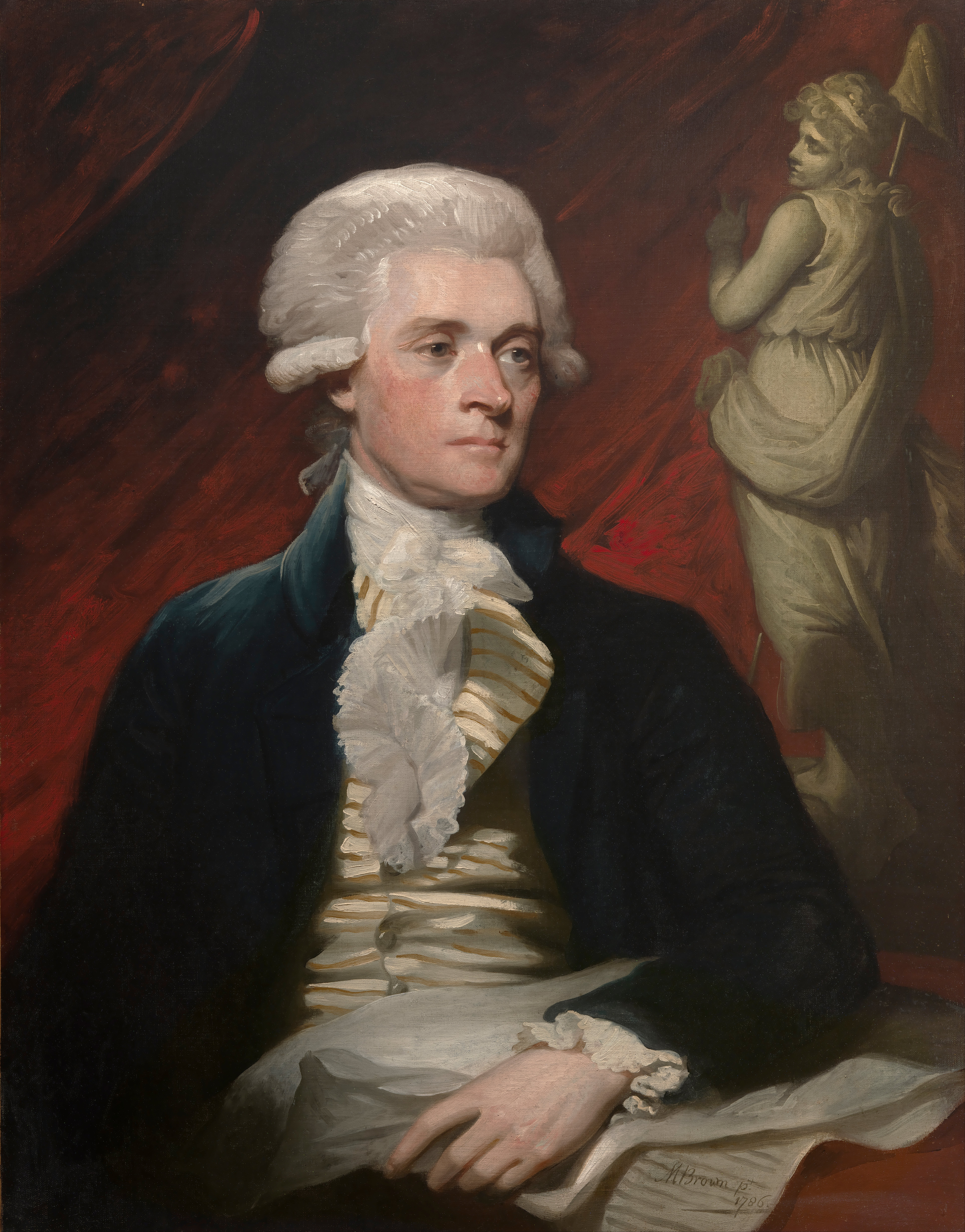
Portrait of Thomas Jefferson while in London in 1786

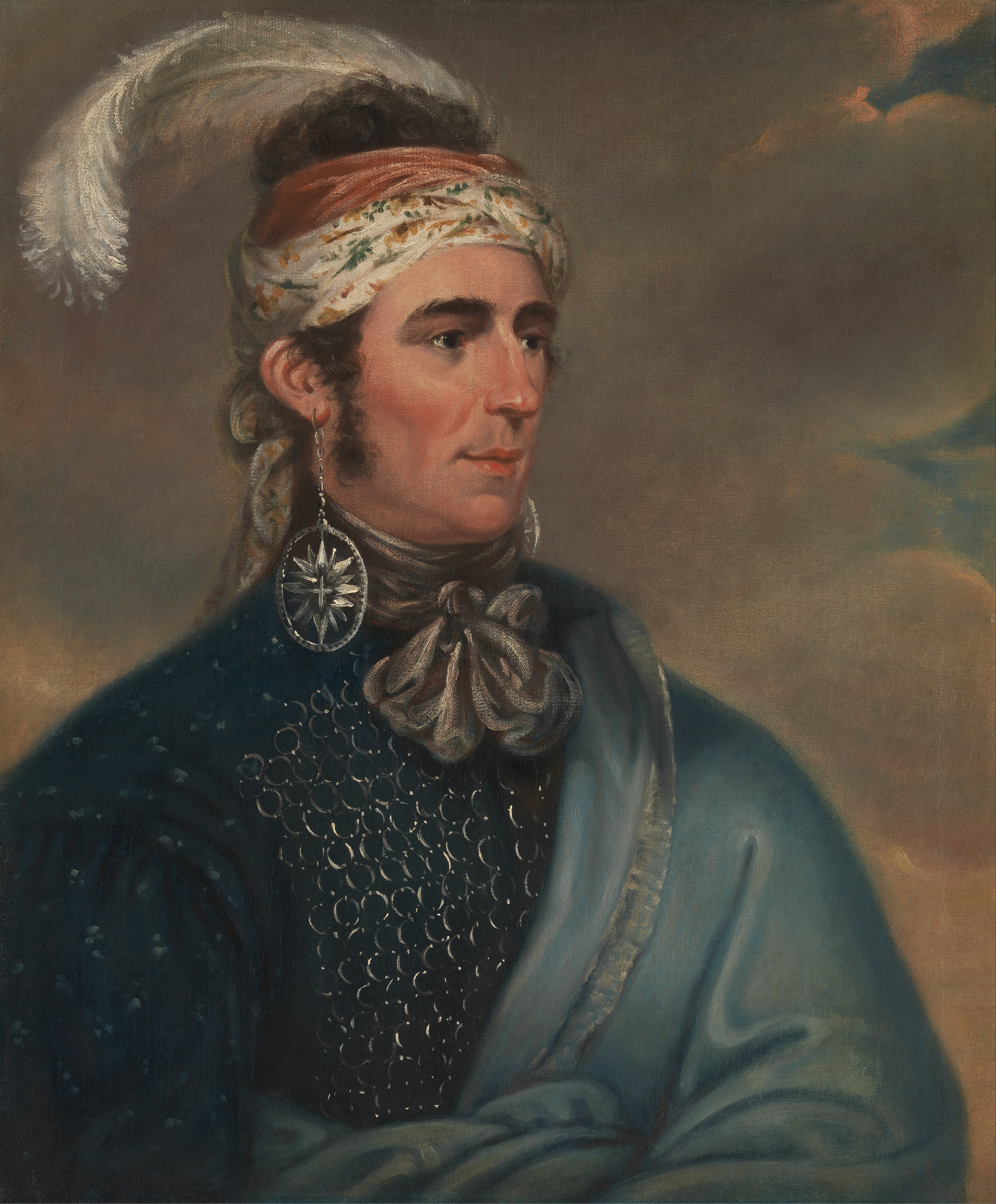
Portrait of Major John Norton as Mohawk Chief Teyoninhokarawen by Mather Brown, ca. 1805. Yale Center for British Art

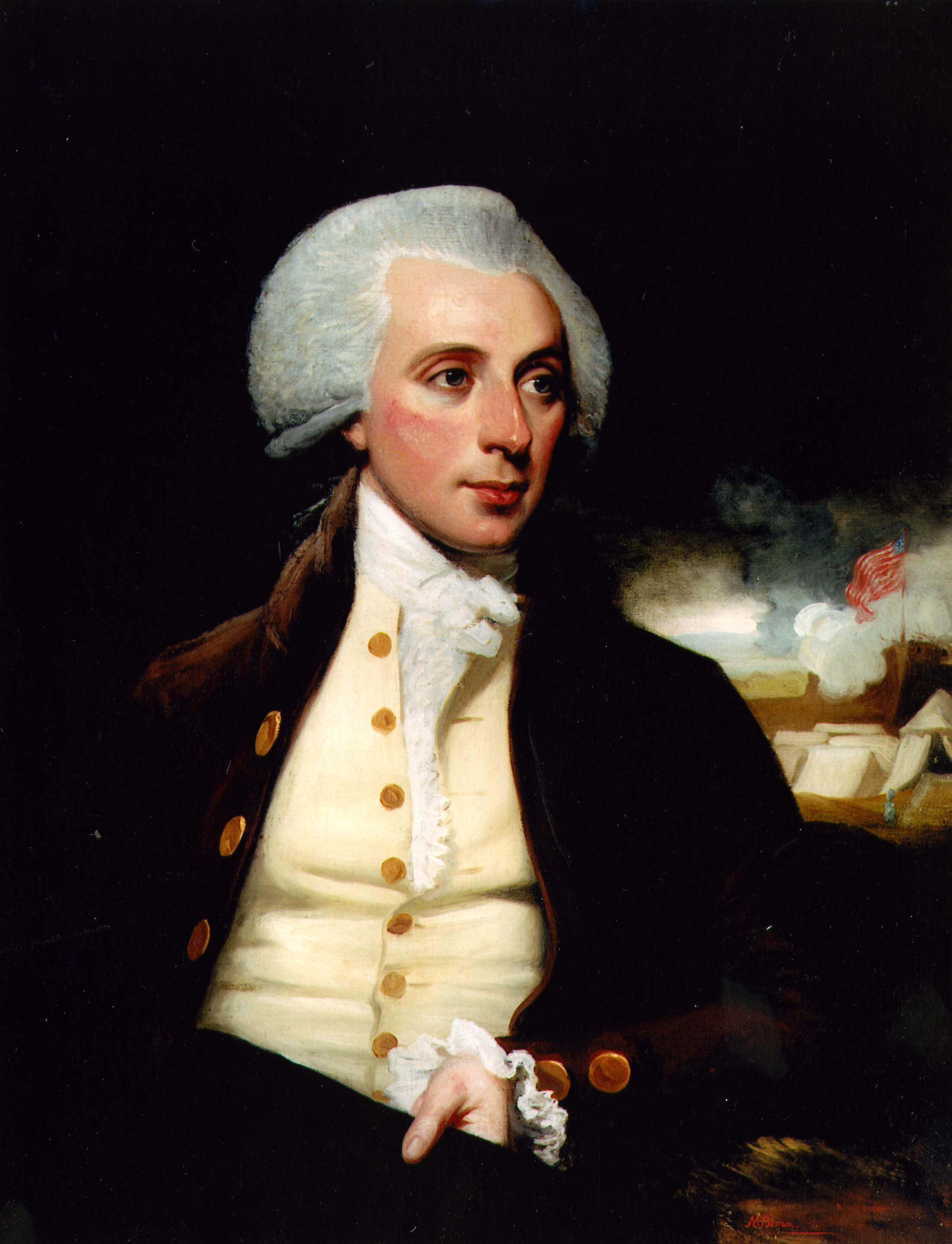
Portrait of William Stephen Smith 1786

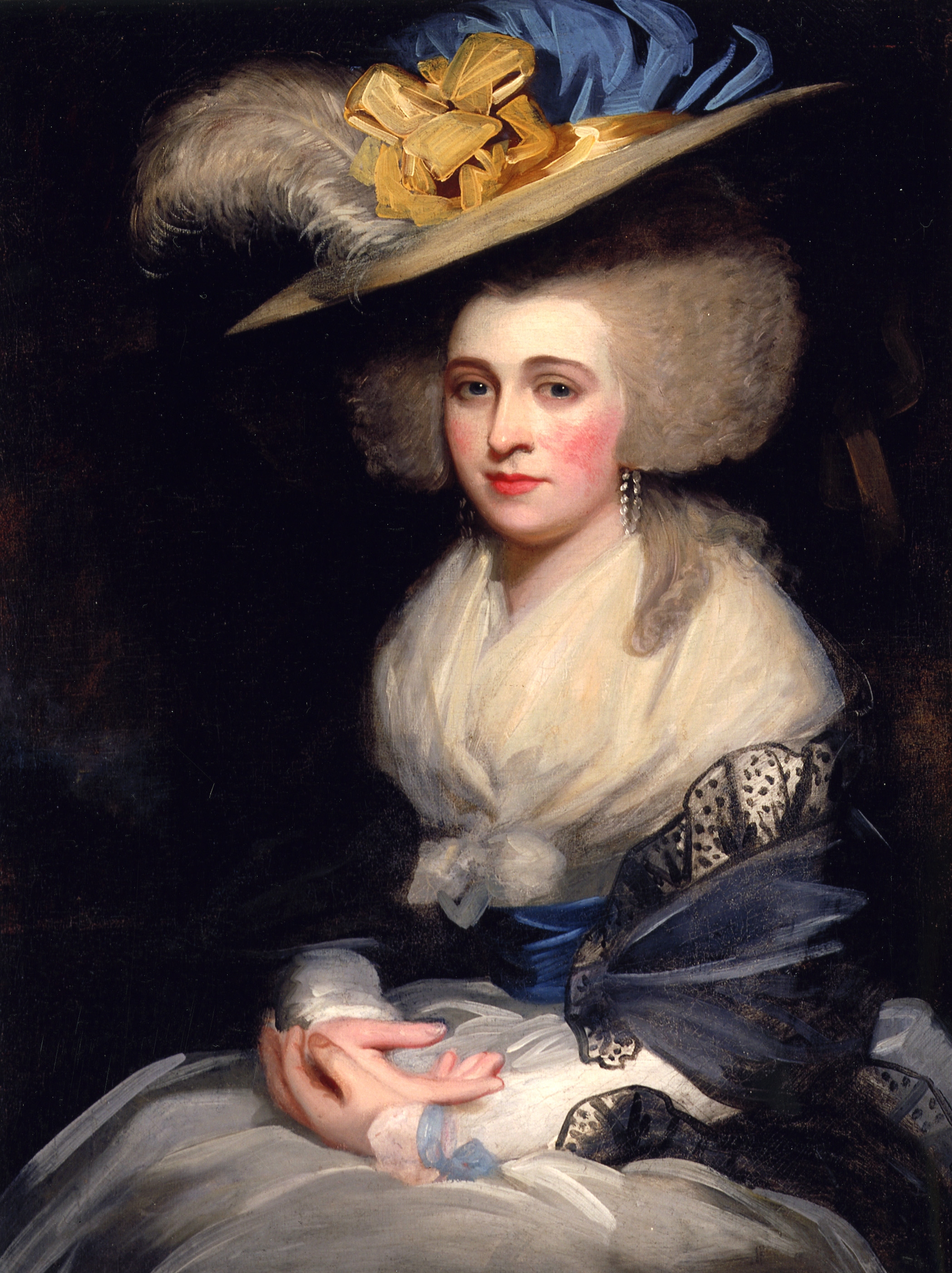
Portrait of Abigail (Adams) Smith 1785

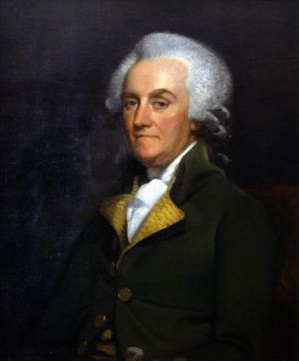
Portrait of William Franklin

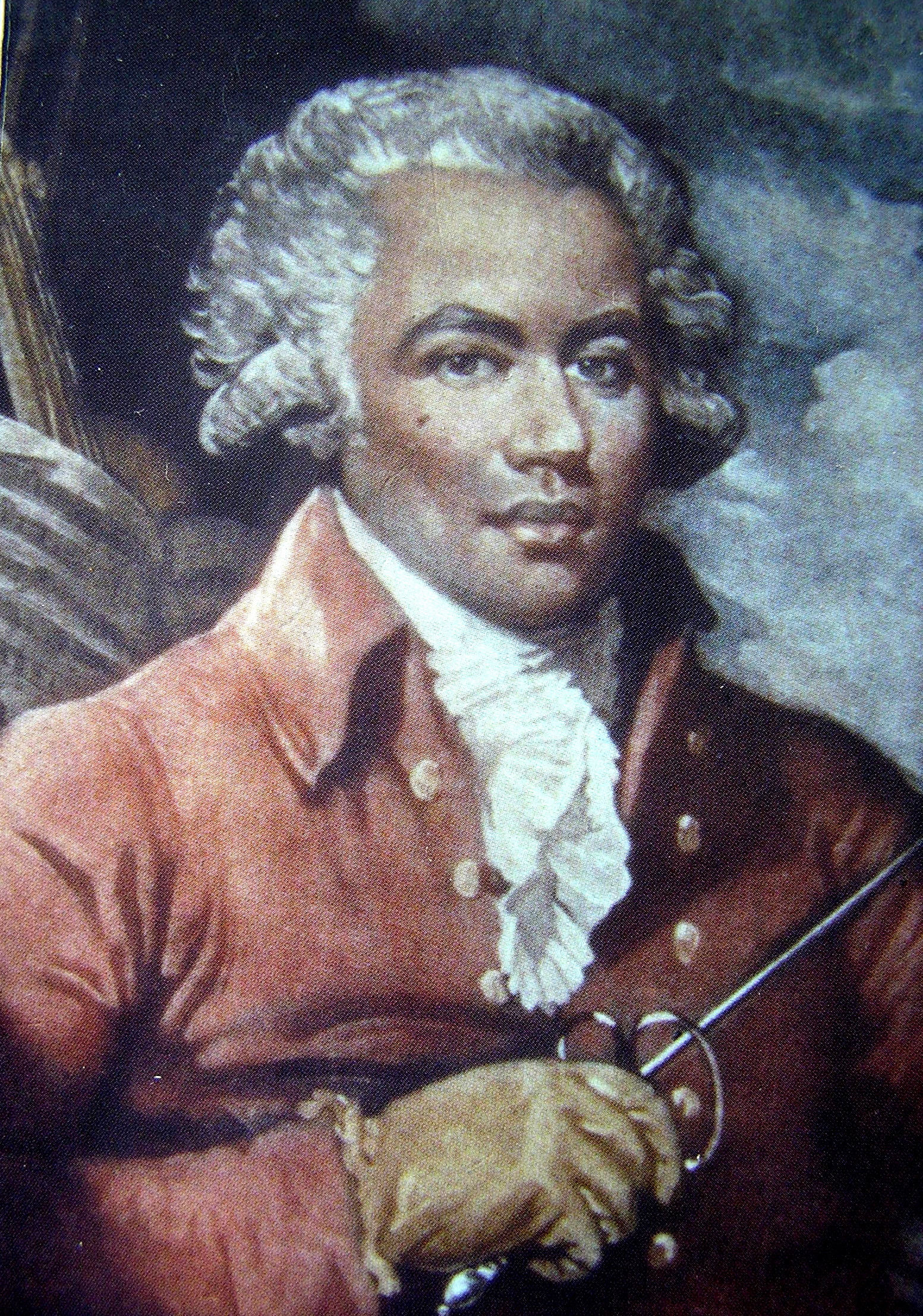
Portrait of virtuoso violinist and champion fencer Chevalier de Saint-Georges in 1787

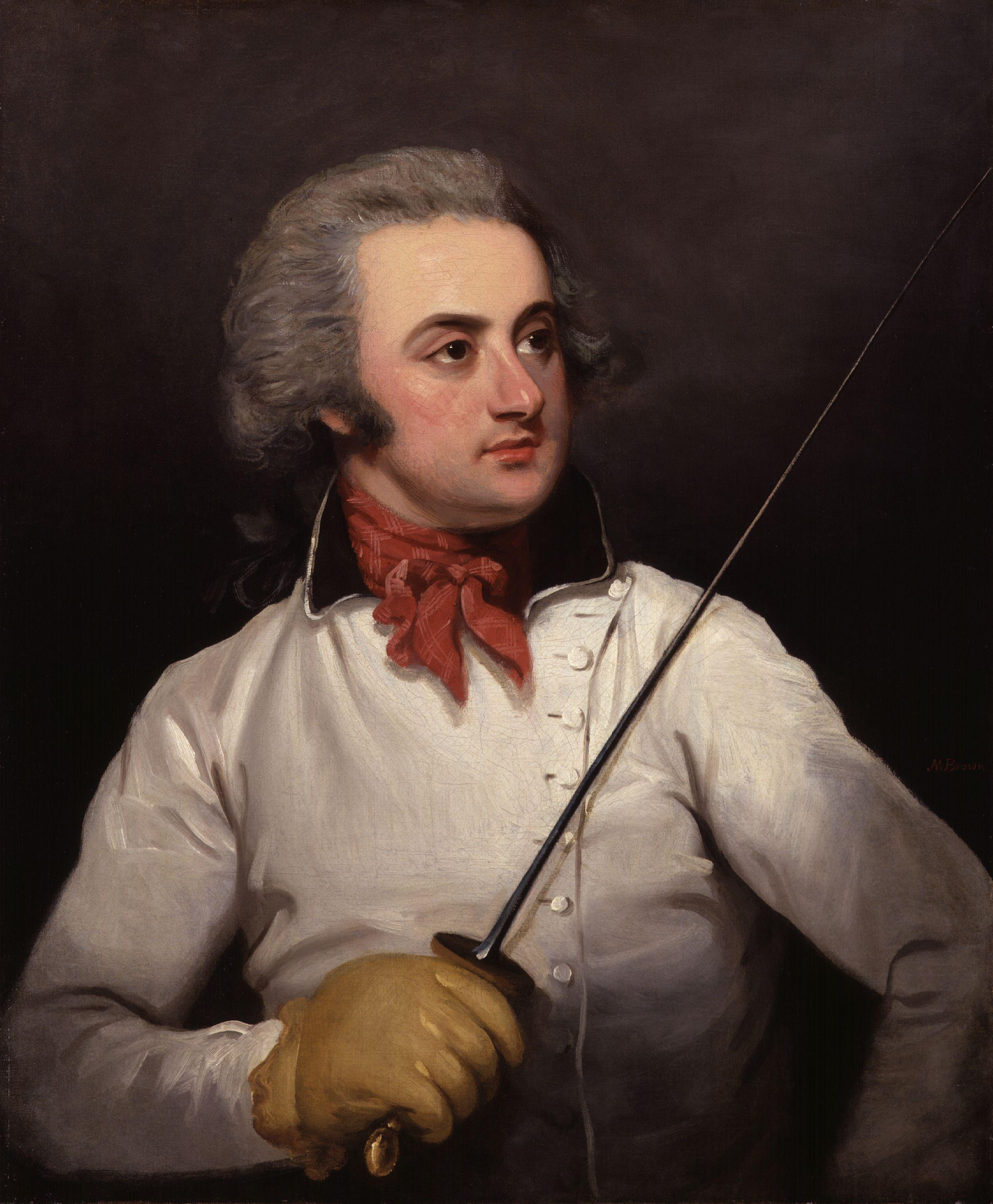
Portrait of Henry Angelo, 1790

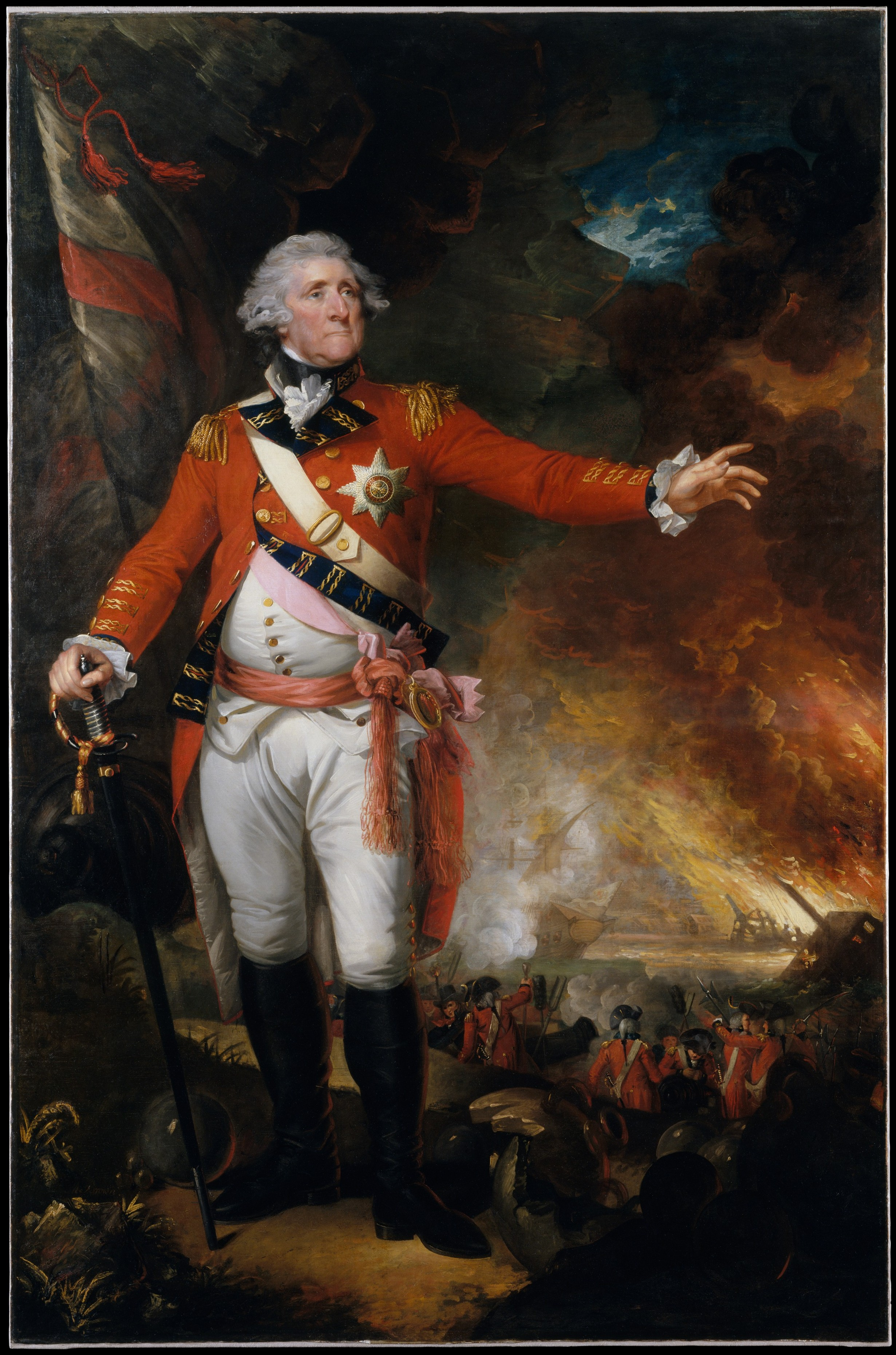
General George Eliott, 1790

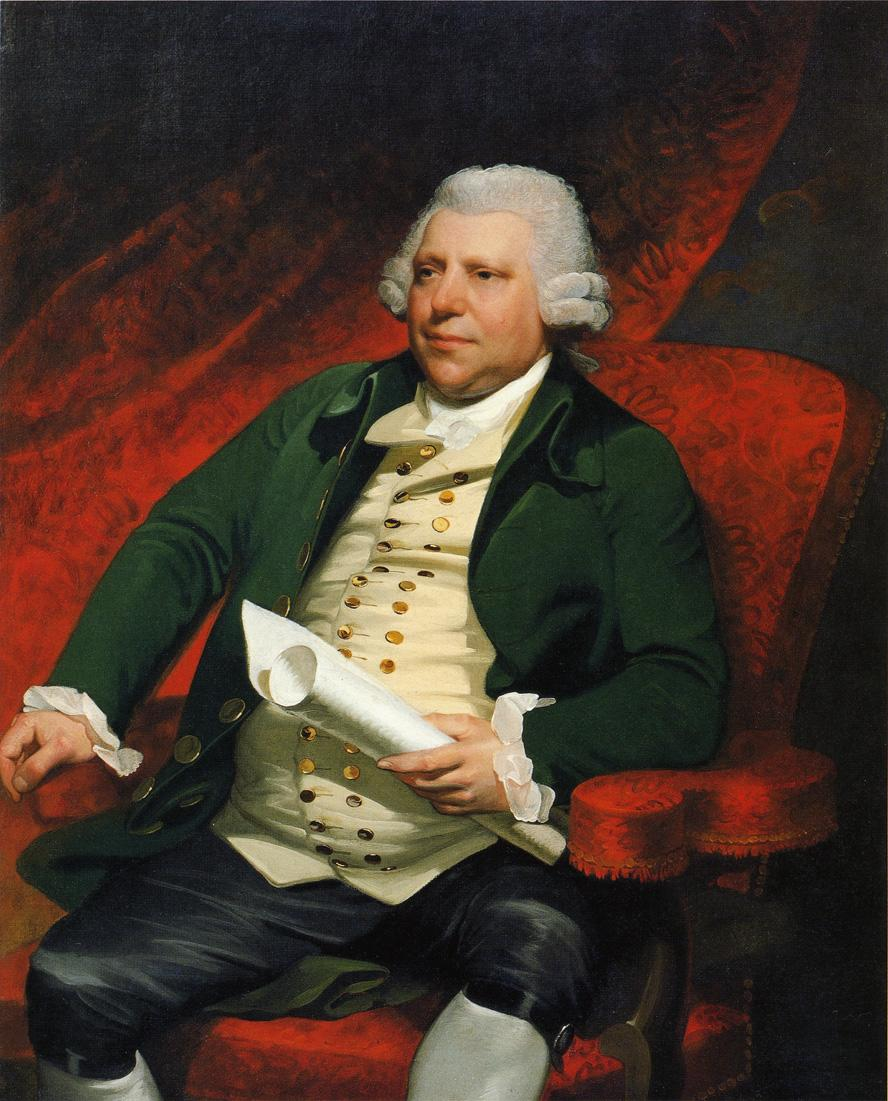
Portrait of Richard Arkwright, 1790

Louis XVI Saying Farewell to His Family, 1793

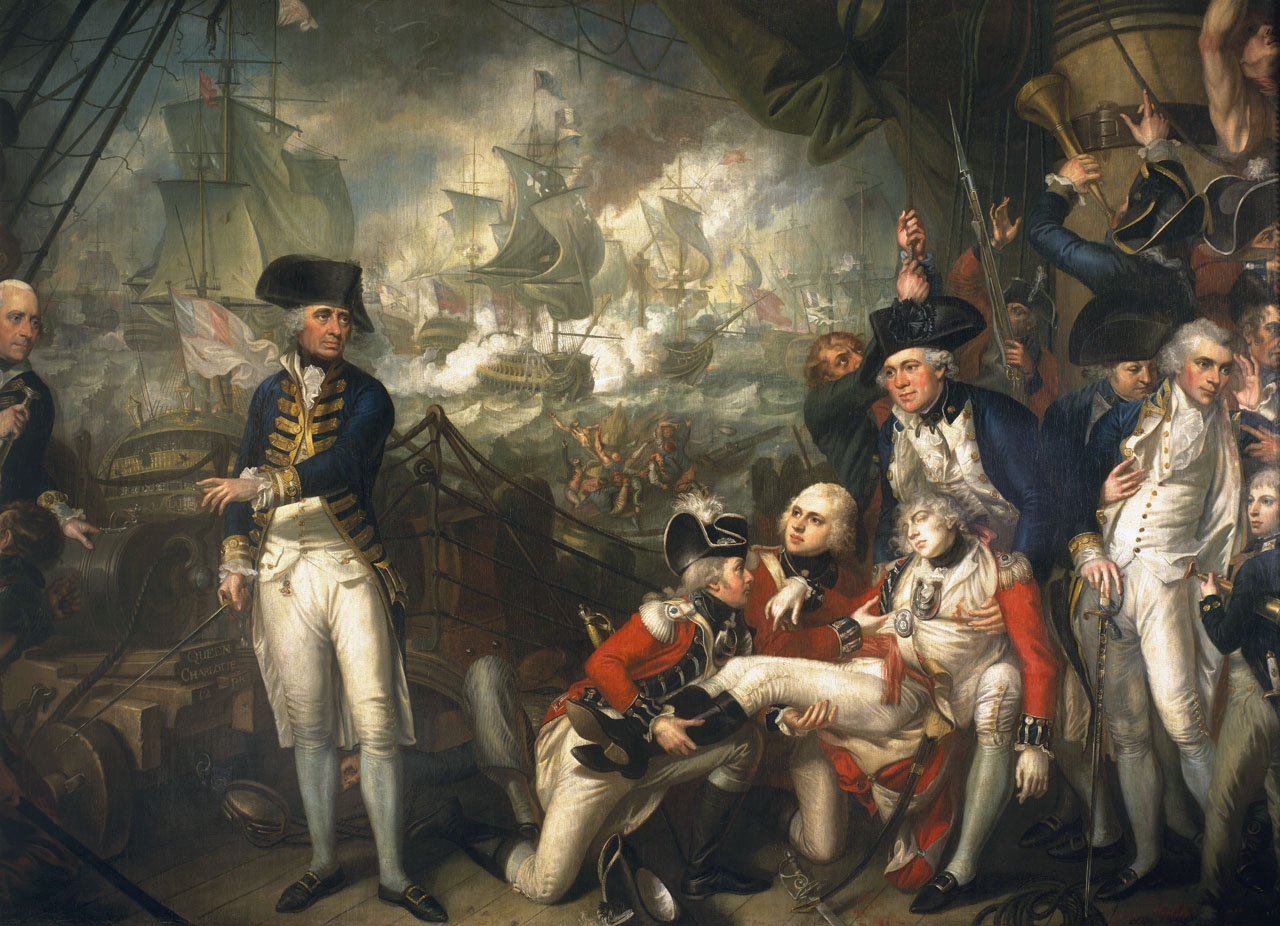
Lord Howe on the Deck of the Queen Charlotte, 1794

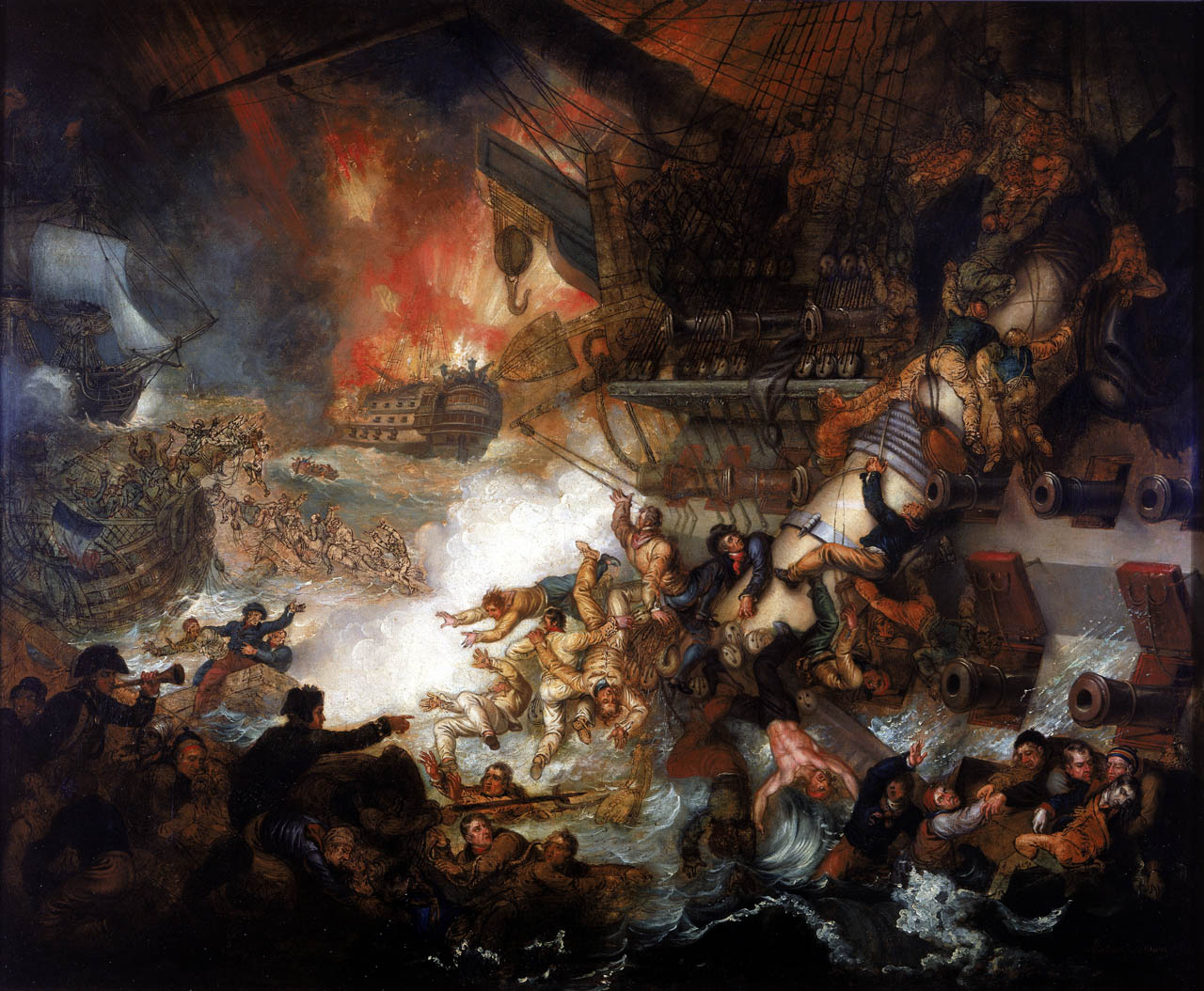
The Battle of the Nile, 1825

== Sources ==
- Evans, Dorinda, Mather Brown: Early American Artist in England. Middletown, CT: Wesleyan, 1982.
