= Portrait of John Adams (Copley) =

Painting by John Singleton Copley

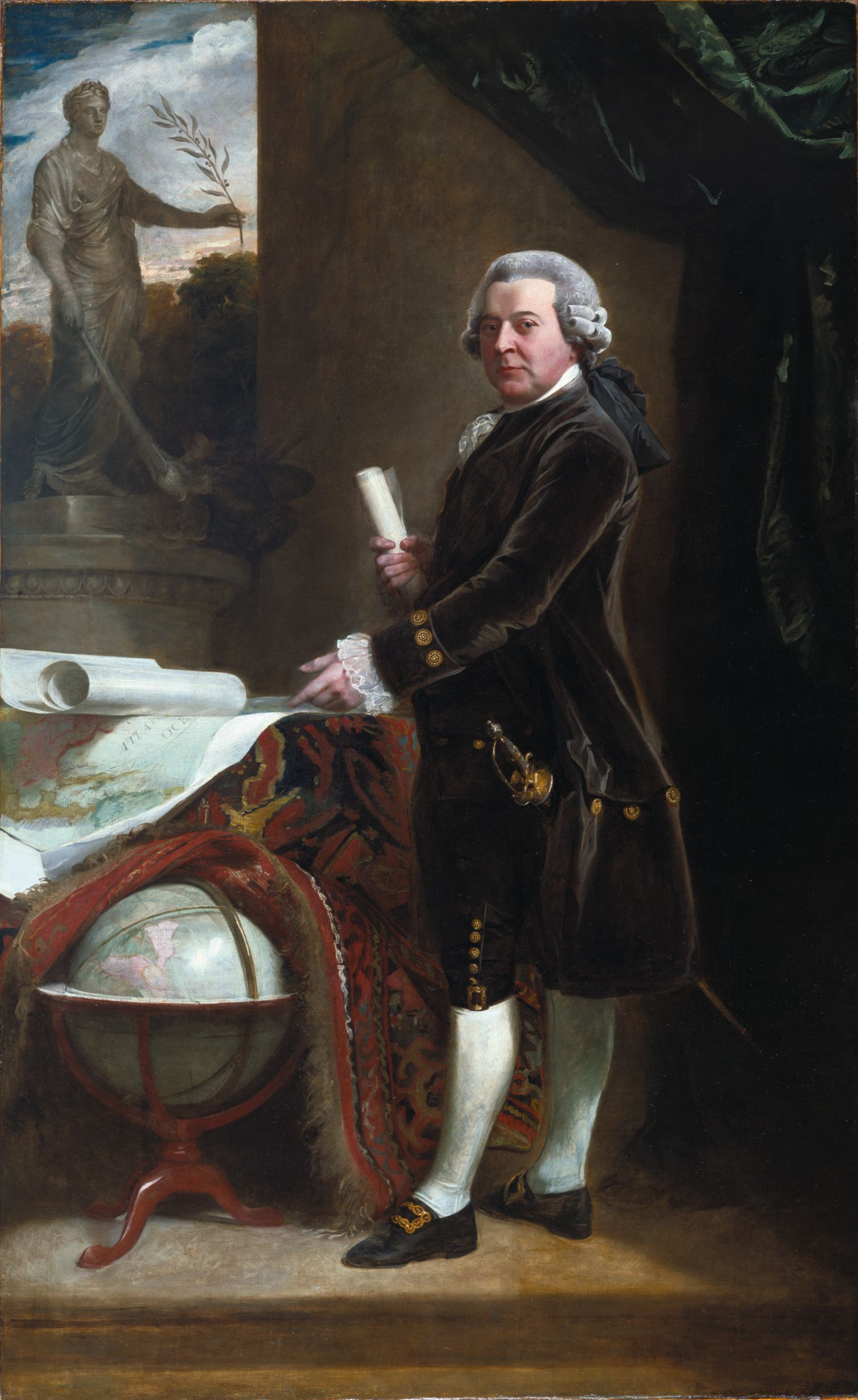
- Artist: John Singleton Copley
- Year: 1783
- Type: Oil on canvas, portrait painting
- Dimensions: 238.1 cm × 147 cm (93.7 in × 58 in)
- Location: Harvard Art Museums, Boston

Portrait of John Adams is a 1783 portrait painting by the Anglo-American artist John Singleton Copley. It depicts the American lawyer, politician and diplomat John Adams. It was painted in London while Adams was in the British capital. He had recently been one of the negotiators in the Peace of Paris that ended the American War of Independence. He is shown at full-length, pointing towards a map and a globe, both displaying the newly created United States.

Copley was a Boston-born artist who had moved to England and become a leading portraitist and history painter. He planned to display the painting at the Royal Academy at Somerset House that year, but its subject matter was deemed too controversial due to the recent conflict. It was eventually displayed at the Royal Academy Exhibition of 1796. Adams became the second President of the United States in 1797. The painting remained in Copley's studio until his death in 1815 and was then shipped to Massachusetts. While his wife Abigail praised it as "a very good likeness" her husband considered it "a piece of vanity". Today the painting is in the collection of Harvard Art Museums, having been donated by Ward Nicholas Boylston in 1828.

== Bibliography ==
- Kamensky, Jane. A Revolution in Color: The World of John Singleton Copley. W. W. Norton & Company, 2016.
- Kimberly, Orcutt, Theodore E. Stebbins, Virginia M. Genevie, Anderson. American Paintings at Harvard. Volume 1. Harvard Art Museums, 2008.
- Prown, Jules David. John Singleton Copley: In England, 1774-1815. National Gallery of Art, Washington, 1966.
