= Royal Academy Exhibition of 1797 =

1797 art exhibition in London

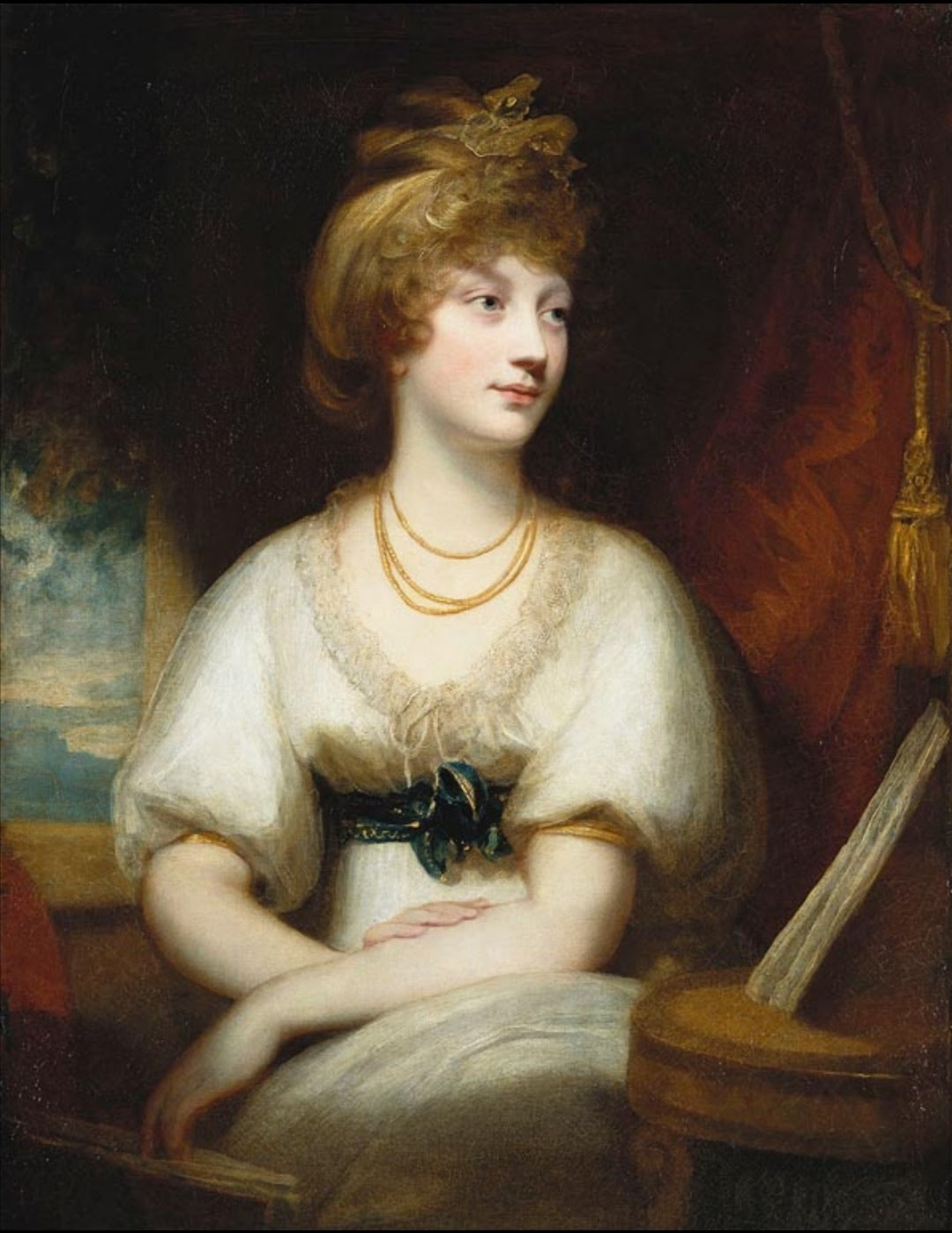
Portrait of Princess Amelia by William Beechey

The Royal Academy Exhibition of 1797 was an art exhibition held at Somerset House in London between 1 May and 17 June 1797. It was the twenty-ninth annual Summer Exhibition of the British Royal Academy of Arts. It was the largest exhibition to have been staged so far.

In portraiture William Beechey displayed his Portrait of Queen Charlotte, the wife of George III. In addition Beechey produced a portrait of the couple's youngest child Princess Amelia along with several of her sisters. While Thomas Lawrence had made his name by producing elegant, Romantic portraits he branched out this year by exhibiting a history painting Satan Summoning His Legions based on a passage in John Milton's Paradise Lost. It was not well-received by critics, although Lawrence himself felt the work was a success. In addition he submitted five portraits while his rival John Hoppner showed thirteen.

The President of the Royal Academy Benjamin West hung a joint portrait of his two sons. In addition his history painting Cicero Discovering the Tomb of Archimedes drew some criticism. The unusual colouring of this and other paintings by have been partly due to a scam "the Venetian secret" in which top painters were convinced that a seceret formula could show them to paint in the style of Titian and the Venetian School.

J.M.W. Turner exhibited a landscape Moonlight, a Study at Millbank as well as his now-lost Fishermen Coming Ashore at Sunset, Previous to a Gale (also known as the Mildmay Sea-Piece). John Opie displayed the historical scenes The Death of Archbishop Sharpe and The Coronation of Henry VI in Paris. Johan Zoffany, then nearing the end of his active career, showed a genre painting A Beggar's Family.

== Gallery ==
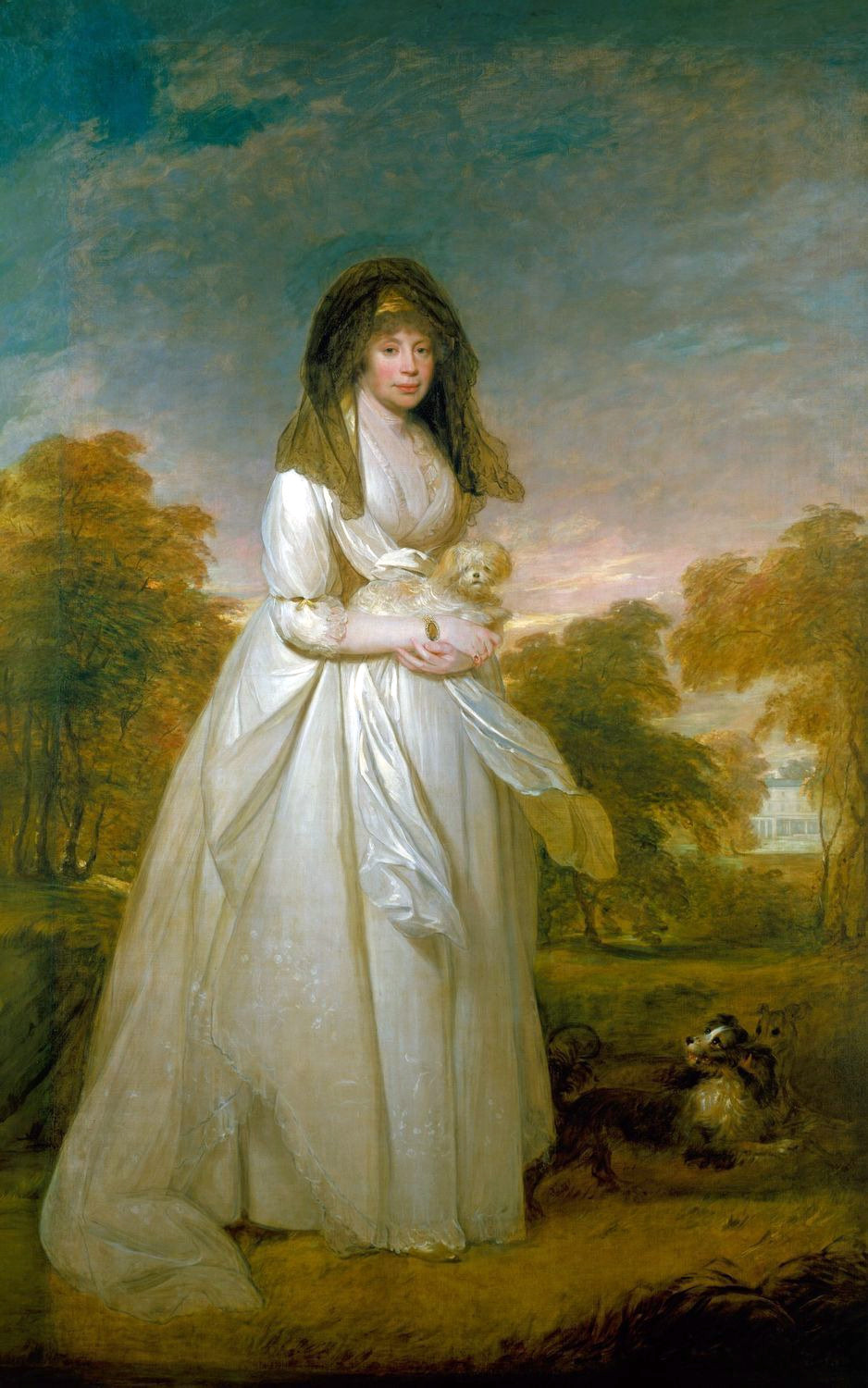
Portrait of Queen Charlotte by William Beechey

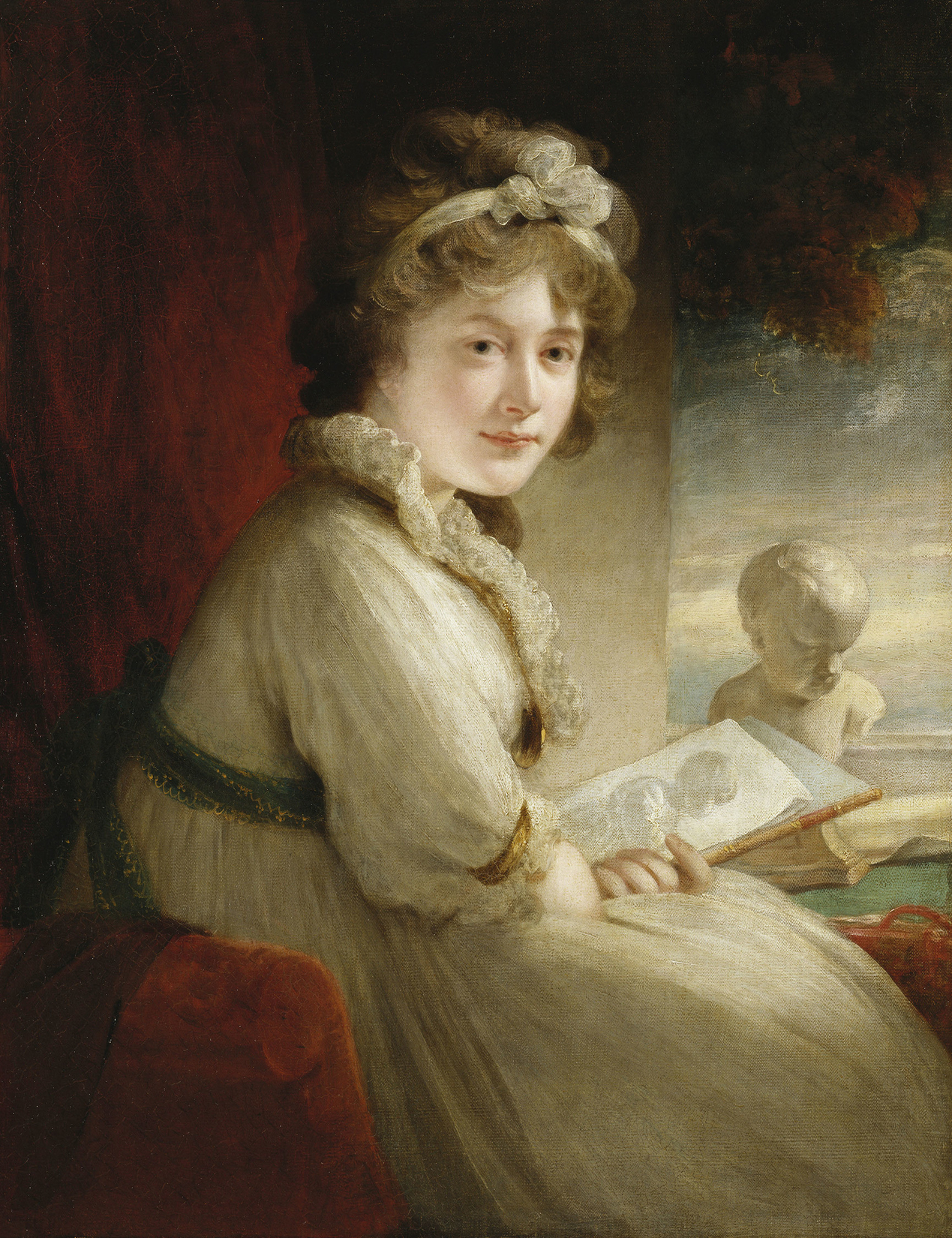
Princess Mary by William Beechey

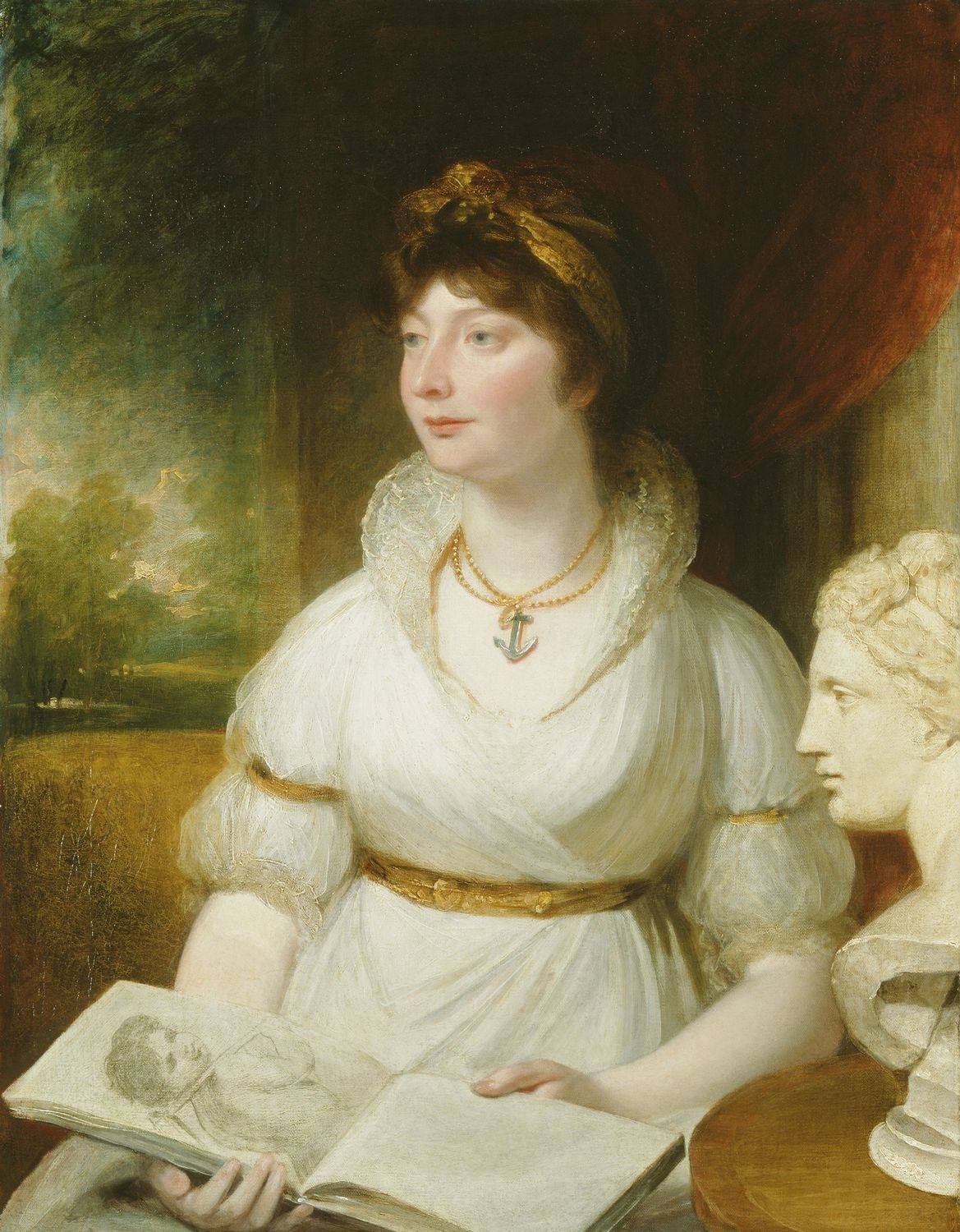
Princess Augusta by William Beechey

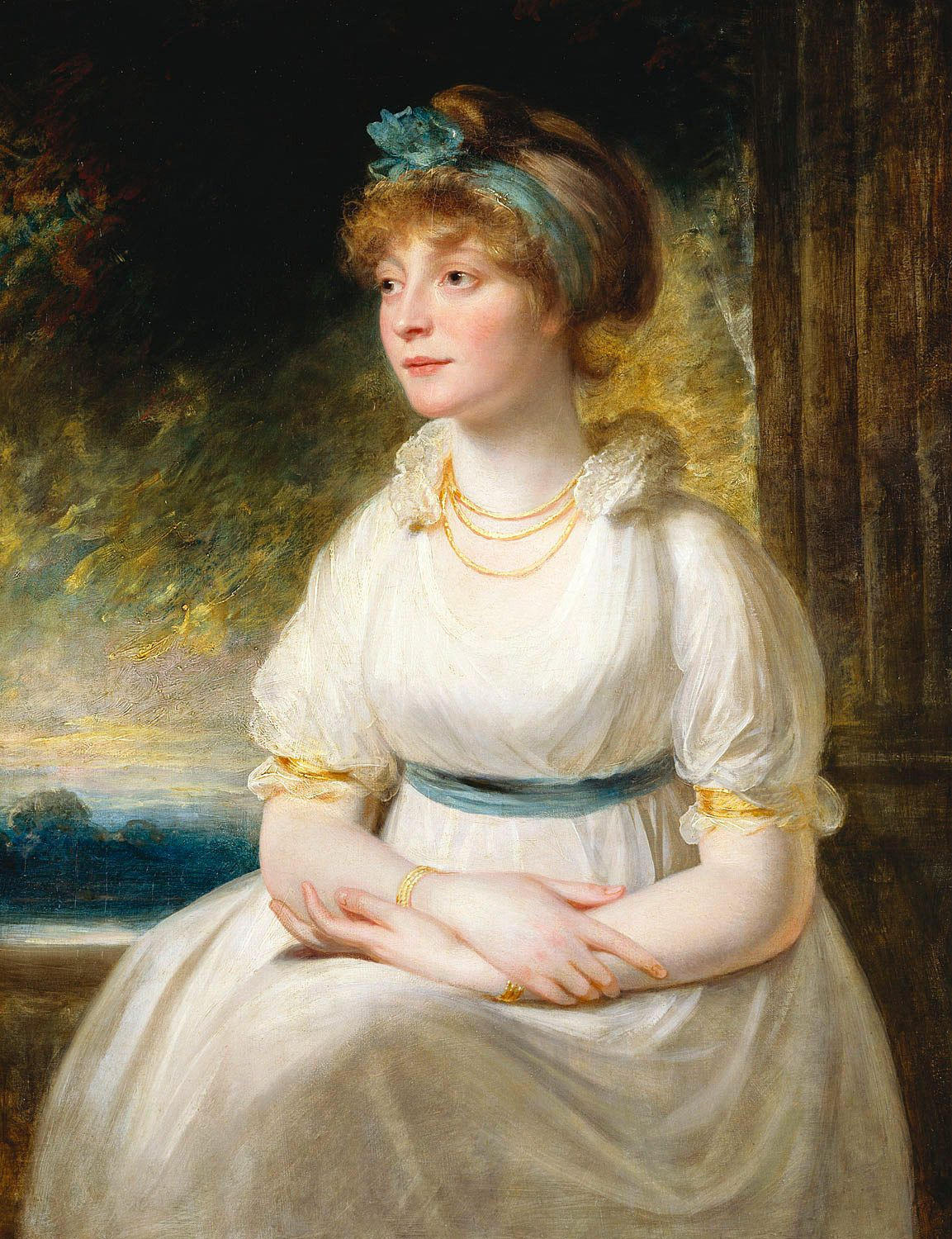
Princess Sophia by William Beechey

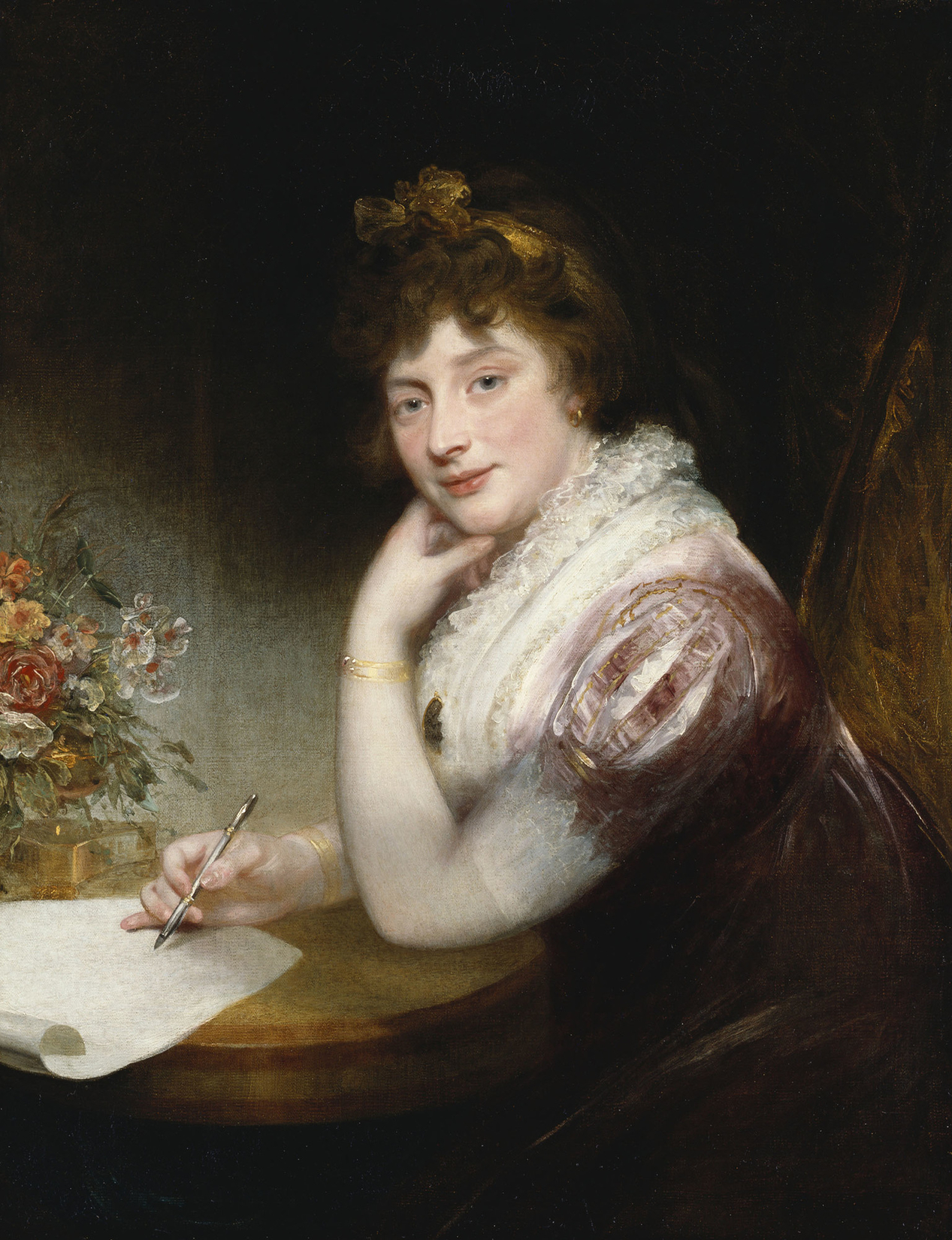
Princess Elizabeth by William Beechey

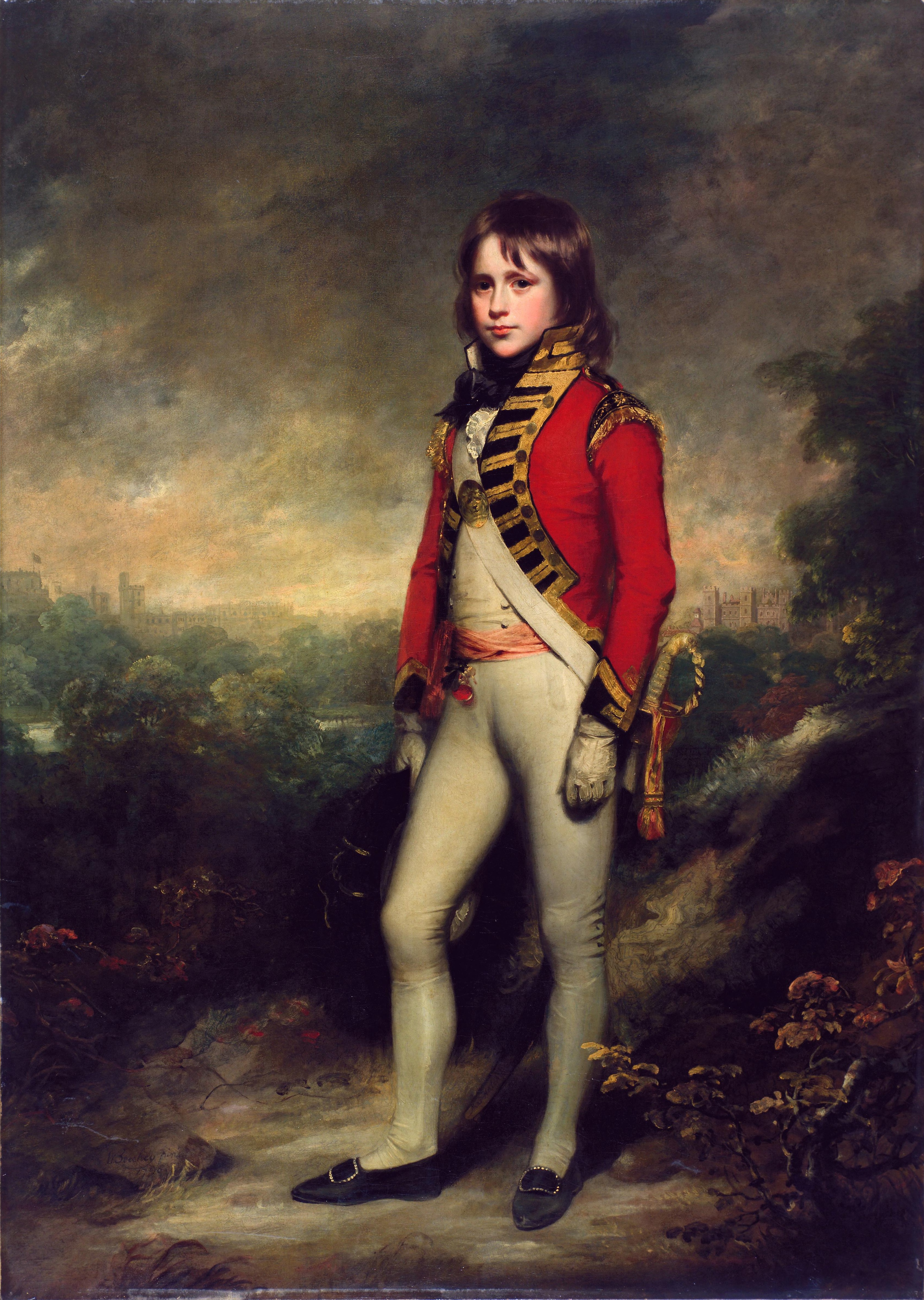
Master James Hatch by William Beechey

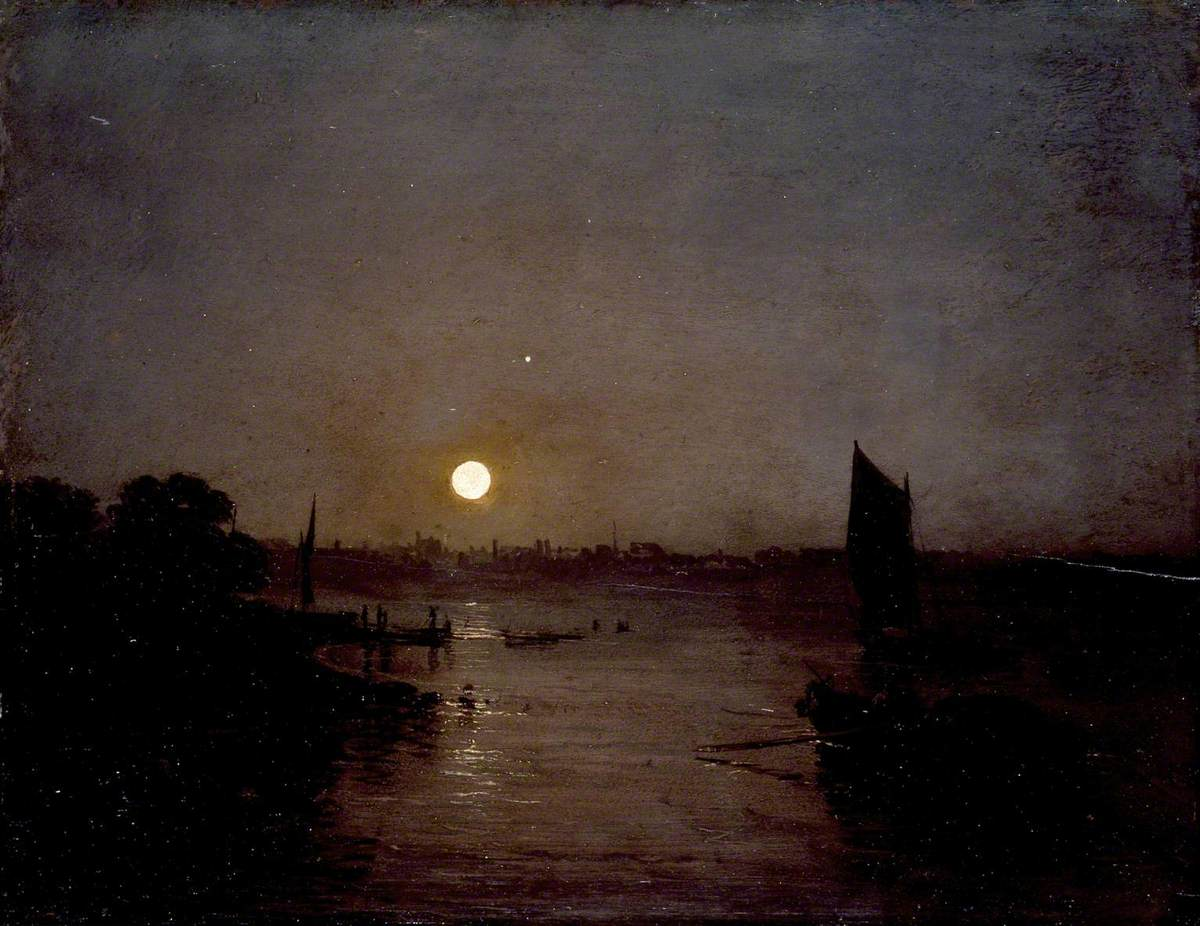
Moonlight, a Study at Millbank by J.M.W. Turner

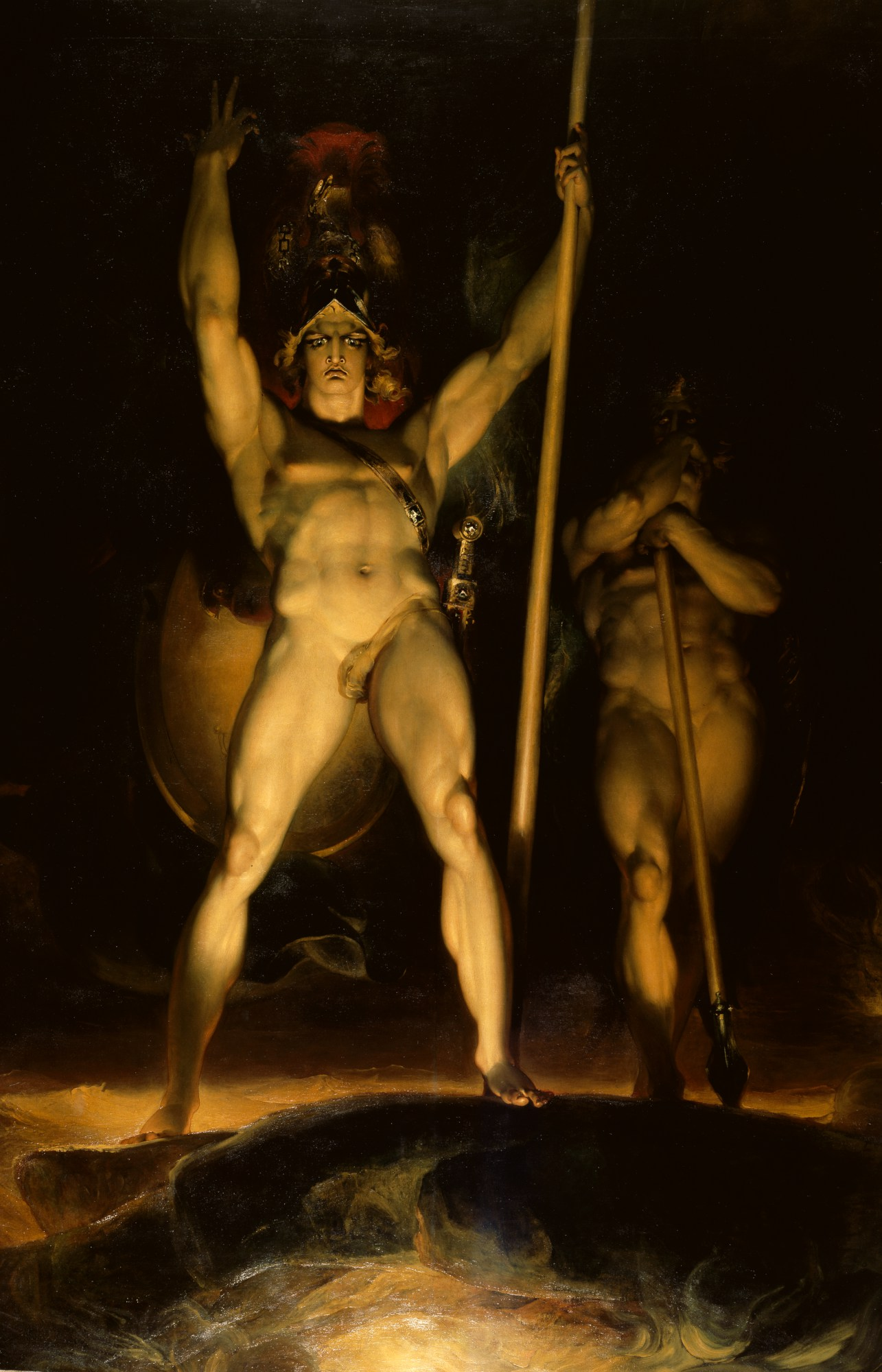
Satan Summoning His Legions by Thomas Lawrence

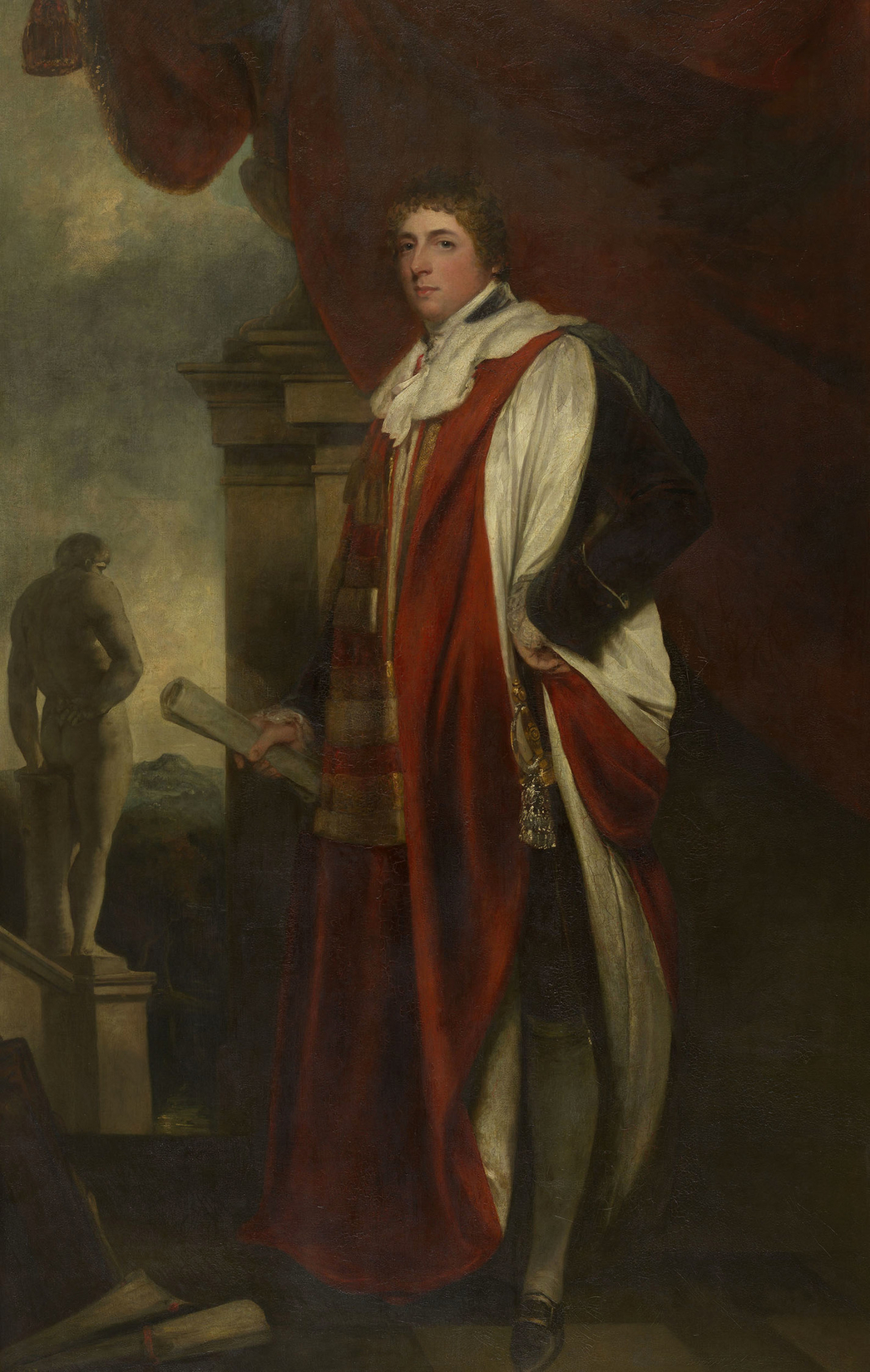
Duke of Bedford by John Hoppner

A Beggar's Family by Johan Zoffany

Raphael West and Benjamin West Jr by Benjamin West

A Drayman Drinking by Benjamin West

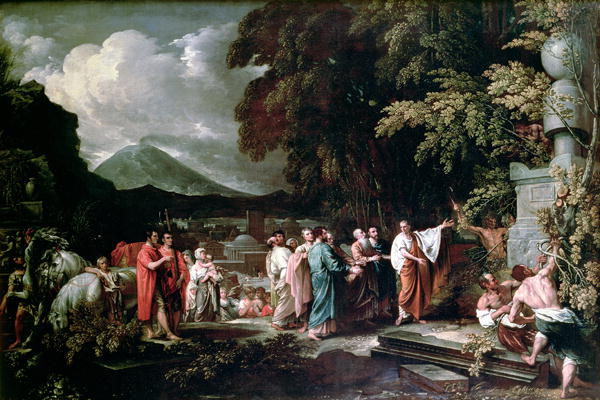
Cicero Discovering the Tomb of Archimedes by Benjamin West

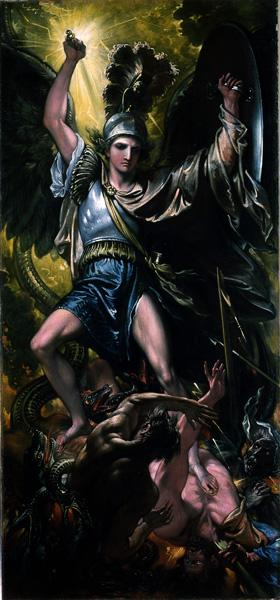
Saint Michael and the Dragon by Benjamin West

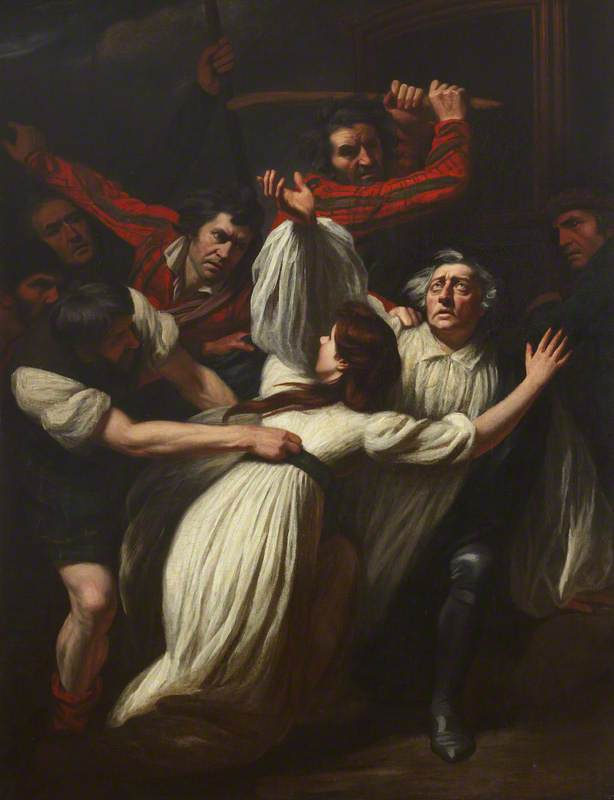
The Death of Archbishop Sharpe by John Opie

Courtship in the Park by John Opie

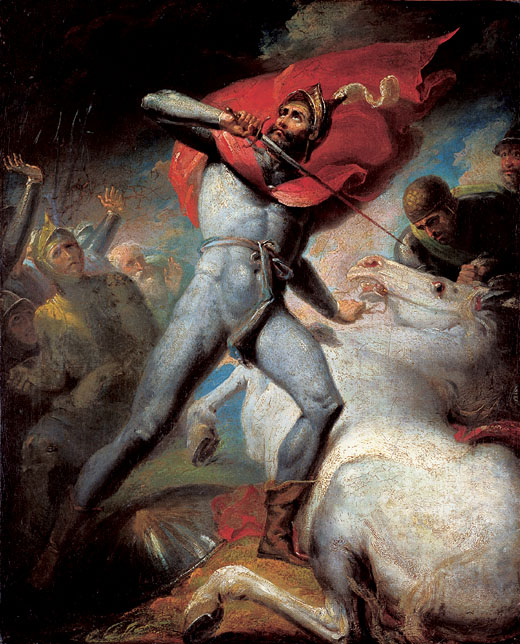
The Earl of Warwick's Vow by Henry Tresham

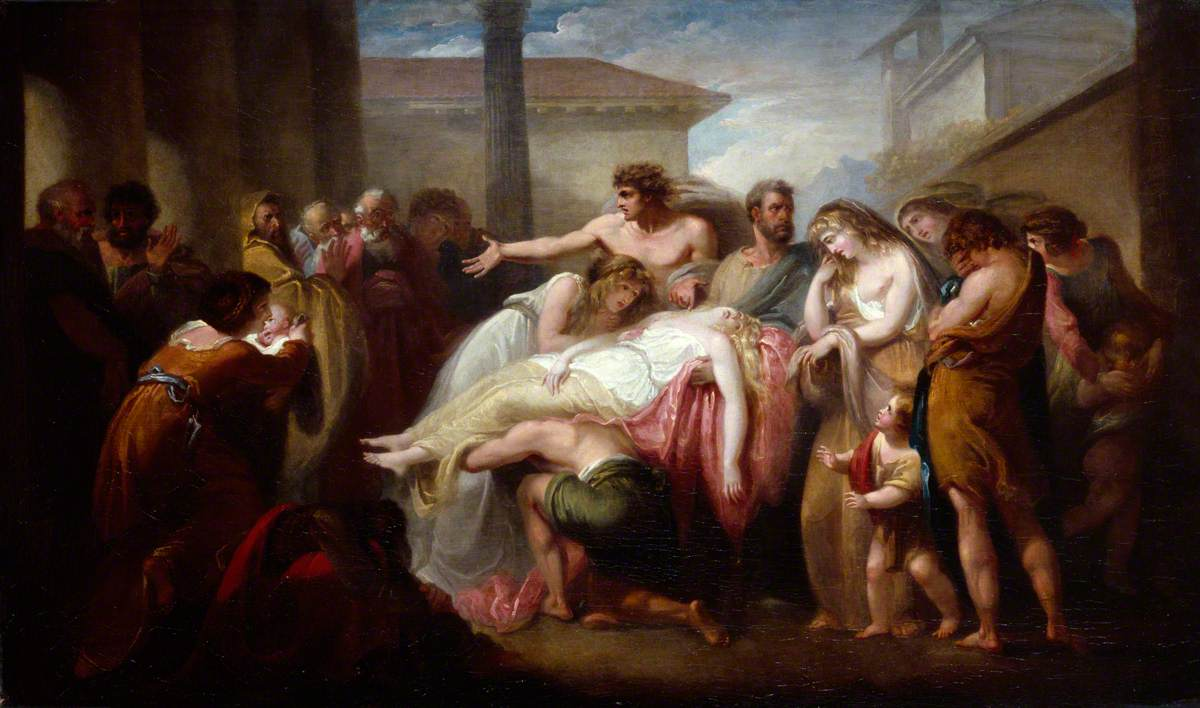
Death of Virginia by Henry Tresham

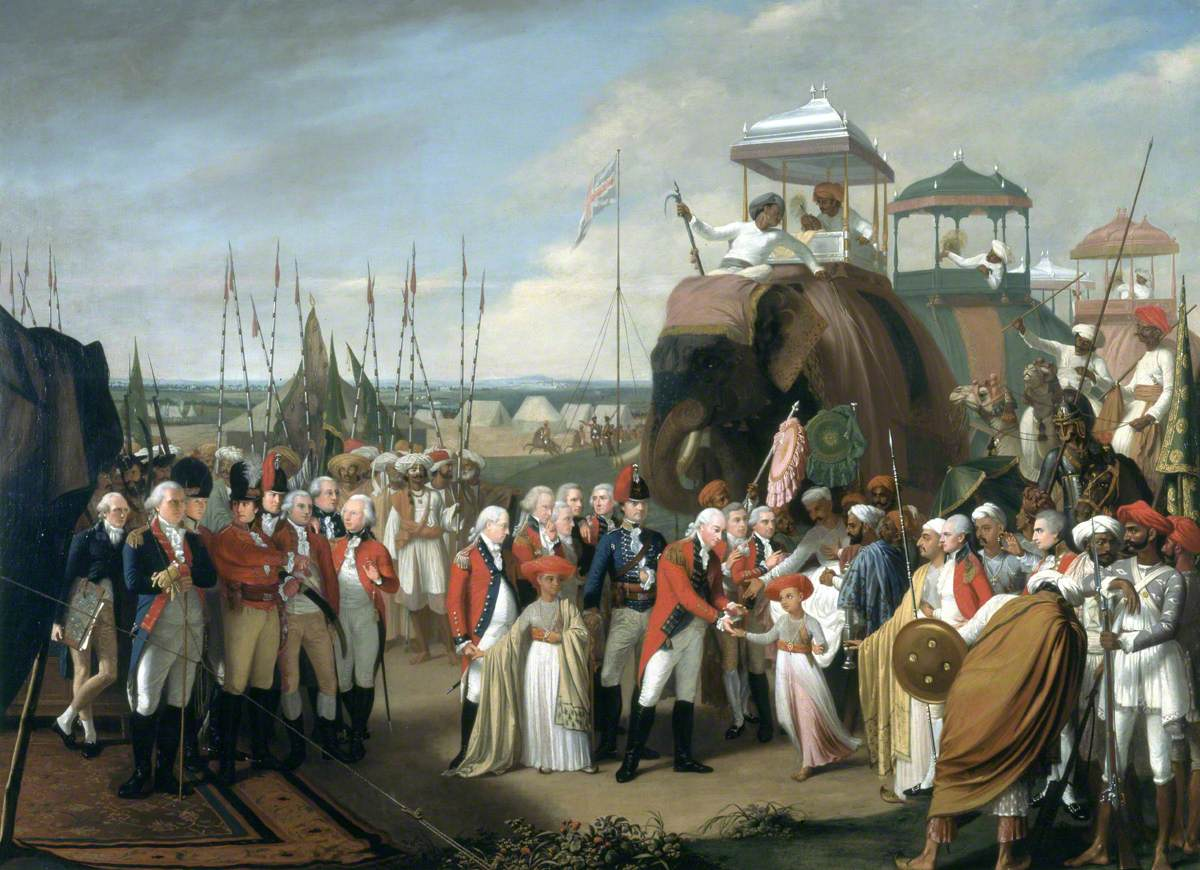
The Reception of the Mysorean Hostage Princes by Marquis Cornwallis by Robert Home

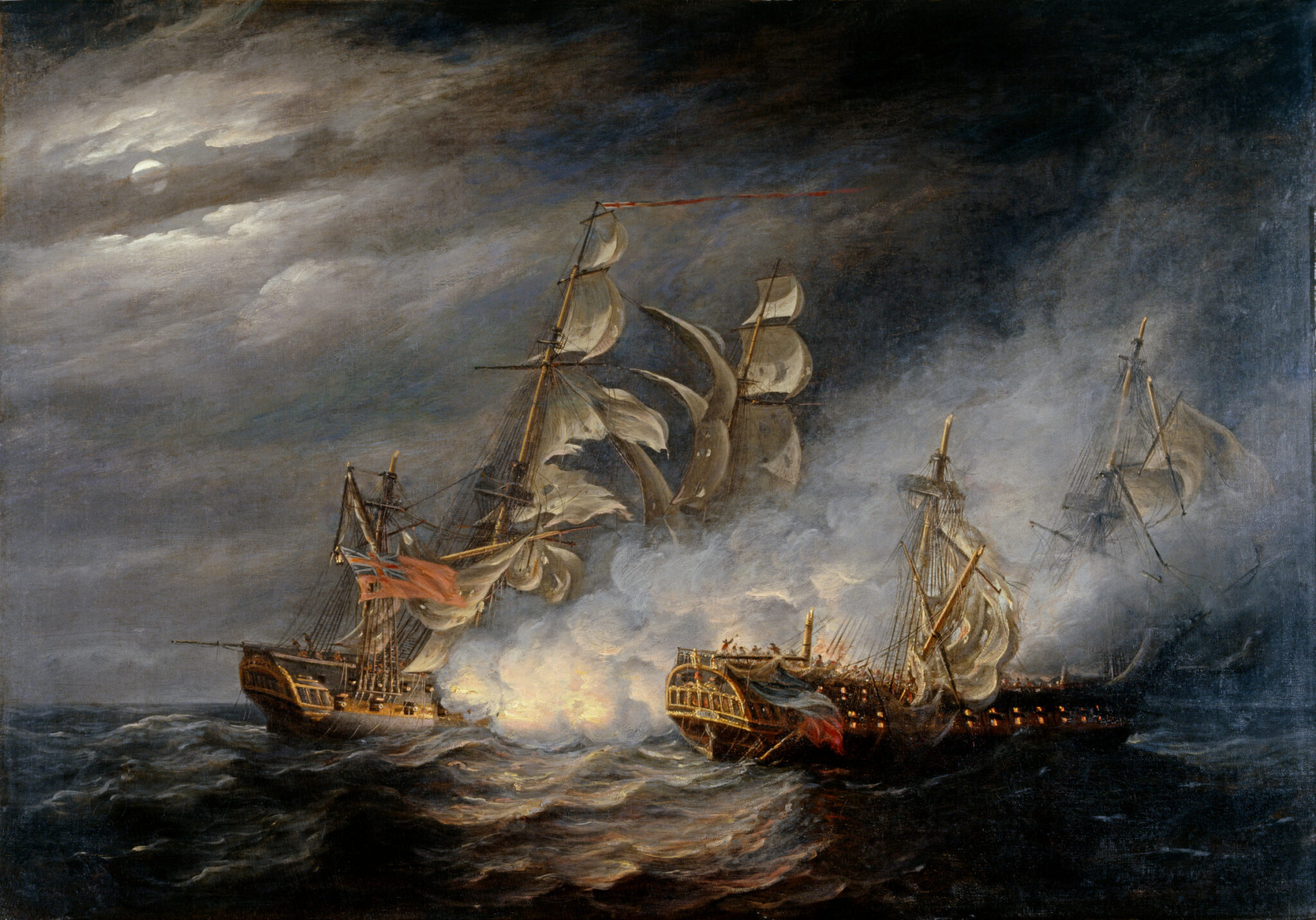
The Capture of La Virginie by HMS Indefatigable by Nicholas Pocock

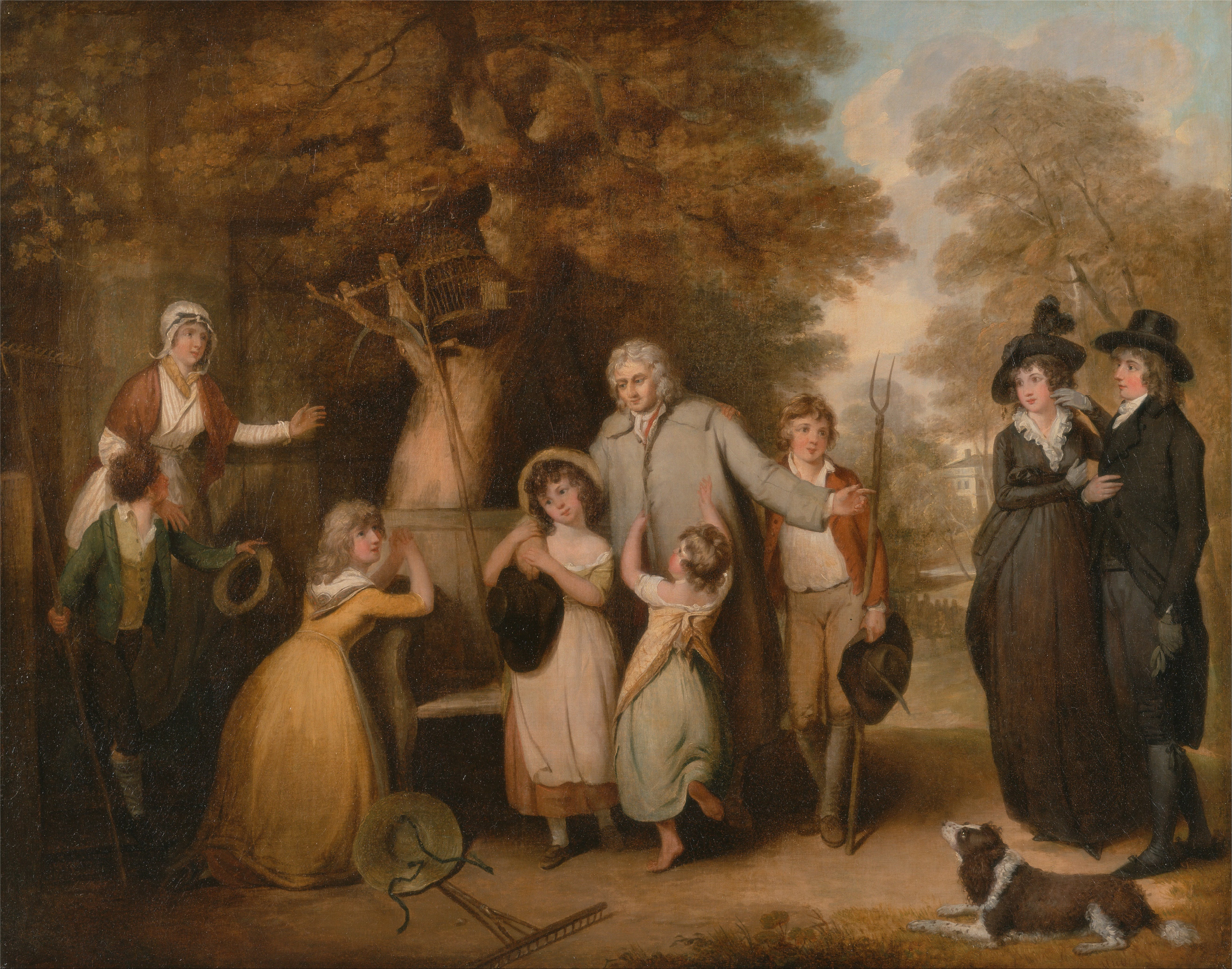
The Benevolent Heir by William Redmore Bigg

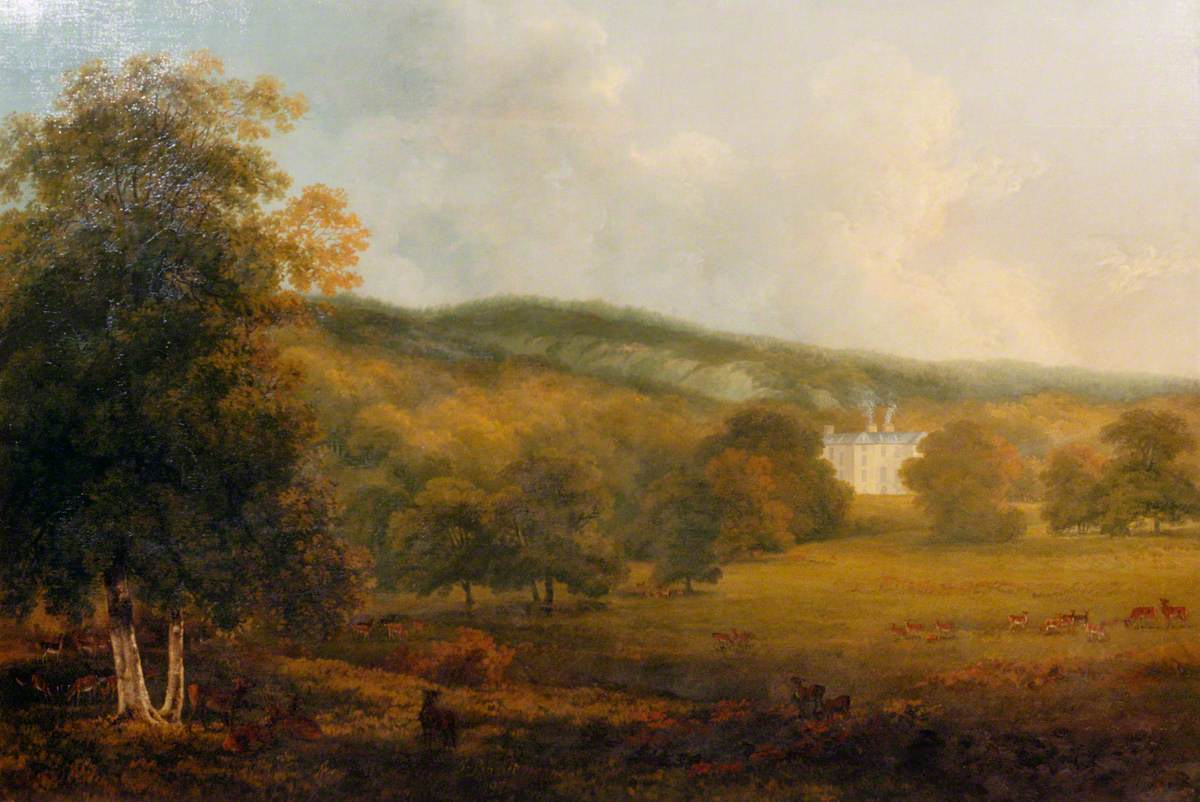
Castle Brahan, in the Highlands by James Barret

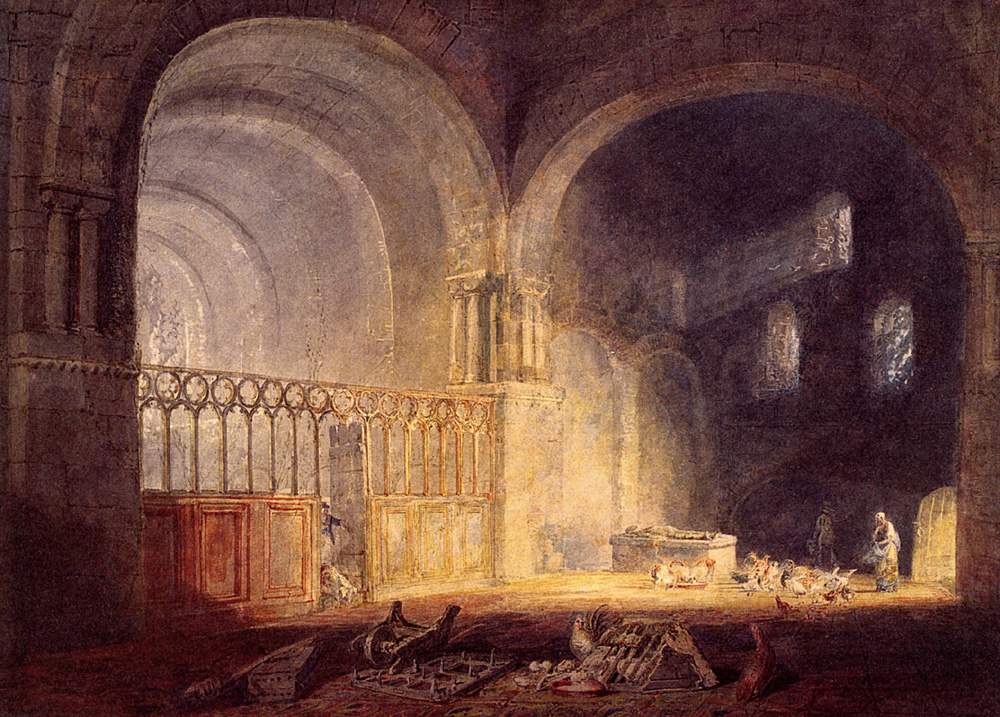
Transept of Ewenny Priory, Glamorganshire by J.M.W. Turner

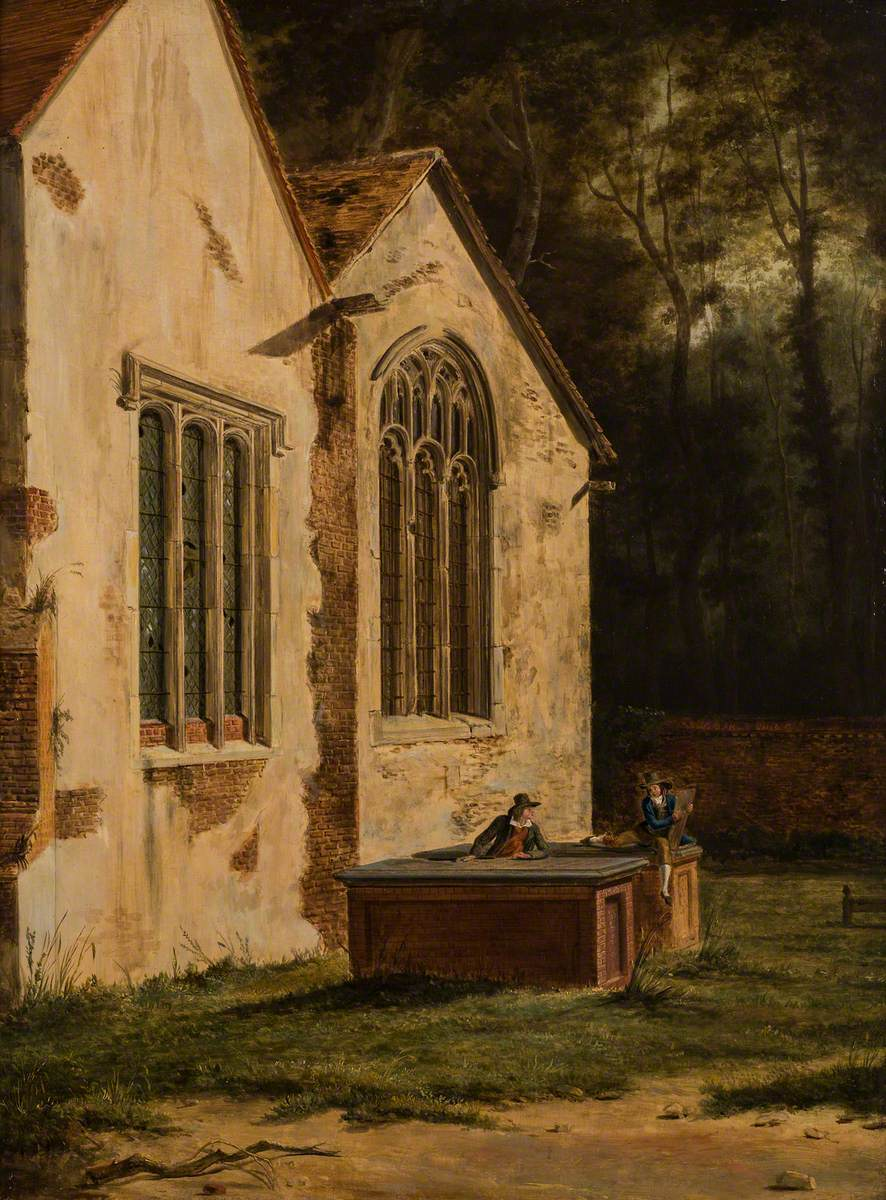
The Tomb of Gray by Hendrik Frans de Cort

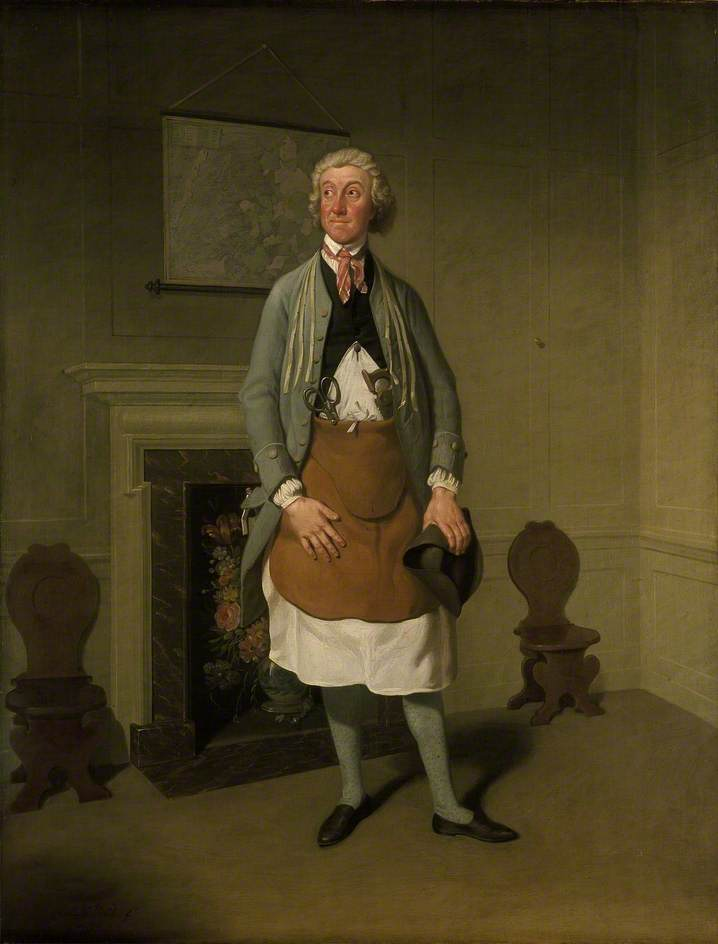
Richard Suett as Dicky Gossip by Samuel de Wilde

== See also ==
- Royal Academy Exhibition of 1796, the previous year's edition

== Bibliography ==
- Bailey, Anthony. J.M.W. Turner: Standing in the Sun. Tate Enterprises, 2013.
- Levey, Michael. Sir Thomas Lawrence. Yale University Press, 2005.
