= Kingmaker =

Person or group crucial in the transfer of power

Kingmaker is a term that usually refers to a person or group that has significant influence over who comes to power, but who is unable to take power directly. In the context of elective monarchy, the term is sometimes used to describe a member of the electoral college (like a prince-elector of the Holy Roman Empire).

The kingmaker concept is routinely applied to political entities in electoral systems to define a relatively weak group that can tip the balance of election by joining one of the stronger sides (for example, to the battleground or swing states of modern United States presidential elections).

== History ==
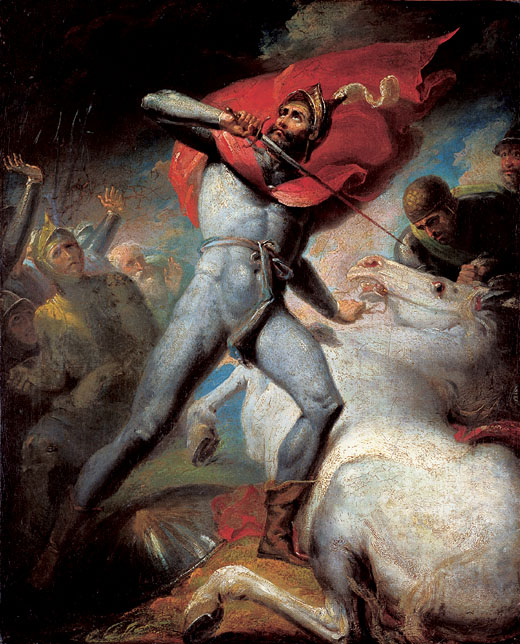
The Earl of Warwick's Vow by Henry Tresham. Warwick became known as the Kingmaker for his role during the Wars of the Roses

The term first entered English in the 15th century as a label for Richard Neville, 16th Earl of Warwick of the House of Neville (1428–1471). Largely through his manoeuvres during the Wars of the Roses (1455–1487), and by drawing on his wealth, his web of political connections, and his geopolitical positioning, he tipped the balance of power so as to install his chosen heirs upon the throne. He deposed Henry VI to clear the way for the ascension of Edward IV, then unseated Edward IV to restore Henry VI, before ultimately being killed in battle. Royal blood did run in Warwick's veins, yet his kinship to the ruling dynasty was distant enough that the throne itself lay beyond his reach; instead, he exerted a strong influence over the policies of England's kings. He was not the first to wield such power, but historians regard him as the foremost example in a long line of figures who stood close to the throne without ever occupying it (an eminence that earned him the epithet "Warwick the Kingmaker"). The events surrounding Richard Neville also gave rise to the board game Kingmaker, which reproduces the strategic alliances, betrayals, and power struggles of nobles contending for control of the monarchy during the Wars of the Roses.

Beyond European history, notable kingmakers populate the Chinese record. Amid the decline and fall of the Han dynasty, Cao Cao (155–220 AD) proved instrumental in the power struggles of the age. He never claimed the throne for himself, yet he amassed considerable power and turned it to positioning his son, Cao Pi, for the succession (a course that culminated in the founding of the state of Wei in 220 AD). A further such figure is Dorgon (1612–1650), a Manchu prince and regent of the early Qing Empire. Following the death of the dynasty's founder, Hong Taiji, it was Dorgon who supported the young Fulin in ascending as the Shunzhi Emperor. The notion of the kingmaker (zao wangzhe) has even been popularized in modern media (cf. the 2012 Hong Kong historical-fiction television drama King Maker, set in the Song dynasty).

In modern usage the sense of the term has shifted somewhat, and it is now frequently extended to political entities and to democratic systems. It is applied, on occasion, to politicians who voluntarily decline an office of influence: in 2004, for instance, Sonia Gandhi might have become Prime Minister of India after her party's electoral victory, yet chose not to. The label likewise attaches to figures powerful enough to help another politician into power, but unable or unwilling to sway that "king" thereafter. A conspicuous modern instance of kingmaking arose during the 2010 United Kingdom general election, which returned a hung parliament. With neither Gordon Brown's Labour Party nor David Cameron's Conservative Party able to secure a majority, the Liberal Democrat leader Nick Clegg found himself in a kingmaker's position. Clegg duly "crowned a king" by aligning his party with the Conservatives, thereby enabling David Cameron to take office as Prime Minister at the head of a coalition government.

== Electoral systems ==
When government body elections do not provide a clear majority for one of the competing parties, formation of a governing coalition sometimes provides conditions for a smaller party to acquire an oversized influence (become the kingmakers) by being able to swing between two competing blocks (cf. two-and-a-half party system). Makabongwe Khanyile, based on the examples of local elections in South Africa, argues that in this case the kingmakers "usurp power from voters to elect their representatives" and the resulting coalitions are weak and short-lived.

Presidential candidates in United States must gather votes from the Electoral College, so swing states such as Florida, Pennsylvania, and Ohio can prove decisive for the outcome, prompting both the Democratic and Republican parties to invest heavily in them and lending these states an outsized political weight.

== Kingmakers council ==
The term kingmakers council or college of kingmakers (sometimes referred to as traditional kingmakers) in modern research is mostly used to designate the bodies that elect local administration (like chieftains), primarily in the sub-Saharan Africa.

== International relations ==
Researchers of international relations (IR) use the term to describe a state that can tip the balance of power between competing great powers without being a great power itself. In Randall Schweller's Deadly Imbalances (1998), kingmaker is a third state that holds the balance in a tripolar system and "sells its services to the highest bidder", linking it to the Latin maxim cui adhaereo praeest (whichever side it joins gains the upper hand), a phrase associated with England being able to tip the European balance toward either France or the Holy Roman Empire in the times of Henry VIII.

Kai He, an IR researcher, described kingmaker in 2018 as a second-tier state able to support either an established hegemon's defense of the existing order or a rising power's challenge to it, while Michael Slobodchikoff and Aakriti Tandon characterized India as a kingmaker able to either bolster or contest the US-led order. Building on this, Cook et al. (2025) frame the dynamic as the power of the weak paradox: strategically located secondary states (which they call linchpins) lack the capacity to become great powers, yet can grant a decisive geostrategic advantage to whichever great power they align with. When applied to the China-US rivalry, Cook et al. identify Japan, South Korea, the Philippines and Vietnam as the principal Asia-Pacific linchpins able to act as kingmakers, each at a different stage of facing the resulting "kingmaker's conundrum". The concept has also been applied to regions rather than individual states. Lee et al. (2024) draw on complex interdependence and middle power theories, arguing that Southeast Asia, with its collective economic weight and its position astride major trade routes, holds latent kingmaker potential, but that the region's fragmented, with state-by-state hedging keeps the potential unrealized.

== See also ==
- Éminence grise
- Power behind the throne
- Shadow shogun

== Sources ==
- Atom, Victor Ntui (2023). "Chapter 4: Gender and Initiation Rites in Ejagham Land of Cameroon". In Falola, Toyin; Mbah, Emmanuel M. (eds.). Negotiating Identities in Contemporary Africa: Gender, Religion, and Ethno-Cultural Identities. Lexington Books. ISBN 978-1-6669-4448-8.
- BBC News (15 March 2010). "What is a 'kingmaker'?". Archived from the original on 18 August 2017.
- Cook, Richard J.; Ohle, Maximilian; Han, Zhaoying (2025). Asia-Pacific Secondary States as Kingmakers: Alignment Roles in the China-US Strategic Competition. London: Routledge. doi:10.4324/9781003512165. ISBN 978-1-032-84305-6.
- Duindam, Jeroen (2018). "Chapter 2: The Court as a Meeting Point: Cohesion, Competition, Control". Prince, Pen, and Sword: Eurasian Perspectives. pp. 32–128. doi:10.1163/9789004315716_003.
- Khanyile, Makabongwe (2019). "Does a 'kingmaker' usurp the electorate power? A South African perspective". Journal of Public Administration. 54 (2): 277–283.
- Lee, Brice Tseen Fu; Bettani, Salman Ali; Sims, Juan Pablo; Lee, Yun-Tso (2024). "Southeast Asia as a Latent Kingmaker in the US-China Rivalry" (PDF). Contemporary Chinese Political Economy and Strategic Relations. 9 (1): 57–99.
- Patton, David F. (Spring 2026). "Voting the Bums Out or Echoes of Weimar?: The FDP, Greens, AfD, Left Party, and BSW in the 2025 Bundestag Election" (PDF). German Politics and Society. 44 (1): 84–102. doi:10.3167/gps.2026.440105.
- Tibenderana, Peter Kazenga (1987). "The Role of the Brithish Administration in the Appointment of the Emirs of Northern Nigeria, 1901–1931: The Case of Sokoto Province". The Journal of African History. 28 (2): 231–257. doi:10.1017/s0021853700029765.
