= The Death of Archbishop Sharpe =

Painting by John Opie

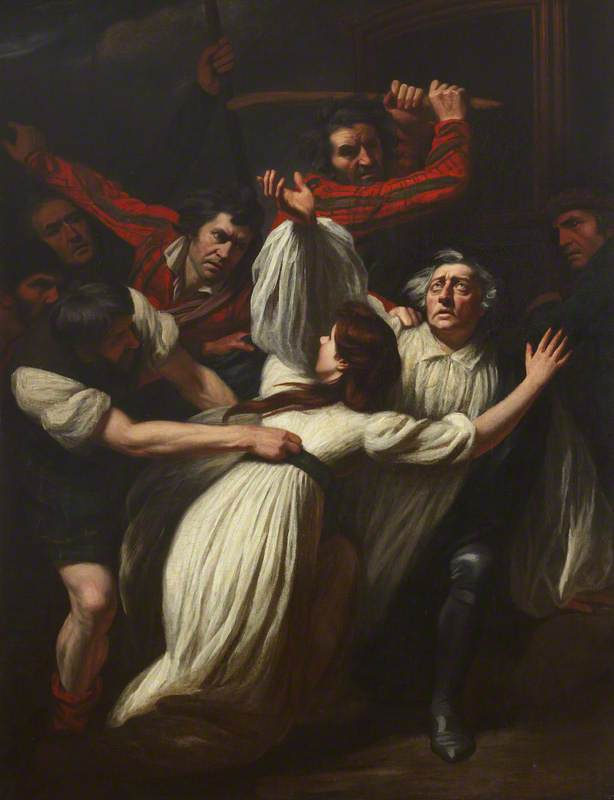
- Artist: John Opie
- Year: 1797
- Type: Oil on canvas, history painting
- Dimensions: 224.8 cm × 174 cm (88.5 in × 69 in)
- Location: Wardlaw Museum, St Andrews

The Death of Archbishop Sharpe is a 1797 history painting by the British artist John Opie. It depicts the murder of the Scottish bishop James Sharp at Magus Muir in Fife on 2 May 1679 during the Restoration era. His staunch advocacy of Episcopalianism brought him into conflict with the Covenanters, and a group of nine ambushed his coach and killed him. Much of the focus in the composition is taken up by Sharp's daughter who desperately tries to shield him from the blows.

The Cornish Opie was noted for his historical paintings as well as his portraits. He had produced several similar scenes from Scottish history including his now-lost 1786 painting The Assassination of James I and The Murder of Rizzio (1787). This painting was commissioned by Robert Bowyer for his Historic Gallery at Schomberg House in London's Pall Mall. It was displayed at the Royal Academy Exhibition of 1797 held at Somerset House in London. Today the picture is in the collection of the Wardlaw Museum at the University of St Andrews which acquired it in 2008.

== Bibliography ==
- Earland, Ada. John Opie and His Circle. Hutchinson & Company, 1911.
- Phillips, Mark. On Historical Distance. Yale University Press, 2013.
- Rawson, Helen. 600 Years in the Making: Highlights from the Museum Collections of the University of St Andrews. Bloomsbury Publishing, 2016.
- Tromans, Nicholas. David Wilkie: The People's Painter. Edinburgh University Press, 2007.
