= The History of England (Hume) =

Multi-volume historical work by David Hume

- Title page for The History of England (1826 edition)
- Author: David Hume
- Language: English
- Genre: History
- Published: 1754–1762
- Publication place: Great Britain
- Media type: Print: hardback
- Dewey Decimal: 942.0
- LC Class: DA30 .H9
- Text: The History of England at Wikisource

The History of England (1754–1761) is David Hume's great work on the history of England (also covering Wales, Scotland, and Ireland), which he wrote in installments while he was librarian to the Faculty of Advocates in Edinburgh. It was published in six volumes in 1754, 1757, 1759, and 1762. The first publication of his History was greeted with outrage by all political factions, but it became a best-seller, finally giving him the financial independence he had long sought. Hume's History spanned "from the invasion of Julius Caesar to the Revolution of 1688" and went through over 100 editions. Many considered it the standard history of England in its day.

== Publication history ==
Hume set out at first only to write a history of England under the Stuart monarchs James I and Charles I, which appeared in 1754. He followed this with a second history that continued to the Revolution of 1688. With the relative success of these two volumes, Hume researched the history of earlier eras and produced a total of six volumes. As a result, the fifth volume was the first to appear in print, in 1754, while the first two volumes were published last, in 1762. The complete History of England is arranged in chronological order, as follows:

- Vols. 1–2: The history of England from the invasion of Julius Caesar to the accession of Henry VII (i.e. 55 BC – AD 1485; first published in 1762)
- Vols. 3–4. The history of England under the House of Tudor (covering the years 1485–1601; published 1759)
- Vol. 5. The history of Great Britain, containing the reigns of James I and Charles I (covering the years 1601–1649; published 1754)
- Vol. 6. The history of Great Britain, containing the Commonwealth, and the reigns of Charles II and James II (covering the years 1649–1688; published 1757)

Because of the titles of the last two volumes, the whole work has occasionally been mistakenly referred to as History of Great Britain rather than History of England.

== Circumstances of the work's composition ==
The last Jacobite uprising of 1745 was a very recent memory, and had come close to turning the War of the Austrian Succession into a war of the British succession. This had come as a shock to Hume. So his main concern was to legitimise the Revolution of 1688, and forestall any future insurrection. He wanted his philosophy of government to appeal to both Whigs and former Jacobites. Perhaps this can be best understood in his 1748 essay "Of the Original Contract". He was not an adherent of any party.

In England, anti-Scottish prejudice was running high. Hume was a master of the internalised Scoticism, and even wrote a booklet about how to do it. The History of England is a classic of the genre. It helps understand Hume to re-externalise the milieu that he flourished in.

== The Revolution of 1688 ==
He wrote of the Revolution:

By deciding many important questions in favour of liberty, and still more, by that great precedent of deposing one king, and establishing a new family, it gave such an ascendent to popular principles, as has put the nature of the English Constitution beyond all controversy.

Thus Hume is at odds with those who argue that the British Constitution is entirely evolutionary, and did not emerge from a revolution, just like the later American and French Constitutions, and the earlier Dutch Constitution.

The source of this antinomian interpretation of British freedom can be traced in Hume's account of the revolutionary debates themselves. William of Orange had been invited to invade by a coalition of English Whigs and Tories. To placate the latter's maxim that "the throne was never vacant", or in modern parlance the monarch never dies, the fiction was agreed that King James would be said to have abdicated. It fell to the Scottish Parliamentary Convention, meeting a month after the English one: "in a bold and decisive vote", to declare "that king James, by his maladministration, and his abuse of power, had forfeited all title to the crown". Hume wanted to present the UK as having a modern constitution. He did not see it as something that stretched back seamlessly to Magna Carta or the laws of King Alfred.

The narrative ends with a parliamentary convention annexing to the settlement

a declaration of rights, where all the points, which had, of late years, been disputed between king and people, were finally determined; and the powers of the royal prerogative were more narrowly circumscribed and more exactly defined, than in any former period of the English government.

In fact Britain has two declarations of right from this period. The Bill of Rights is (or was) the basic law of England, the Claim of Right that for Scotland.

There are important differences between these little studied declarations. Where the Bill of Rights states that the King cannot make laws without the consent of Parliament, the Claim of Right says that all assertions of a right to rule above the law are themselves against the law. The Bill of Rights was inspired by John Locke. Behind the Claim of Right can be detected the guiding hand of James Dalrymple, 1st Viscount of Stair 1619–1695. Hume studied law as a student at Edinburgh. He implies that he neglected this study. This must be taken with a pinch of salt. He may have wanted to avoid giving the lay reader the impression that he had written a history just for lawyers like William Blackstone. What is certain is that he names two of the founders of Roman Dutch law, Johannes Voet and Arnold Vinnius, in the same breath as Cicero and Virgil. Cicero was, of course, a lawyer. The standard work for a Scottish law student to study was, then as now, "Stair's Institutions of the laws of Scotland".

Hume names neither of the unamended constitutions of 1689. He wanted a new constitution for the United Kingdom to flesh out these outline declarations. He set out his proposals in the essay Idea of a Perfect Commonwealth, which is a reworking of The Commonwealth of Oceana by the 17th-century visionary James Harrington. Leaving the extent of the Commonwealth and the location of its capital undecided, Hume's highly devolved scheme was "to have all the advantages both of a great and a little Commonwealth". In some ways it resembles the model of Presbyterian church government. Hume was no theorist of an unwritten constitution.

== Narrative ==
The work can perhaps be best discussed as four separate histories in the order in which he wrote them.

=== The History of Great Britain Part 1 ===
The book begins auspiciously with James VI of Scotland peacefully assuming the title of first King of Great Britain. He immediately began a series of attempts to promote a Union between his two kingdoms, and found for this a staunch ally in Francis Bacon. These came to nothing, curiously more because of opposition in the English Parliament than in the Scottish one. On the whole, Hume portrays this complex king, who had grown up with the same predicament as Orestes, as a beneficent ruler keeping Britain at peace, notably by staying out of the Thirty Years' War.

However an epic of unintended consequences was unravelling. As the King was dying, his son's wooing of the Spanish Infanta turned into a jilting, and the two countries drifted into a war, spurred on by Protestant extremists in the House of Commons. Charles I's attempt following the Petition of Right (1628) to rule without a Parliament in England collapsed after he provoked the revolution of the National Covenant in Scotland (1638). Irish Catholics led by Felim O'Neill seized the opportunity to rebel (1641). Civil War broke out in England. The king was defeated, tried, and executed (1649). Thus Hume's first volume ends at the start of England's short-lived experiment with republicanism.

Of the book's reception, Hume wrote:

I was assailed by one cry of reproach, disapprobation, and even detestation; English, Scotch, and Irish, Whig and Tory, churchman and sectary, freethinker and religionist, patriot and courtier, united in their rage against the man, who had presumed to shed a generous tear for the fate of Charles I, and the Earl of Strafford.

=== The History of Great Britain Part 2 ===
Hume continues the story with an account of: the leveller experiment with communism; of the Scottish Parliament's proclamation of Charles II as king; of Cromwell's genocidal suppression of the Irish revolt; of his near nemesis at the Battle of Dunbar; of the crowning of Charles II at Scone; of Cromwell's final destruction of the now royalist Covenanter army at the Battle of Worcester; and of his subsequent annexation of Scotland.

After Cromwell's death, his son Richard Cromwell, "Tumbledown Dick", could not keep the republic together; and General Monck brought the army of occupation in Scotland south to effect the Restoration. This was followed by the execution of the remaining regicides:

... a mind, seasoned with humanity, will find a plentiful source of compassion and indulgence ... No saint or confessor ever went to martyrdom with more assured confidence of heaven than was expressed by those criminals, even when the terrors of immediate death, joined to many indignities, were set before them.

They were hanged drawn and quartered. Four (already dead) were disinterred and subject to Posthumous execution. Of this volume, Hume wrote:

In 1756, two years after the fall of the first volume, was published the second volume of my History, containing the period from the death of Charles I. till the Revolution. This performance happened to give less displeasure to the Whigs, and was better received. It not only rose itself, but helped to buoy up its unfortunate brother.

=== The History of the House of Tudor ===
This history, written during the Seven Years' War, starts (Vol. 3) with the final overthrow and extinction of the old Plantagenet royal family by the Anglo-Welsh Henry Tudor; and his success in gaining acceptance for what was a weak hereditary claim. Robert Adamson tells us that this was the point where Adam Smith wanted Hume to begin the history. There follows the reign of Henry VIII, and his break with Rome; the English Reformation under his ill-starred son Edward VI; and the attempt at counter-reformation by his daughter "bloody" Mary I.

Vol. 4 continues with the reign of Queen Elizabeth. Hume wrote:

In 1759, I published my History of the House of Tudor. The clamour against this performance was almost equal to that against the History of the two first Stuarts. The reign of Elizabeth was particularly obnoxious.

Hume's portrayal of Elizabeth is hardly flattering. However, there was another reason for the outrage. Hume, along with Dr. William Robertson, had been examining the papers relative to Mary, Queen of Scots. Both historians found that Queen Mary had indeed been complicit in the murder of her husband Darnley, thus exonerating what the Scottish Parliament had said when they deposed her. There have been copious attempts to refute Hume and Robertson on this.

=== The Early History of England ===
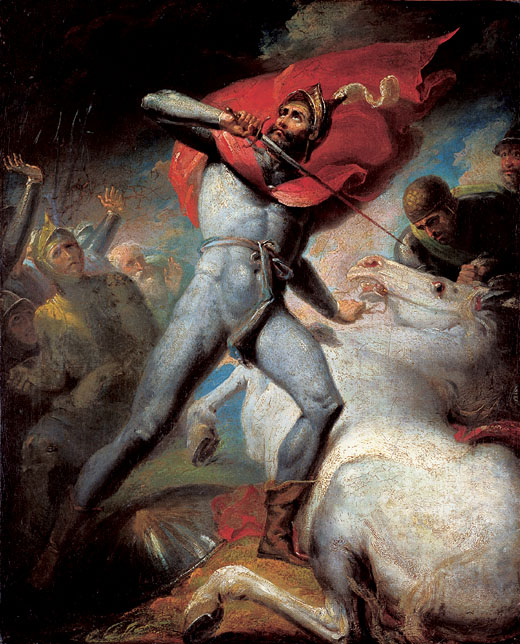
The Earl of Warwick's Vow by Henry Tresham, 1795

Vol 2 covers the period following the establishment of Magna Carta, through to the auto-destruction of the Plantagenet dynasty in the Wars of the Roses. This could be described as the time when the English Nation was reinvented, after two centuries of Franco-Norman subjugation.

Volume 1 takes the story back to the foundation of the first English kingdoms, the heptarchy: Kent, Northumberland, East Anglia, Mercia, Essex, Sussex, and Wessex; and to the Romano-Welsh imperium these kingdoms supplanted.

== The work as constitutional history ==
Hume wrote several appendices and discursions, which may be classed in their apparent order of composition, covering: 1) the Shakespearean period; 2) the period up until the restoration; 3) the period ending with the Revolution; 4) the period of the Tudors; 5) the Anglo-Saxon period; 6) the period up until the signing and gradual implementation of Magna Carta; 7) the era of Edward III; and 8) the period ending with the overthrow of Richard Plantagenet. This last discursion at the end of vol 2 is a summary of some of Hume's most developed thoughts (chapter XXII).

An anti-Jacobite shibboleth that Hume wanted to refute held that absolute monarchy was an innovation brought to England by James I. When James was writing his Basilicon Doron expounding the divine right of kings, he was king of Scotland alone. He wanted to bring the authoritarian English model of kingship to his unruly northern kingdom. When he came to England, he inherited the oppressive Court of High Commission and the Court of the Star Chamber from the Tudors. He did not increase their powers. On the contrary, Hume found the rule of the first two Stuarts to have been milder than that of Elizabeth. The revolutionary ferment was not caused by any novel oppression.

However Hume did acknowledge that the divine right, or patriarchal, system of government itself had a historical origin. This he dates to the time of the first two Tudors: Henry VII and Henry VIII. Before that date: "a kind of Polish Aristocracy prevailed ...". In Humes's time the Polish aristocracy elected their king. This just predates the long period of the Partitions of Poland between the Hohenzollern, Habsburg, and Romanov autocracies.

It was possible to agree at that time with Montesquieu that the Polish Szlachta, or aristocracy, had remained as a bulwark against autocracy, which had been lost by aristocrats like himself through the centralisation of Bourbon power in France. Very recent history was the abolition of heritable jurisdictions. Before that law was passed, local aristocrats in Scotland had the power to try cases and raise armies, as the Government had just learnt to its cost. Far from exporting divine right principles to England: Scotland, like Poland, had never become a centralised Renaissance monarchy.

Similarly, in England before the Tudors,

... though the kings were limited, the people were as yet far from being free. It required the authority almost absolute of the sovereigns, which took place in the subsequent period, to pull down those disorderly and licentious tyrants, who were equally averse from peace and from freedom, and to establish that regular execution of the laws, which, in a following age, enabled the people to erect a regular and equitable plan of liberty.

A heritable jurisdiction might be conducted with equity, if presided over by someone like Montesquieu; but there is even less guarantee than there is in the judiciary of an autocracy.

The convention that the kings could not raise taxes without parliamentary consent, Hume dates to the time of the usurpers of the House of Lancaster, who needed to bolster their shaky claim to the throne with warlord support. The reluctance of the House of Commons to fund the executive, led the otherwise absolutist Tudors to grant monopolies, force loans, and raise funds by other irregular measures. These practices came to a head under the Stuarts, but they did not initiate them.

This earlier era of Polish style aristocracy came about through the gradual implementation of Magna Carta; before which the kings had been more absolute, ruling by right of conquest. The early Normans in turn had subjugated the Saxons, among whom "the balance seems to have inclined [again] to the side of aristocracy" or oligarchy.

He allows that the early Saxons and other Germans

seem to have admitted a considerable mixture of democracy into their form of government, and to have been one of the freest nations, of which there remains any account in the records of history;

but he cautions:

Those who, from a pretended respect to antiquity, appeal at every turn to an original plan of the constitution, only cover their turbulent spirit and their private ambition under the appearance of venerable forms.

Under the Saxons, there was never much freedom for the Ancient Britons.

He saw in the patriarchy of the Tudors and Stuarts "the dawn of civility and sciences". It was also the time of the terminal decline of serfdom, free men having become of greater commercial value.

== A history of political economy in England ==
Hume's fundamental theorem, quoted by Adamson, is that:

everything in the world is purchased by labour, and our passions are the only causes of labour.

His position is very close here to Adam Smith. The work contains several discursions on the fluctuations in the price of corn and other commodities through the eras.

== The Crusades as the nadir of western civilisation ==
The rise, progress, perfection, and decline of art and science, are curious objects of contemplation, and intimately connected with a narration of civil transactions. The events of no particular period can be fully accounted for, but by considering the degrees of advancement, which men have reached in those particulars.

Ever a classicist, he saw the age of Augustus as a high point in civilisation, after which there had been an inexorable decline:

But there is a point of depression, as well as of exaltation, from which human affairs naturally return in a contrary direction, and beyond which they seldom pass either in their advancement or decline. The period, in which the people of Christendom were the lowest sunk in ignorance, and consequently in disorders of every kind, may justly be fixed at the eleventh century, about the age of William the Conqueror.

The Norman Conquest was the most destructive trauma that the English nation has endured. However this was followed by something even worse, during the next generation. Hume described the crusades, beginning in the reign of William Rufus, as "the most signal and most durable monument of human folly, that has yet appeared in any age or nation" (chapter V). The storming of Jerusalem, 5 July 1099, was attended by a wholesale massacre of Muslims and Jews (chapter 6).

... the triumphant warriors, after every enemy was subdued and slaughtered, immediately turned themselves, with the sentiments of humiliation and contrition, towards the holy sepulchre. They threw aside their arms, still streaming with blood: They advanced with reclined bodies, and naked feet and heads to that sacred monument: They sung anthems to their Saviour, who had there purchased their salvation by his death and agony: And their devotion, enlivened by the presence of the place where he had suffered, so overcame their fury, that they dissolved in tears, and bore the appearance of every soft and tender sentiment. So inconsistent is human nature with itself! And so easily does the most effeminate superstition ally, both with the most heroic courage, and with the fiercest barbarity!

Hume seems to have had access to some version or other of the Koran, which he calls the "alcoran"; and he was aware of what is now remembered as the Golden Age of Islam.

The advantage indeed of science, moderation, humanity, was at that time entirely on the side of the Saracens.

The results of the First Crusade were reversed during the following century. He contrasts Saladin with Richard Coeur de Lion:

this gallant emperor [Saladin], in particular, displayed, during the course of the war, a spirit and generosity, which even his bigoted enemies were obliged to acknowledge and admire. Richard, equally martial and brave, carried with him more of the barbarian character; and was guilty of acts of ferocity, which threw a stain on his celebrated victories.

Hume also writes that on one occasion, Richard ordered the massacre of 5000 defenceless Muslim prisoners, although "the Saracens found themselves obliged to retaliate upon the Christians by a like cruelty". Hume tells how, shortly after his great victory, Saladin's death was proclaimed:

he ordered his winding-sheet to be carried as a standard through every street of the city; while a crier went before, and proclaimed with a loud voice, This is all that remains to the mighty Saladin, the conqueror of the East.

Saladin left his money to charity,

without distinction of Jew, Christian, or Mahometan.

This point of view was followed shortly afterwards in Edward Gibbon's Decline and Fall of the Roman Empire.

== The Pandects of Justinian ==
However, even in the 12th century, there was a glimmer of light.

Perhaps there was no event, which tended farther to the improvement of the age, than one, which has not been much remarked, the accidental finding of a copy of Justinian's Pandects, about the year 1130, in the town of Amalfi in Italy.

Hume would have known about the Pandects as a law student, because Stair's "Institutions" are largely based on them, as are the works of Voet and Vinnius.

It is easy to see what advantages Europe must have reaped by its inheriting at once from the ancients, so complete an art, which was also so necessary for giving security to all other arts, and which, by refining, and still more, by bestowing solidity on the judgment, served as a model to farther improvements.

Hume credits the clergy with spreading the newly found Romano-Greek jurisprudence. However the association the English laity "formed without any necessity" between Roman and canon law:

prevented the Roman jurisprudence from becoming the municipal law of the country, as was the case in many states of Europe.

Nevertheless,

a great part of it was secretly transferred into the practice of the courts of justice, and the imitation of their neighbours made the English gradually endeavour to raise their own law from its original state of rudeness and imperfection.

Thus Hume was writing the history of the common law of England from its origins through its continuing gradual absorption of the international Civil Law.

Hume's nephew and executor, also called David Hume, wrote the "Commentary on the laws of Scotland respecting crimes" as a common law companion to Stair's great work. Both David Humes are buried together, in the old cemetery on the Calton Hill in Edinburgh.

== Hume on the progress of natural philosophy and belles lettres in England ==
The Stanford Encyclopaedia of Philosophy (linked below) describes Hume as "the third of the great triumvirate of "British Empiricists", along with John Locke and Thomas Hobbes. However, he footnotes Locke, along with Algernon Sidney, Rapin de Thoyras and Benjamin Hoadley, as authors whose "compositions the most despicable, both for style and matter, have been extolled, and propagated, and read; as if they had equalled the most celebrated remains of antiquity". Sidney was a complex man. He was appalled by the death sentence on Charles I, but later wrote tracts justifying the deed. In 1683, he was beheaded for alleged complicity in the Rye House plot to murder Charles II, after a notoriously unfair trial. Rapin was a French Protestant who had written a monumental history of England dedicated to George I. Bishop Hoadley was another luminary of the whig establishment. What Hume particularly objects to in Locke is his presentation of Robert Filmer's "absurd" patriarchal theory of government as if it were something new. What these writers shared was belief in a neverland of ancient English freedoms, which the Stuarts had overthrown.

Nor does Hobbes fare any better with Hume: "Hobbes's politics are fitted only to promote tyranny, and his ethics to encourage licentiousness. Though an enemy to religion, he partakes nothing of the spirit of scepticism; but is as positive and dogmatical as if human reason, and his reason in particular, could attain a thorough conviction in these subjects... In his own person he is represented to have been a man of virtue; a character no wise surprising, notwithstanding his libertine system of ethics. Timidity is the principal fault, with which he is reproached: He lived to an extreme old age, yet could never reconcile himself to the thoughts of death. The boldness of his opinions and sentiments form a remarkable contrast to this part of his character. He died in 1679, aged 91."

Hume follows this withering notice on Hobbes with a judiciously favourable review of James Harrington's The Commonwealth of Oceana.

"In Newton this island may boast of having produced the greatest and rarest genius that ever arose for the ornament and instruction of the species". After noting advances made by Boyle and Hooke in the mechanical philosophy, Hume says: "While Newton seemed to draw off the veil from some of the mysteries of nature, he shewed at the same time the imperfections of the mechanical philosophy; and thereby restored her ultimate secrets to that obscurity, in which they ever did and ever will remain". Hume was no mathematical reductionist, like Hobbes.

The only 17th-century Scottish philosopher, other than James I, that Hume applauds is John Napier of Merchiston, the inventor of logarithms. However Napier, Newton and James I are criticised for producing eschatological literature predicting the final days. Writings of this sort were a potent factor in the politico-religious ferment of the time. They were calling for a purification in preparation for the new age of the second coming. Of these three alchemists, Hume writes: "From the grossness of its superstitions, we may infer the ignorance of an age; but never should pronounce concerning the folly of an individual, from his admitting popular errors, consecrated by the appearance of religion".

He calls Francis Bacon "the greatest glory of literature in this island" at the time of James I. However, he also criticises Bacon, in contrast with the earlier Kepler, for treating Nicolaus Copernicus's discovery of the Solar System with disdain. Of Galileo Galilei, Hume writes that Italy had "too much neglected the renown which it has acquired by giving birth to so great a man".

A more extended critique of these early political scientists can be found in "Hobbes" by George Croom Robertson.

Hume allows King Arthur, and even Woden, to have been shadowy historic figures, and he mentions the poet Taliesin (Thaliessin). He rates Alfred the Great beside Charlemagne as a man of letters: "Alfred endeavoured to convey his morality by apologues, parables, stories, apophthegms, couched in poetry; and besides propagating among his subjects, former compositions of that kind, which he found in the Saxon tongue, he exercised his genius in inventing works of a like nature, as well as in translating from the Greek the elegant fables of Aesop. He also gave Saxon translations of Orosius's and Bede's histories; and of Boethius concerning the consolation of philosophy". Actually some of these works were commissioned by Alfred, not by him.

None of the later writers of Arthurian romances get a mention. That is unsurprising. They were (most but not all) glorifying what Hume saw as a period of decadence and decline. "The arts and sciences were imported from Italy into this island as early as into France; and made at first more sensible advances...". So in some need of explanation is why he neglects to mention either Chaucer, Gower or Langland, or what is now called the Ricardian Renaissance. Nor does he mention Chaucer's model Boccaccio either, nor even Dante. He does mention Petrarch, but the rest of the named Italians are of the generation of the High Renaissance: Tasso, Ariosto and Guarini. What Hume found in these Italian writers of the 16th century was romances set in the darkest days of the crusades, featuring antiheroes, Christian or Muslim.

He censured Shakespeare's "barbarism", but insisted that "...Spenser, Shakespeare, Bacon, Jonson were superior to their contemporaries, who flourished in that kingdom (France). Milton, (Edmund) Waller, (John) Denham, (Benjamin) Cowley, (William?) Harvey were at least equal to their contemporaries. The reign of Charles II, which some preposterously represent as our Augustan age, retarded the progress of polite literature in this island, and it was then found that the immeasurable licentiousness, indulged or rather applauded at court, was more destructive to the refined arts, than even the cant, nonsense, and enthusiasm of the preceding period".

Hume passes on an oral tradition about John Milton and the playwright William Davenant: "It is not strange, that Milton received no encouragement after the restoration: It is more to be admired, that he escaped with his life" (for eloquently justifying the regicide). "Many of the cavaliers blamed extremely that lenity towards him, which was so honourable in the king, and so advantageous to posterity. It is said, that he had saved Davenant's life during the protectorship; and Davenant in return afforded him like protection after the restoration; being sensible, that men of letters ought always to regard their sympathy of taste as a more powerful band of union, than any difference of party or opinion as a source of animosity".

== Criticism ==
Since the time of its publication, Hume's History has been accused of historical revisionism intending to promote toryism. In the United States, the Founding Father Thomas Jefferson considered it a "poison" and was so critical of the work that he censored it from the University of Virginia library. In a 12 August 1810 letter to William Duane Jefferson wrote: "It is this book which has undermined the free principles of the English government, [...]" And in a letter to John Adams dated 25 November 1816, he wrote: "This single book has done more to sap the free principles of the English Constitution than the largest standing army [...]" Though generally acknowledged as a plagiarised version of Hume's work, John Baxter's A New and Impartial History of England (1796) was cited by Jefferson as a remedy to Hume's revisionism: "He has taken Hume's work, corrected in the text his misrepresentations, supplied the truths which he suppressed, and yet has given the mass of the work in Hume's own words."

At the end of his life, Hume wrote: "... though I had been taught by experience, that the Whig party were in possession of bestowing all places, both in the state and in literature, I was so little inclined to yield to their senseless clamour, that in above a hundred alterations, which farther study, reading, or reflection engaged me to make in the reigns of the two first Stuarts, I have made all of them invariably to the Tory side. It is ridiculous to consider the English constitution before that period as a regular plan of liberty".

An example of such an alteration is the footnote to the remark above about "despicable productions". The quote here is taken from the online version of 1778. The 1772 Dublin edition only mentions Rapin de Thoyras. Clearly, Algernon Sidney and John Locke had sunk in Hume's estimation during his later years. Hume gives a fair account of Sidney's trial, where the law was twisted so that he could be judged, not for anything he had done, but for what he had written and not even tried to publish. An intriguing question is why Hume included Bishop Hoadley in his rogues' gallery. At the time of the first editions, Hoadley was still alive.

What Hume was combating was the atavism of Whigs who, like Jefferson, wanted to portray the regicides as heroic patriots who stamped the first great seal of the Commonwealth with the legend: "ON THE FIRST YEAR OF FREEDOM, BY GOD’S BLESSING, RESTORED, 1648" (old style). Judge Bradshaw sentenced the King on the grounds of his having broken "a contract and bargain made between the king and his people", without being able to state what this contract was, or when it had been made. He was uncomfortable with the legality of the English precedents for deposing kings: Edward II and Richard II. So he turned to the Scottish Parliament's precedent in dethroning Queen Mary for complicity in murder (ut supra). He could have cited another perfectly good precedent in the dethroning of John Balliol and his replacement with Robert the Bruce; but he passed that precedent by, vaguely referring instead to the numerous Dark Age regicides recorded in George Buchanan's "history".

Atavism is just as detectable in the attorney who led the prosecution against the king, John Cooke. He prosecuted as an English traitor the general of the Scottish Parliament's army for King and Covenant in the War of the Engagement, on the strength of evidence derived from Geoffrey of Monmouth that there had been a dark age union of England and Scotland. Astonishingly, Cooke also appealed to recent treaties, notably the Solemn League and Covenant, as a kind of union; though it had just been abrogated by the Rump Parliaments unilateral execution of the king.

Hume passed on an oral tradition that Cromwell, through his Stewart mother, was a cousin of Charles I. Thomas Carlyle did some further research, concluding: "The genealogists say, there is no doubt of this pedigree ...". Carlyle does, however, add in a footnote to that very sentence that "This theory [...] has been entirely refuted by Mr. Walter Rye, who shows that Mrs. Cromwell was descended from an old Norfolk family, originally named Styward." There seems to be no further evidence to support Hume's 'oral tradition.'

Unlike Locke, Hobbes or Jefferson, Hume considered that government by consent rested on public opinion alone. He did not derive it from a primeval contract made in the state of nature between ruler and ruled, except in a vague anthropological sense. He recognised that such theories are wide open to antinomianism. Undefined social contract theory can be taken as the framework for Hobbist authoritarianism, as easily as it can be for Lockist libertarianism. It can be made to mean anything. Government by contract is not something given in nature, but something in need of definition in relevant circumstances. For Hume, the prevailing British Constitution became contractual when William and Mary signed the declarations of right. This was the result of a lawful forfeiture. Hume did not want it to be seen, as Danton and Trotsky later saw it, as the result of a beheading.

Hume was a close friend and correspondent of Benjamin Franklin. He came to support independence for the American colonies; and lived just long enough to hear of the American Declaration of Independence. The founding father closest to his thinking was Alexander Hamilton. Like Hume, Hamilton had to put up with prejudice on account of his Scottish ancestry, which he could trace back at least to the time of the Declaration of Arbroath.

The publications of Hume's Histories coincided with the revival of the British Tory Party, after decades of being tainted as the Jacobite Party. There is a parallel here with the eclipse of the US Democratic Party, in the decades when it was seen as the party of the aristocracy of the Antebellum South. Part of Jefferson's hostility to Hume may have been associative with Hume's defence of James Macpherson in the Ossian Controversy. Macpherson was a Tory opponent of American independence.

In the years after Hume's death the Whig party also reinvented itself as the Liberal party of reform. The philosophic followers of Hume in Scotland were often, like Robert Adamson, of the Liberal left; and tended to see Hume as Tory-leaning. However this must be seen in the context of the self-serving whig history of Hume's time. Hume's roots were in the Revolution of the Scottish Whigs in 1688–9. His grandfather's name is on the Scottish Parliament's muster role as a Lieutenant-Colonel of the Berwickshire militia.

Hume lived in a post-revolutionary environment, and he did not want there to be another revolution. He did not demonise heroes of the revolution any more than he glorified them. He wanted them to be examined critically.
