= Portrait of Queen Charlotte (Beechey) =

Painting by William Beechey

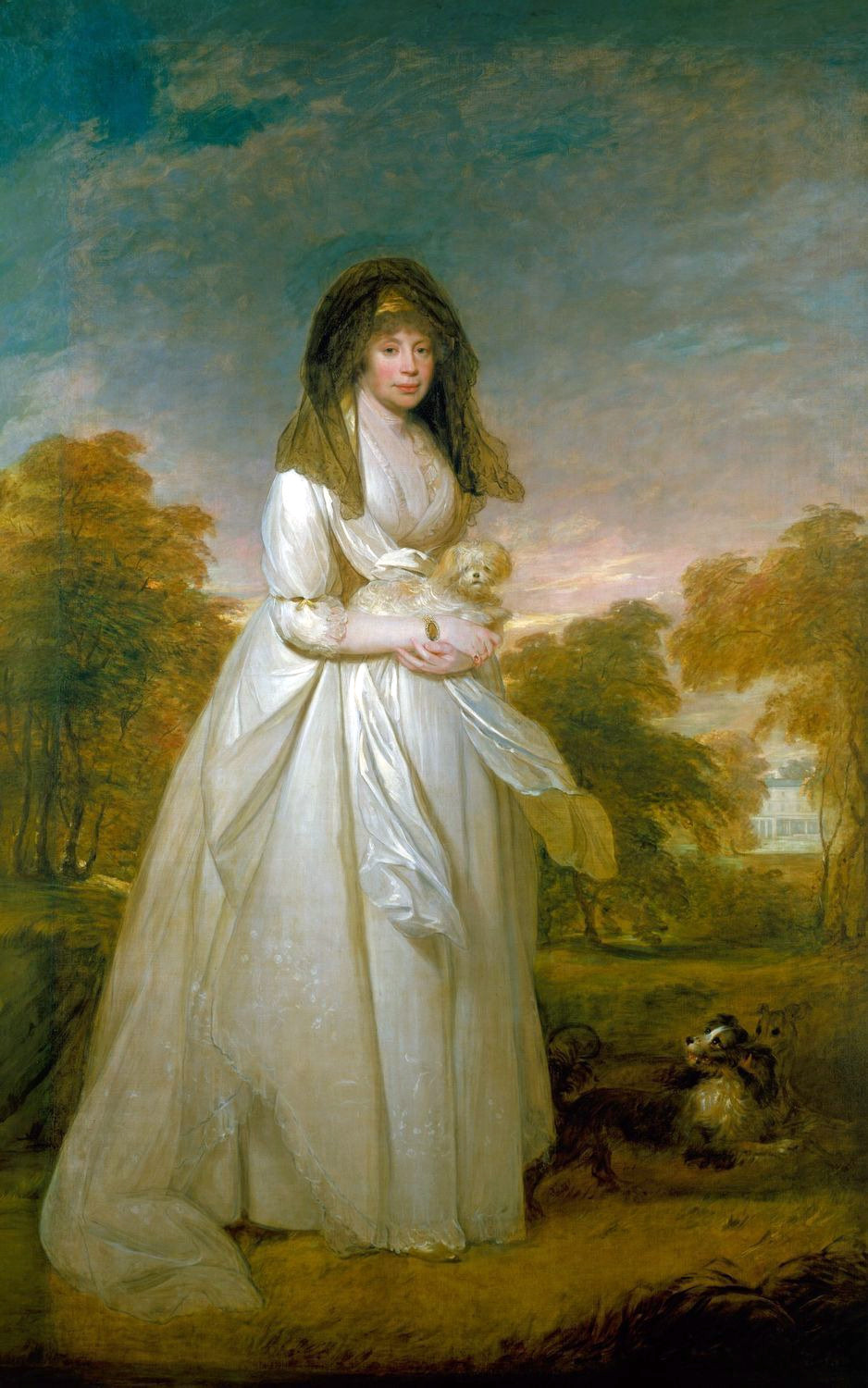
- Original version in the Royal Collection at Buckingham Palace
- Artist: William Beechey
- Year: 1796
- Type: Oil on canvas, portrait painting
- Dimensions: 250.8 cm × 159.1 cm (98.7 in × 62.6 in)
- Location: Buckingham Palace, London

The Portrait of Queen Charlotte is a portrait painting of 1796 by the British artist William Beechey depicting Queen Charlotte, wife of the reigning British monarch George III.

The work was commissioned by the King and was painted at Windsor. Charlotte was depicted wearing contemporary dress and carrying a Maltese dog, while two other dogs walk next to her on the ground. Both the version in the Royal Collection and the one at the Courtauld Institute of Art show the Queen walking the grounds of the Frogmore estate, where her residence Frogmore House was located. Another version at Upton House, Warwickshire, shows her at the garden at Frogmore but with Windsor Castle behind her.

Beechey secured many royal commissions. He stood for election as President of the Royal Academy in 1830 but lost out to his fellow portraitist Martin Archer Shee. The painting was shown at the Royal Academy Exhibition of 1797. George hung the painting at his summer residence Kew Palace. It was later moved to the Principal Staircase at Buckingham Palace, where it remains today.

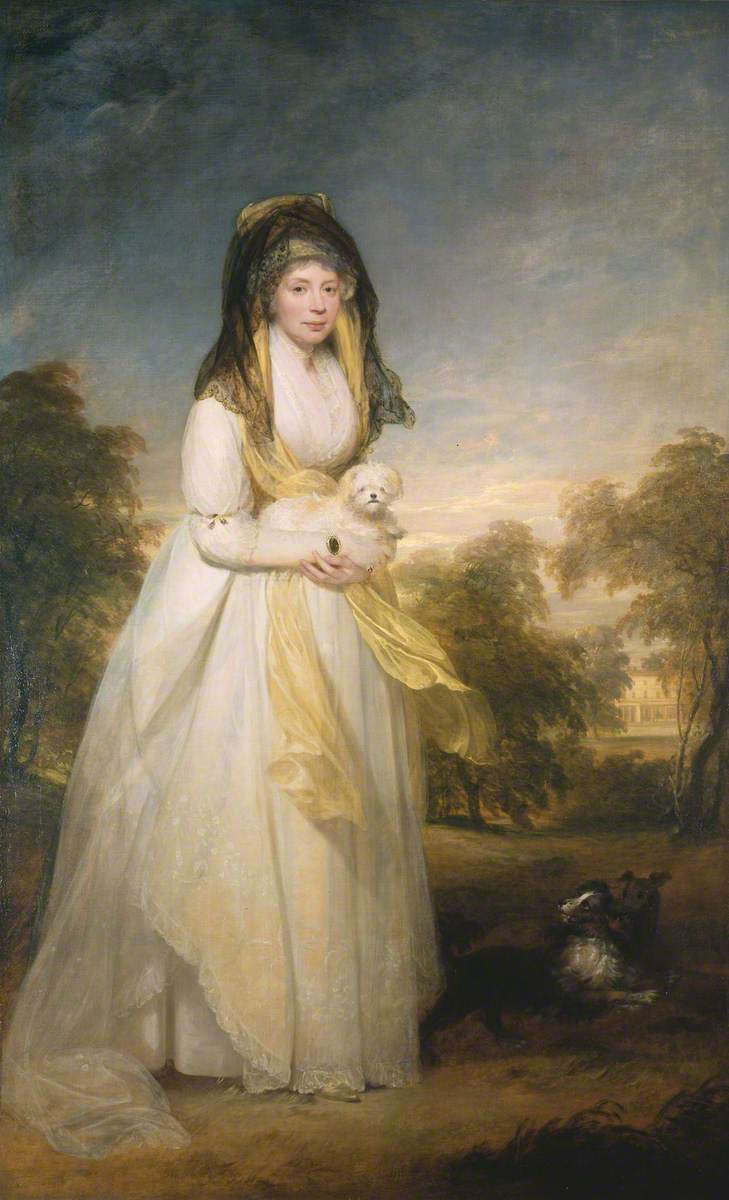
Version in the Courtauld Institute of Art

== Bibliography ==
- Robinson, Leonard. William Etty: The Life and Art. McFarland, 2007.
- Roberts, William. Sir William Beechey, R.A.. Duckworth and Company, 1907.
