= The Earl of Warwick's Vow =

Painting by Henry Tresham

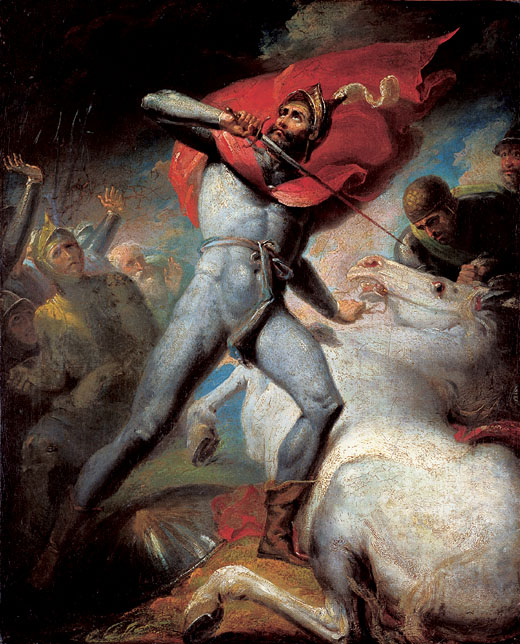
- Artist: Henry Tresham
- Year: 1795
- Type: Oil on canvas, history painting
- Dimensions: 44 cm × 35.8 cm (17 in × 14.1 in)
- Location: Manchester Art Gallery, Greater Manchester

The Earl of Warwick's Vow Previous to the Battle of Towton is a 1795 history painting by the Irish artist Henry Tresham. It depicts a scene from the Wars of the Roses. Before the Battle of Towton in March 1461, Richard, Earl of Warwick vows to remain on the battlefield regardless of the result and conquer or die. Even killing his own horse so he cannot escape.

== Context ==
Warwick, later known as the "Kingmaker" for his role in placing different monarchs on the throne, swore revenge for the death of his father the Earl of Salisbury at the Battle of Wakefield the previous year. Often considered to be England's bloodiest battle, Towton ended in a decisive Yorkist victory leading to Edward VI becoming king.

== History ==
The painting was commissioned by Robert Bowyer to hang at his Historic Gallery at Schomberg House in Pall Mall. An engraving was produced to illustrate an edition of David Hume's The History of England, which has inspired it. The painting was displayed at the Royal Academy Exhibition of 1797 at Somerset House in London. Today the picture is in the collection of the Manchester Art Gallery, having been acquired in 1966.

== Bibliography ==
- Crookshank, Anne. Painters of Ireland, C. 1660-1920. Barrie & Jenkins, 1979.
- Myrone, Martin, Frayling, Christopher & Warner, Marina. Gothic Nightmares: Fuseli, Blake and the Romantic Imagination. Harry N. Abrams, 2006
