= Museum of the University of St Andrews =

Museum in St Andrews, Scotland

Coordinates: 56.3429°N 2.794°W

Wardlaw Museum
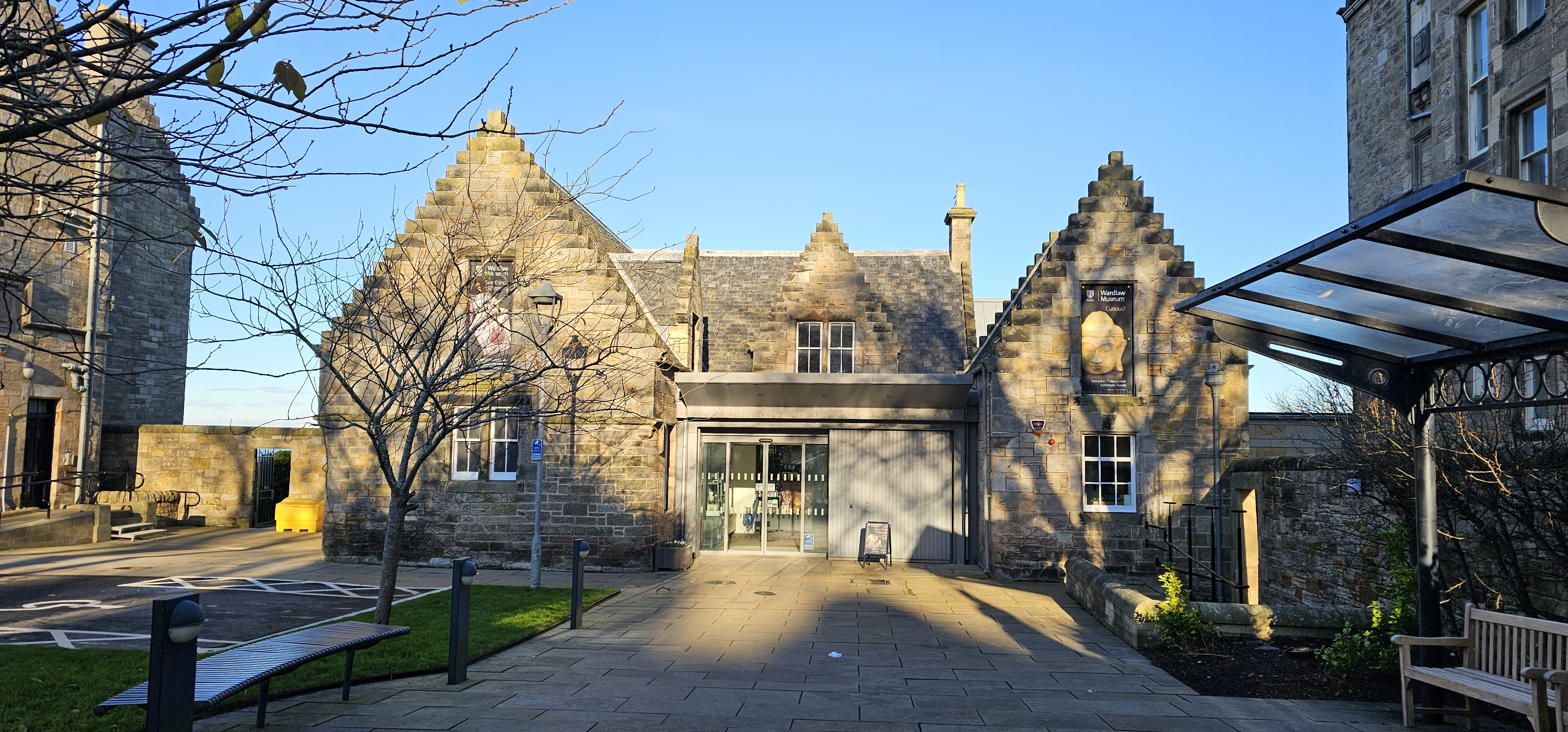
- The museum in November 2024
- Location: St. Andrews, Scotland
- Website: st-andrews.ac.uk/museums/visit-us/wardlaw/

The Wardlaw Museum is associated with the University of St Andrews. The museum houses a selection of the university's historic, artistic and scientific collections, which comprise over 115,000 artefacts. They are displayed across four galleries which aim to tell the story of the university. The newly refurbished museum now has an extended temporary exhibition space as well as a new research studio and extended gift shop. also contains a 'Learning Loft' for workshops and a viewing terrace with panoramic views over St Andrews Bay.

== Themes and collections ==
The four galleries aim to tell the story of the University of St Andrews from its foundation in 1410 until the present day. Each gallery takes a different theme. 'Scotland's First University' covers the foundation and early period of the university's history. 'Living and Learning' examines student life at St Andrews and looks at aspects such as dining, student societies and the iconic red gown. 'Seeing and Believing' investigates the big ideas that have emerged from students, staff and alumni in the areas of Science, Theology and the Arts and features figures such as astronomer James Gregory (mathematician), mathematician John Napier and theologian Samuel Rutherford. The fourth gallery is now used for temporary exhibitions and shows a range of changing displays. Recent exhibitions have included the history of medicine at the university and a display of artworks representing Britain during the Second World War, some from the university's own collection and some on loan from the Victoria & Albert Museum, London.

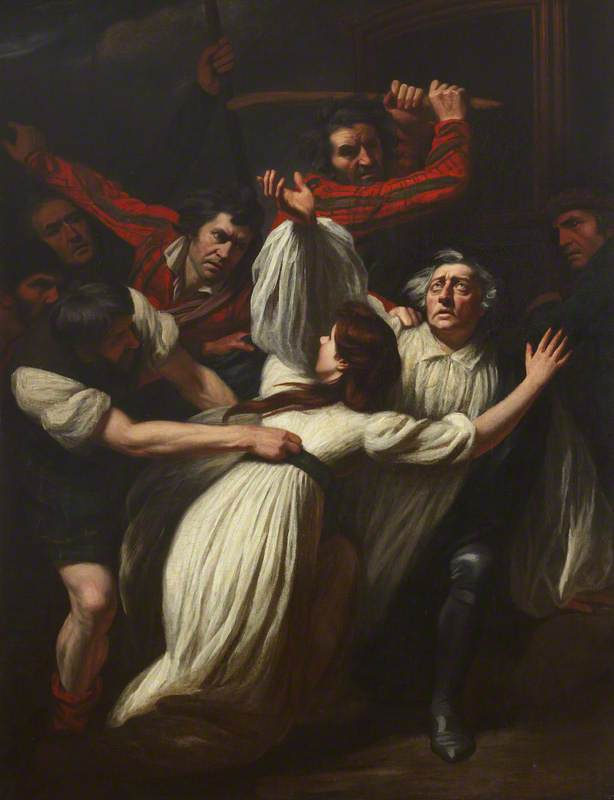
The Death of Archbishop Sharpe by John Opie, 1797

The university's collection includes three Recognised Collections of National Significance. These are collections that are judged to be of national or international importance. The three Recognised Collections at the university are the Heritage Collection, the Collection of Historic Scientific Instruments and the Chemistry Collection. A selection of the most important items from each of these collections is on display in MUSA.

The museum considers its highlight to be three medieval ceremonial maces which date from the 15th century. The oldest of these, the Mace of the Faculty of Arts, was commissioned in 1416 and was probably made in Paris. It has a simple hexagonal head on which are engraved the images of saints and the coats of arms of various important families from the time of the foundation of the University of St Andrews. The second mace, that of the College of St Salvator, was made in Paris by Jean Maiel in 1461. The head is considered by some to be one of the finest pieces of medieval European silverware in existence. It shows Christ, or St Salvator, in the centre of an architectural shrine. He stands on a globe with his hands raised to show the nail marks. Around him stand three angels, each holding a symbol of the passion. The third mace, that of the Faculty of Canon Law, was probably made in Scotland in the mid-15th century and is thought to be a copy of the Mace of the Faculty of Arts, though the quality is not as good. Its probable origin in Scotland makes it particularly rare. These maces are still used during graduation ceremonies.

Other highlights include the Great Astrolabe, made in 1575, which was purchased by James Gregory in the 17th century. It is believed this is the biggest historic astrolabe in existence. A collection of 70 medals given to the university by the winners of its Silver Arrow Competition between 1612 and 1754 are also important, especially given that many were commissioned by students who would go on to play important roles in Scottish politics. Some items give insights into student life, such as the black stone, on which students sat from the early 15th century to take their oral examinations. A stained glass window dedicated to Thomas Chalmers, the leader of the Disruption of the Church of Scotland, an early Gregorian Reflecting Telescope, made by James Short in 1734, and a mazer which is the earliest known fully hallmarked piece of Edinburgh silver are also of some importance.

The museum occasionally displays the only surviving one of the six bulls sent by Pope Benedict XIII to found the University of St Andrews in 1413. Owing to its age and consequent fragility, however, a facsimile is usually on display.

== Programme of events ==
The museum runs a wide-ranging programme of talks, workshops and tours on a variety of subjects related to its collections. The programme currently comprises around 200 events each year. On top of this the museum offers a comprehensive schools programme.

A significant part of the museum's schools provision is based around the annual MUSA Young Artist Award. The competition has been organised by MUSA each year since 2007, when it was funded by the Vettriano Trust. The competition takes a different theme each year and offers schools in Fife the opportunity to participate in workshops which prepare pupils for the contest by helping them develop their artistic abilities. They are then invited to submit entries. The 2016 competition received over one thousand entries and saw nearly 1400 pupils participate in workshops. Prizes are awarded in six categories and winning artworks are displayed in an exhibition at a venue in St Andrews.

A Youth Curator programme also allows teenagers in the area to gain behind-the-scenes access and get experience by putting on an exhibition at the museum.

== Funding ==
Funding comes from a variety of sources, principally from the University of St Andrews itself and from the Scottish Funding Council. The museum was founded with financial assistance from the Heritage Lottery Fund and Museums Galleries Scotland, as well as donations from other groups and individuals. A full list of donors is on display in the museum entrance. Funding for projects is regularly gained from a variety of grant-giving bodies.

== Awards and criticism ==
MUSA has been awarded five stars, the highest available rating, by VisitScotland and won the Association of Scottish Visitor Attractions' 'Best Visitor Experience' Award in 2016, having previously been a runner-up in 2012 and 2014. In 2011 the Association of Scottish Visitor Attractions presented Sarah Hammond, one of the museum's staff members, with the Rising Star Award. The museum has a score of four and a half out of five on Trip Advisor.

The museum received a critical review in Museums Journal shortly after opening in which particular attention was paid to the large amount of text in displays and to the supposed lack of event programming. Letters disputing the latter, one from the museum's director and another from a Fife-based charity with which the museum worked, were published in the Journal the following month.

== Famous visitors ==
MUSA has been visited by a number of famous faces. His Royal Highness Prince William visited in 2011 with his then fiancé Catherine Middleton as part of the celebrations for the university's 600th anniversary. During the visit they examined the papal bull and were given a guided tour of the museum by Director Ian Carradice. Both Prince William and the Duchess of Cambridge are alumni of the university.

The museum was opened in 2008 by crime writer Ian Rankin, who had the opportunity to see rarely displayed life masks of Edinburgh grave robbers Burke and Hare.

The museum has featured on the BBC2 series Celebrity Antiques Roadtrip, when news reader Alastair Stewart visited, and has welcomed Elaine C. Smith for a forthcoming documentary.

The museum has an audio guide that is narrated by actress Joanna Lumley, although Lumley has not visited the museum in person.

== Associated venues ==
MUSA comes under the remit of the Museum Collections Unit at the University of St Andrews. Museum Collections has responsibility for three other public venues at the university, all of which share exhibition and event programmes with MUSA.

The Gateway Galleries was a temporary exhibition space located on the university's North Haugh campus where four exhibitions were shown annually. The displays covered a range of topics until the venue closed in 2016.

The Bell Pettigrew Museum of Natural History is the university's oldest museum venue. It is located in the Bute Building, off St Mary's Quad, and was founded in memory of Professor James Bell Pettigrew, Chair of Medicine at the university. The museum houses a collection of natural history and zoology specimens, many of which date back to the Victorian period. Collections are displayed in the museum's original display cases and maintain the same approach to display as the original Edwardian foundation.

The MUSA Collections Centre, located in the centre of St Andrews, is one of the university's museum stores. Regular tours of the site are offered to the public, allowing visitors to see items that are not on display and to get a glimpse behind the scenes. The venue to open to pre-arrange visits for researchers.
