= Moonlight, a Study at Millbank (J. M. W. Turner) =

Painting by J. M. W. Turner

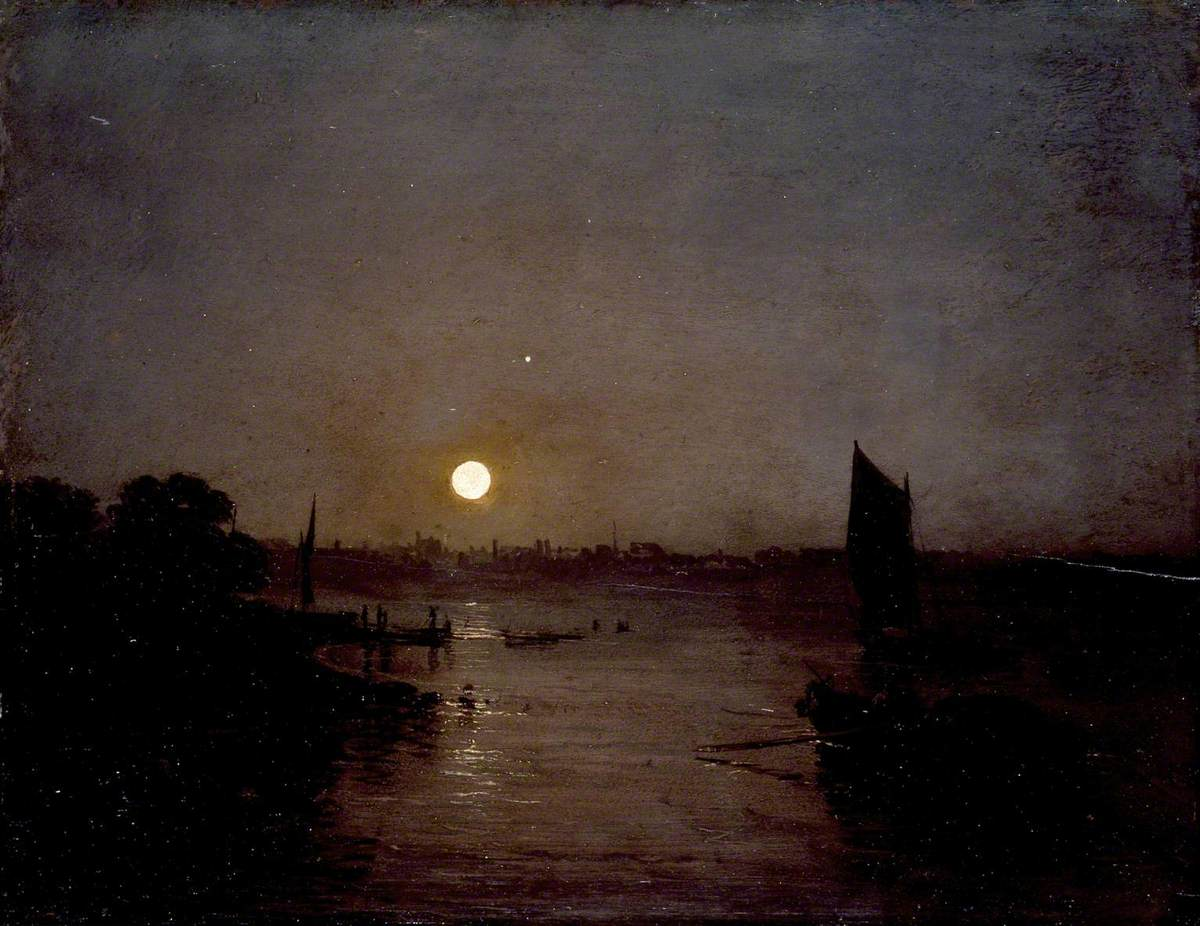
- Artist: J. M. W. Turner
- Year: c. 1797
- Medium: oil on mahogany board
- Dimensions: 40.3 cm × 31.4 cm (15.9 in × 12.4 in)
- Location: Tate Gallery, London
- Website: www.tate.org.uk/...n00459

Moonlight, a Study at Millbank is an oil painting by J. M. W. Turner, painted c. 1797. The nocturne is painted in oils on a mahogany board which measures 31.4 cm × 40.3 cm (12.4 in × 15.9 in). It has been held by the Tate Gallery since 1910.

The work depicts a nighttime view of the River Thames from Millbank, near the current location of Tate Britain, with the low Moon glinting on the water and silhouetting buildings, trees, and boats. Turner exhibited the painting at the Royal Academy Exhibition of 1797, the year after another early work was shown there: another maritime nocturne, Fishermen at Sea.

The painting was left to the British nation as part of the Turner Bequest, then titled "River Scene Moonlight". It was transferred to the new National Gallery of British Art (now the Tate Gallery) in 1910. For many years, this painting was mistakenly considered to be the first oil painting that Turner had exhibited, until Fishermen at Sea was identified.

== See also ==
- List of paintings by J. M. W. Turner
- Catalogue Entry
