= Henry Tresham =

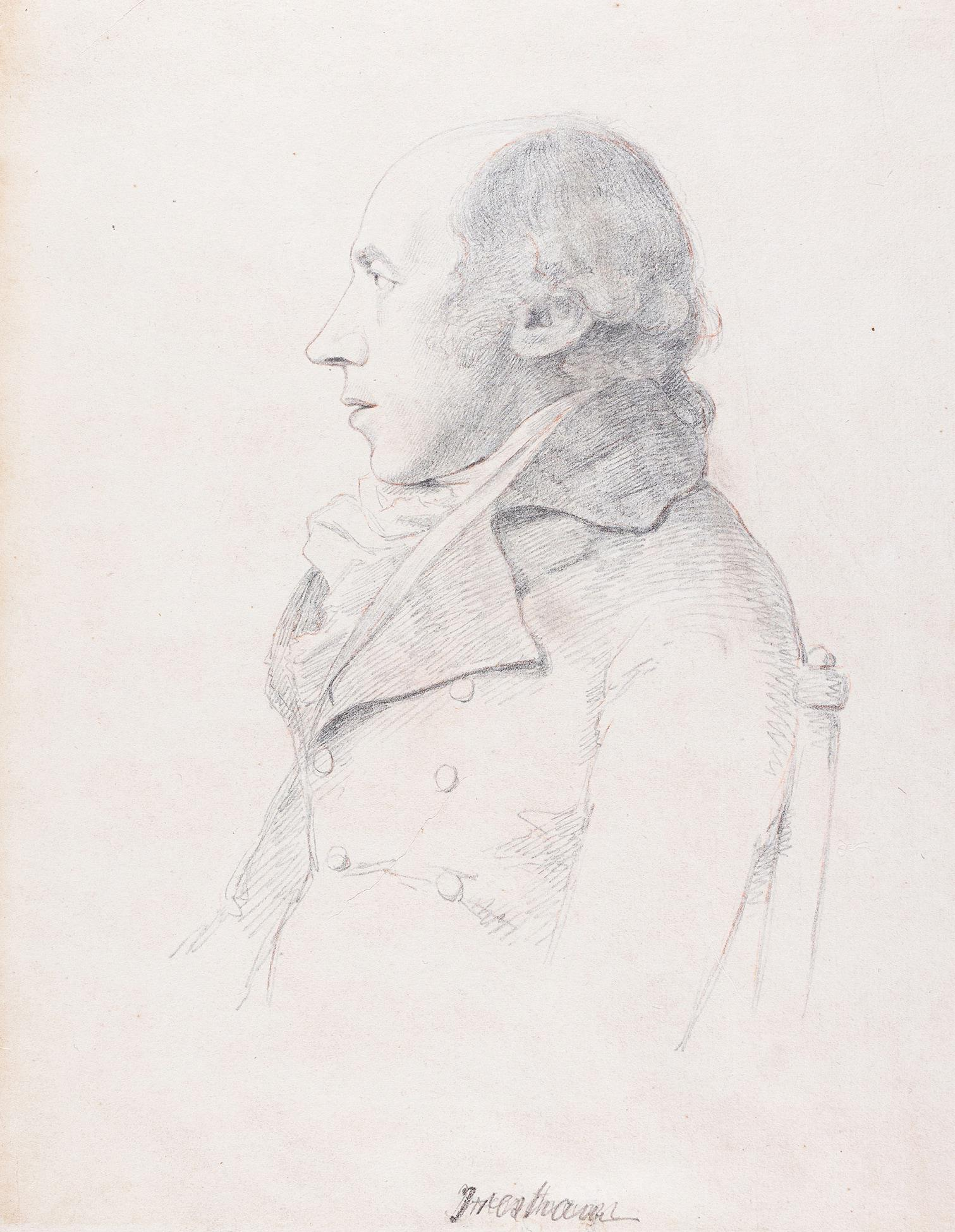
'Henry Tresham' – William Daniell after George Dance the Younger, chalk and pencil drawing

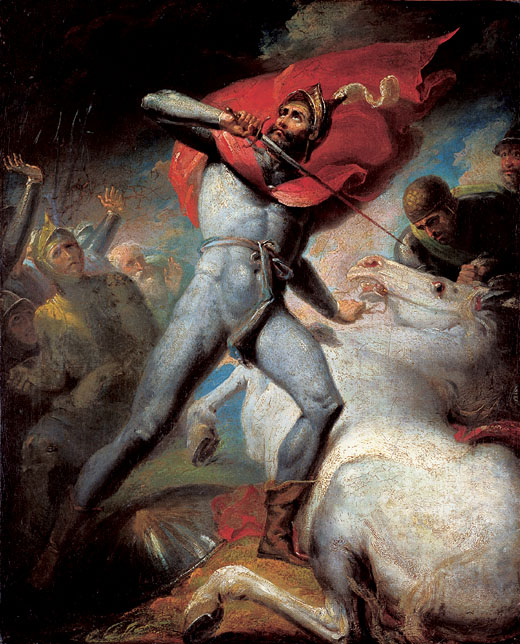
The Earl of Warwick's Vow (1795; Manchester Art Gallery).

Henry Tresham RA (c.1751 – 17 June 1814) was an Irish-born British historical painter active in London in the late 18th century. He spent some time in Rome early in his career, and was professor of painting at the Royal Academy of Arts in London from 1807 to 1809.

== Biography ==
Henry Tresham was born in about 1751. He received his first art instruction from W. Ennis, a pupil of Robert West at the Dublin Art School.

He moved to England in 1775, but spent most of the next fourteen years in Rome. There he became a friend of the British painter, Thomas Jones and the artist and dealer, Gavin Hamilton. Like many other artists in Rome he also acted as a dealer, working with Gavin Hamilton and Thomas Jenkins, and negotiating sales of antiquities to Frederick Hervey and John Campbell. He also acted as an intermediary between Campbell and the sculptor, Antonio Canova: a pastel by Hugh Douglas Hamilton of Antonio Canova in his studio with Henry Tresham and a plaster model for Cupid and Psyche, showing a work commissioned by Campbell, is in the collection of the Victoria and Albert Museum, London.

Tresham returned to Britain in 1788. His reputation was gained primarily through large-scale history paintings, somewhat similar in style to those of Henry Fuseli. These were based on his travels to Rome.

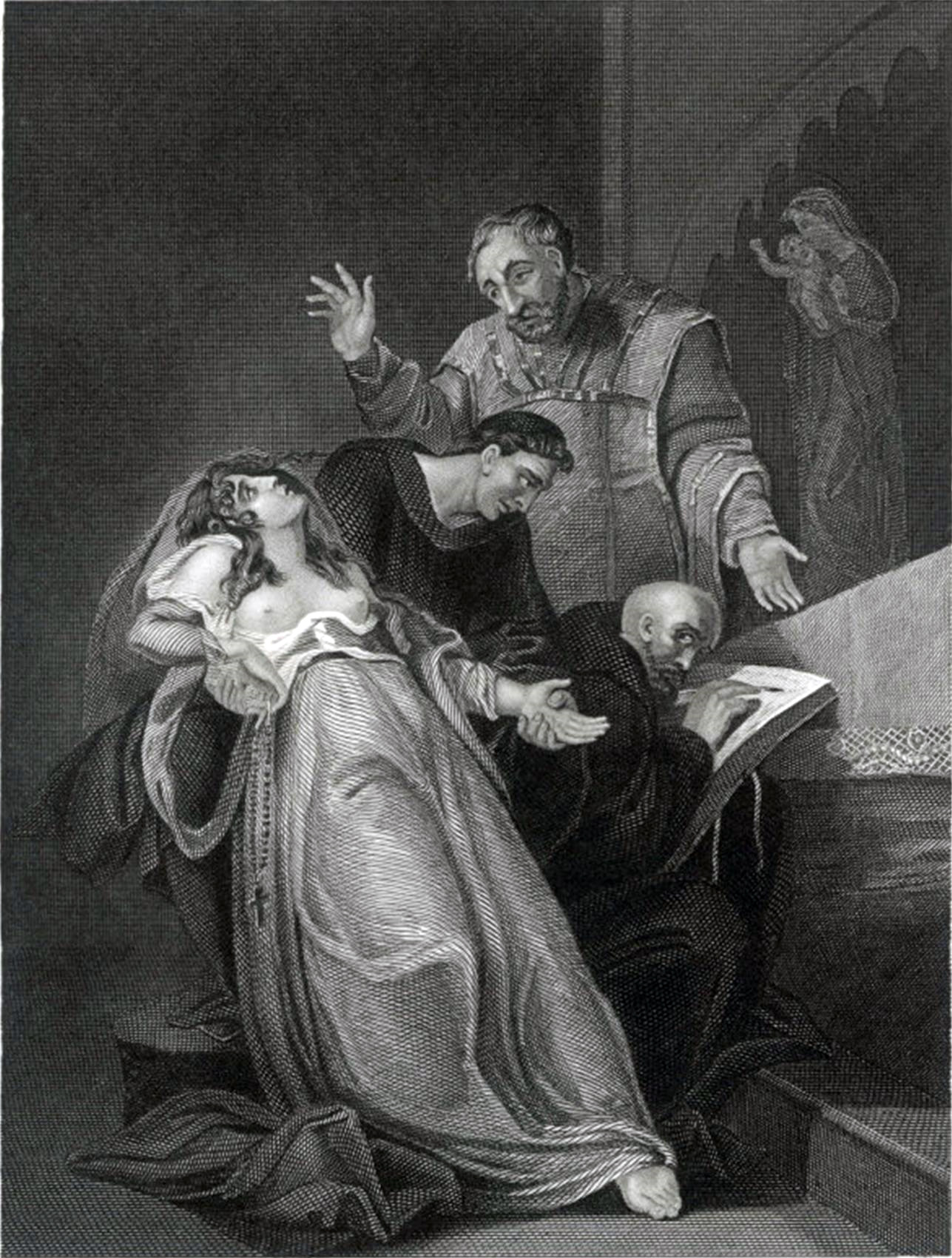
This engraving of Elizabeth Barton is probably by Thomas Holloway based on a painting by Henry Tresham for David Hume's History of England (1793–1806).

In 1791 he was elected an Associate of the Royal Academy, and became a full Academician in 1799. Soon afterwards he was at the centre of a dispute over the running of the institution, having complained to the king that the law in the "Instrument of Institution" – its founding constitution – under which all its members were supposed to serve on its council in turn, was being ignored, and the vacancies balloted for instead. His appeal to the monarch was ultimately successful, and the practice of the rotation of the council members reinstated.

He was professor of painting at the Academy from 1807 to 1809. He was involved in several of the major history painting ventures of late 18th-century London, including Robert Bowyer's History Gallery, the Boydell Shakespeare Gallery and Thomas Macklin's Holy Bible.

He died in 1814.

== Sources ==
- Hodgson, J. E.; Eaton, Frederick A. (1905). The Royal Academy and its Members 1768-1830. London: John Murray.
