= Portrait of Queen Charlotte =

Portrait of Queen Charlotte may refer to:

- Coronation Portrait of Queen Charlotte, a 1762 painting by Allan Ramsay
- Portrait of Queen Charlotte, a 1769 painting by Nathaniel Dance-Holland
- Portrait of Queen Charlotte, a 1771 painting by Johan Zoffany
- Portrait of Queen Charlotte, a 1779 painting by Benjamin West
- Portrait of Queen Charlotte, a 1781 painting by Thomas Gainsborough
- Portrait of Queen Charlotte, a 1789 painting by Thomas Lawrence
- Portrait of Queen Charlotte, a 1796 painting by William Beechey
