= A Florentine Fruit Stall =

Painting by Johann Zoffany

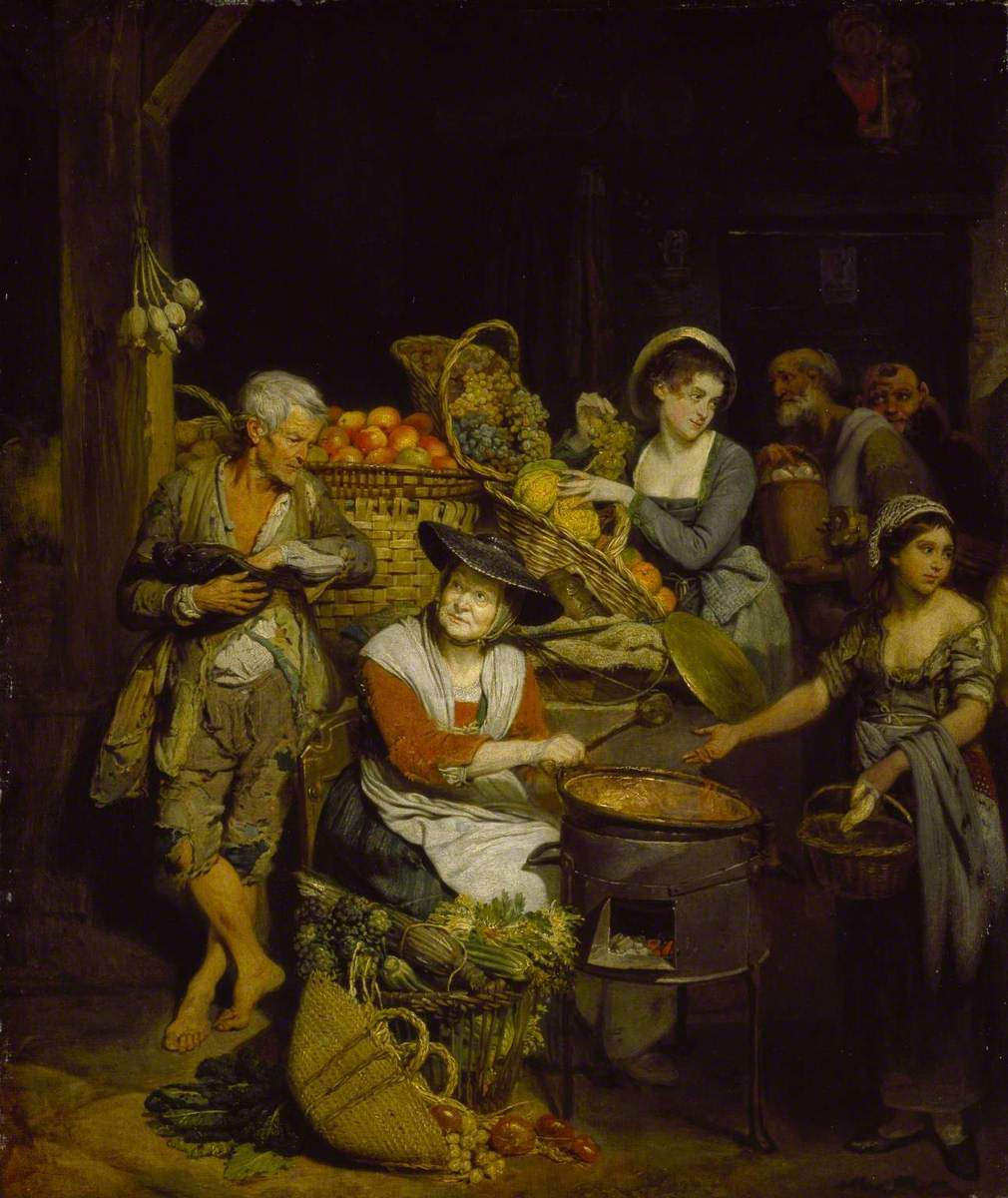
- Artist: Johan Zoffany
- Year: 1777
- Type: Oil on canvas, genre painting
- Dimensions: 49.4 cm × 58 cm (19.4 in × 23 in)
- Location: Tate Britain; London

A Florentine Fruit Stall is an oil on canvas genre painting by the German-British artist Johan Zoffany, from 1777. It portrays fruit vendors at a stall in Florence in Tuscany. The main figures are the stallholder, her daughter, a country girl with a basket, a beggar and a capuchin friar. It may have included additional figure on the right which were later cut off.

It was painted while he was in the city to fulfill a commission from Queen Charlotte The Tribuna of the Uffizi. Painted purely for his own interest, the fruit sellers remained in his studio until his death in 1810. Today the painting is in the collection of the Tate Britain in London, having been acquired in 1955.

== Bibliography ==
- Treadwell, Penelope. Johan Zoffany: Artist and Adventurer. Paul Holberton, 2009.
- Webster, Mary. Johan Zoffany, 1733-1810. National Portrait Gallery, 1976.
