= Johan Zoffany =

German painter (1733–1810)

Freiherr Johan Zoffany RA
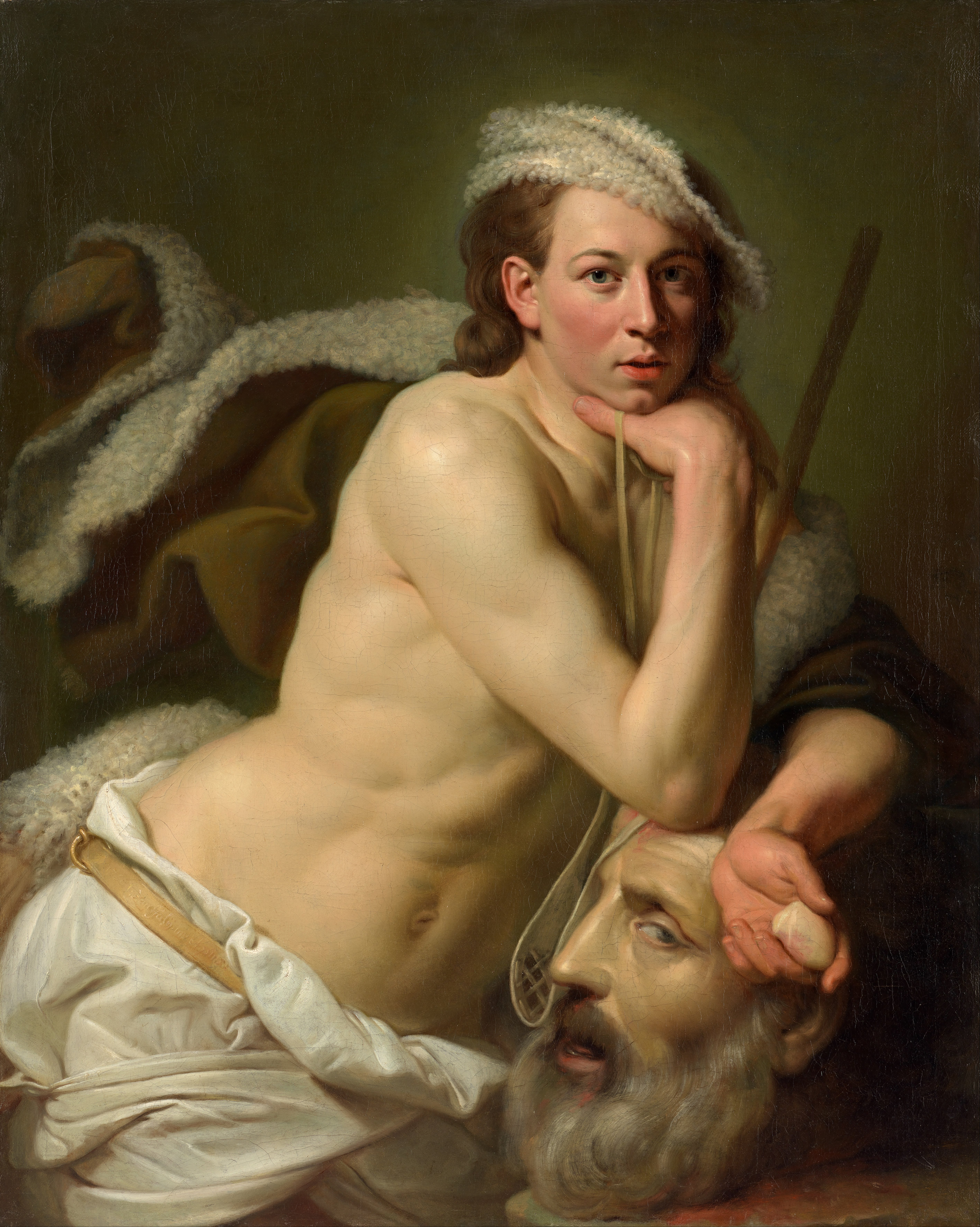
- Self-portrait, c. 1756
- Born: Johannes Josephus Zaufallij; 13 March 1733; Frankfurt, Holy Roman Empire
- Died: 11 November 1810 (aged 77); London, England
- Known for: Painting

Johan / Johann Joseph Zoffany RA (born Johannes Josephus Zaufallij; 13 March 1733 – 11 November 1810) was a German neoclassical painter who was active mainly in England, Italy, and India. His works appear in many prominent British collections, including the National Gallery, the Tate Gallery and the Royal Collection, as well as institutions in continental Europe, India, the United States and Australia. His name is sometimes spelled Zoffani or Zauffelij (on his grave, it is spelled Zoffanij).

== Life and career ==
Of noble Hungarian and Bohemian origin, Johan Zoffany was born near Frankfurt on 13 March 1733, the son of a cabinet maker and architect of the court of Alexander Ferdinand, 3rd Prince of Thurn and Taxis. He undertook an initial period of study in a sculptor's workshop in Ellwangen during the 1740s, possibly the shop of Melchior Paulus, and later at Regensburg with the artist Martin Speer.

In 1750, he travelled to Rome, entering the studio of Agostino Masucci. In the autumn of 1760, he arrived in England and initially found work with the clockmaker Stephen Rimbault, painting decorative designs for his clocks.

By 1764, Zoffany was enjoying the patronage of King George III and Queen Charlotte for his charmingly informal scenes such as Queen Charlotte and Her Two Eldest Children (1765), in which the queen is shown at her toilette inside Buckingham House. He was also popular with the Austrian imperial family and was created a baron of the Holy Roman Empire in 1776 by Empress Maria Theresa.

A founding member of the new Royal Academy of Arts in 1768, Zoffany enjoyed great popularity for his society and theatrical portraits. He painted many prominent actors and actresses, in particular David Garrick, the most famous actor of his day, often in costume – Garrick as Hamlet and Garrick as King Lear.

Zoffany was a master of what has been called the 'theatrical conversation piece', a sub-set of the 'conversation piece' genre that arose with the middle classes in the 18th century. (The conversation piece – or conversazione – was a relatively small, though not necessarily inexpensive, informal group portrait, often of a family group or a circle of friends. This genre developed in the Netherlands and France, and it became popular in Britain from about 1720.) Zoffany has been described by one critic as "the real creator and master of this genre".

He painted a number of 'conversation pieces' featuring a violoncello – the Cowper-Gore family, Sharp family, Morse and Cator family, and the family of Sir William Young. Around 1780, he painted a portrait of the octogenarian professional cellist and composer Giacomo Cervetto.

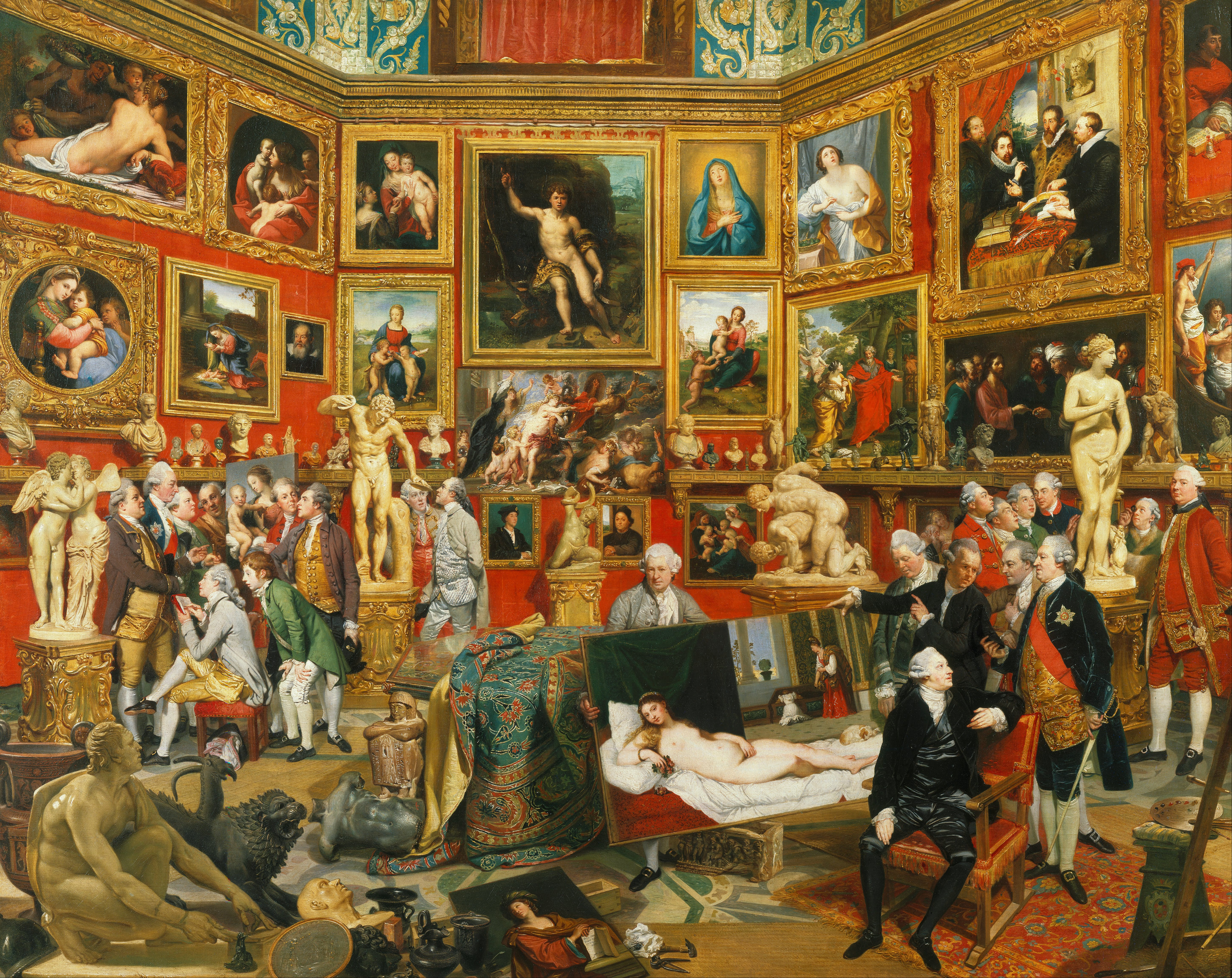
The Tribuna of the Uffizi (1772–1778), Royal Collection

In the later part of his life, Zoffany was especially known for producing huge paintings with large casts of people and works of art, all readily recognizable by their contemporaries. In paintings like The Tribuna of the Uffizi, he carried this fidelity to an extreme degree – the Tribuna was already displayed in the typically cluttered 18th-century manner (i.e. with many objects hanging in a small area, stacked high on the wall), but Zoffany added to the sense of clutter by having other works brought into the small octagonal gallery space from other parts of the Uffizi.

Zoffany spent the years 1783 to early 1789 in India, where he painted portraits including the Governor-General of Bengal, Warren Hastings, and the Nawab of Awadh, Asaf-ud-Daula; an altarpiece of the Last Supper (1787) for St John's Church, Calcutta; and a vibrant history painting, Colonel Mordaunt's Cock Fight (1784–86) (Tate), described by historian Maya Jasanoff as 'easily the liveliest illustration of early colonial India'. In the usual way, he sired several children by an Indian mistress, or 'uppa-patni'. Returning to England, he was shipwrecked off the Andaman Islands. The survivors held a lottery in which the loser (a sailor) was eaten. William Dalrymple describes Zoffany as having been "the first and last Royal Academician to have become a cannibal".

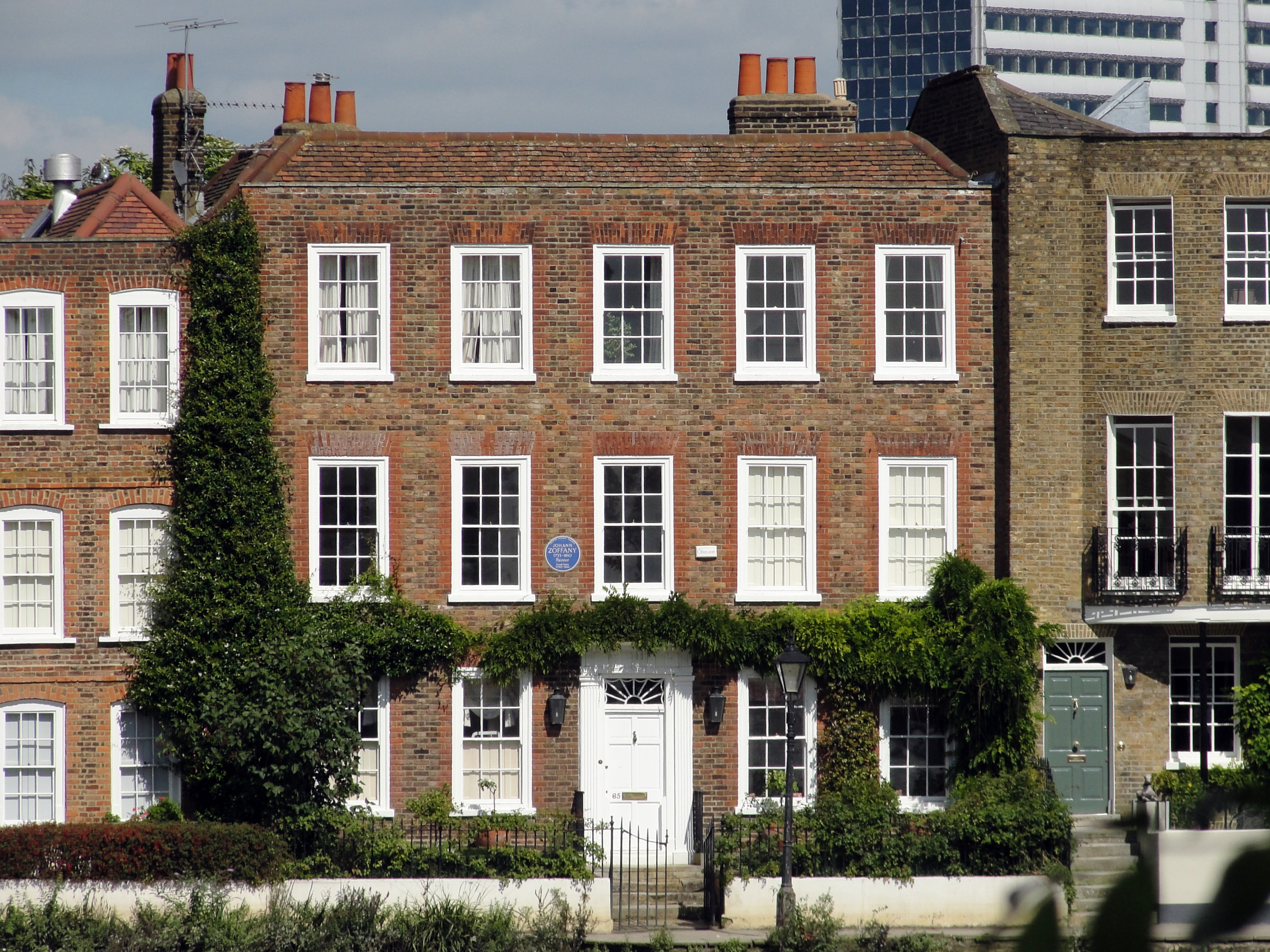
Zoffany's former house at 65 Strand-on-the-Green, Chiswick, London

Zoffany died in his home at Strand-on-the-Green on 11 November 1810. He is buried in the churchyard of St Anne's Church, Kew.

== Marriages and children ==
Around the age of 27, Zoffany married the daughter of a court official in Würzburg. She accompanied him to London but returned to Germany within a decade or so.

Zoffany left for Florence in 1772 and was followed by young Mary Thomas, the daughter of a London glovemaker, who was carrying his first child. Whether they married in Europe is uncertain, but Zoffany's portrait, Mary Thomas, the Artist's second wife (c. 1781–82), shows her wearing a wedding ring.

Following the death of his first wife in 1805, Zoffany married "Mary Thomas … Spinster" in accordance with Church of England rites. Johan and Mary Zoffany had five children, including a son (who died in infancy) and four daughters. Their second daughter, Cecilia (1779–1830), was involved in a well-publicised child custody case in Guernsey in 1825.

== Critical legacy ==
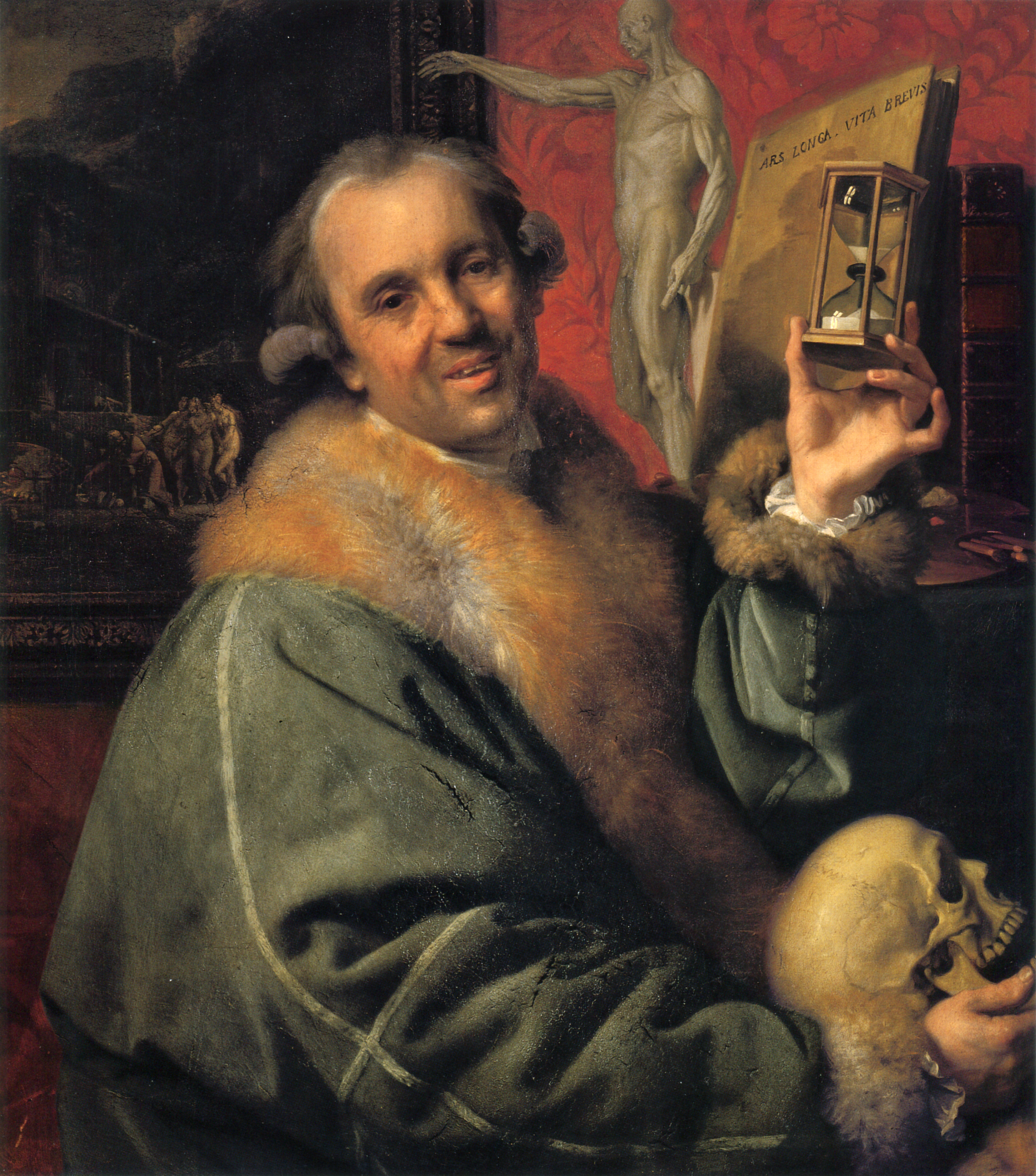
Self-portrait c. 1776

Despite the high-profile the artist enjoyed in his day, as court painter in London and Vienna, Zoffany has, until very recently, been overlooked by art historical literature. In 1920, Lady Victoria Manners and Dr. G. C. Williamson published John Zoffany, R.A., his life and works. 1735–1810 – the first in-depth study of the artist and his work, privately printed, presumably at some cost (with 330pp, numerous black/white and a few colour plates), in a limited edition of 500 copies.

In 1966, Oliver Millar published Zoffany and his Tribuna on the painter's Uffizi group-portrait now in the Royal Collection. This was followed by Johan Zoffany, 1733–1810, an illustrated guide for the exhibition at the National Portrait Gallery, London in 1977. In December 2009, Penelope Treadwell published the first full biography, Johan Zoffany: Artist and Adventurer, Paul Holberton Publishing.

This biography traces Zoffany's footsteps, from his youth in Germany, through his first years in London – working for clockmaker Stephen Rimbault – to his growing success as society and theatrical portraitist and founder-member of the Royal Academy, and following him on his Grand Tour and sojourn in India. Illustrated in full colour with more than 250 works by Zoffany and his peers, many of which are in private collections, Treadwell's biography provides a timely reassessment of the artist's life and work.

In 2011 Mary Webster published her long-awaited and splendidly produced monograph on the artist: Johan Zoffany 1733–1810 (Yale University Press). In 2011–12 the Yale Center for British Art and the Royal Academy, London, showed an exhibition Johan Zoffany, RA: Society Observed, curated by Martin Postle, with Gillian Forrester and MaryAnne Stevens, with a catalogue of the same name, edited by Postle and including much original research. For a review of this and Mary Webster's biography, see Edward Chaney, "Intentional Phallacies", The Art Newspaper, no. 234, April 2012, p. 71.

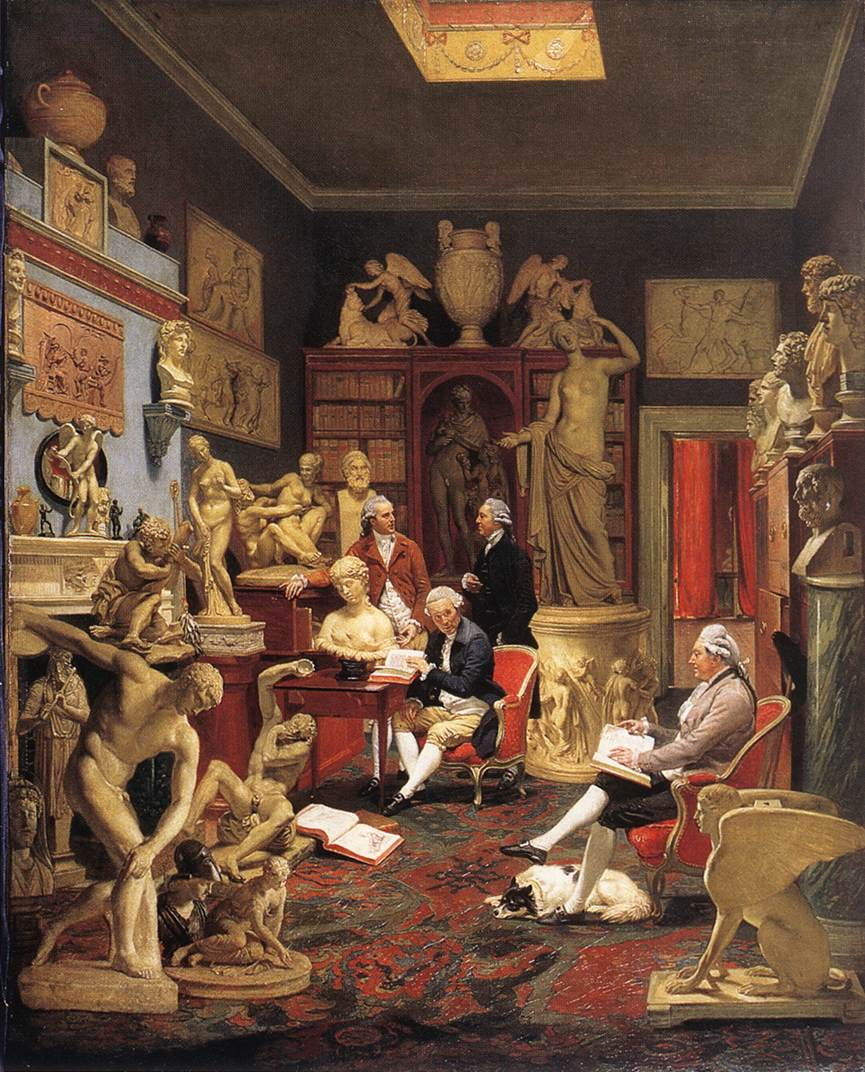
Charles Townley in His Sculpture Gallery (1782), Towneley Park collection

A 2014 book by David Wilson describes Zoffany's relationship with Robert Sayer (1725–94). A leading publisher and seller of prints, maps and maritime charts in Georgian Britain, based in Fleet Street, London, Sayer organised the engraving of paintings by some leading artists of the day, most importantly Zoffany, and sold prints from the engravings. In this way he helped to secure Zoffany's international reputation. Sayer and the artist became longstanding friends as well as business associates. In 1781 Zoffany painted Robert Sayer in an important 'conversation piece'. The Sayer Family of Richmond depicts Robert Sayer, his son, James, from his first marriage, and his second wife, Alice Longfield (née Tilson).

Behind the family group is the substantial villa on Richmond Hill overlooking the River Thames, built for Sayer between 1777 and 1780 to the designs of William Eves, a little known architect and property developer. On Sayer's death in 1794 the house was to become the residence of a future king of Great Britain.

In recent decades, Zoffany's paintings have provoked significant controversy. Mary Webster's monumental study in 2011, while based on extensive research, has sometimes been seen as austere. Other scholars have drawn attention to the artist's propensity for wry observations, risqué allusions and double meanings, so that many of his paintings conceal as much as they reveal.

== In literature and media ==
In the comic opera The Pirates of Penzance, by Gilbert and Sullivan, the Major-General brags of being able to distinguish works by Raphael from works by Gerard Dou and Zoffany.

A scene in Stanley Kubrick's film Barry Lyndon (1975) is said to have been inspired by Zoffany's Tribuna of the Uffizi.

Zoffany Street in Archway, London is named after him. This street name is notable as being the last to appear in the index of London's famous street atlas, the A–Z.

== Works ==
Portraits

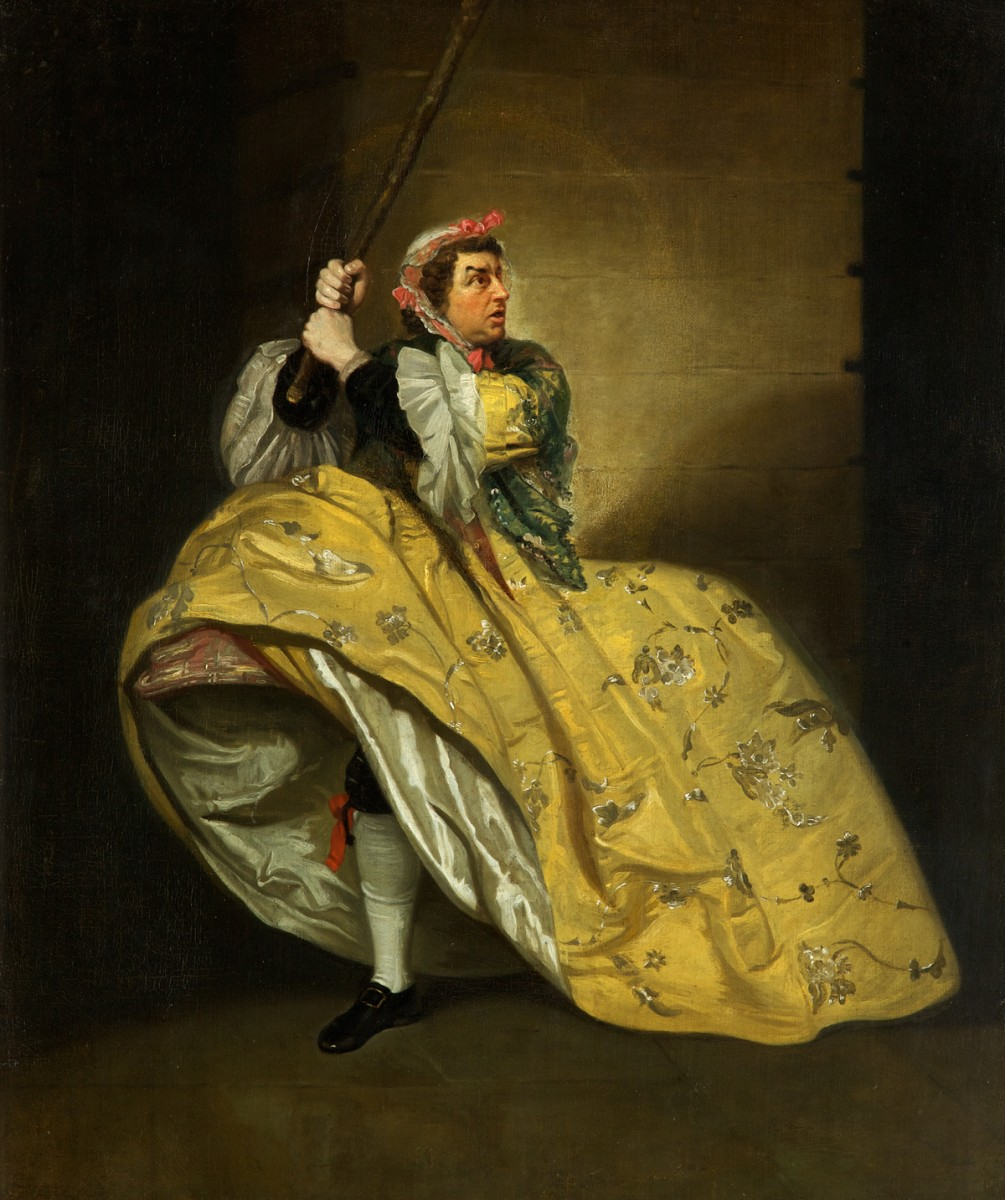
David Garrick in Vanbrugh's Provoked Wife, Theatre Royal, Drury Lane (1763)

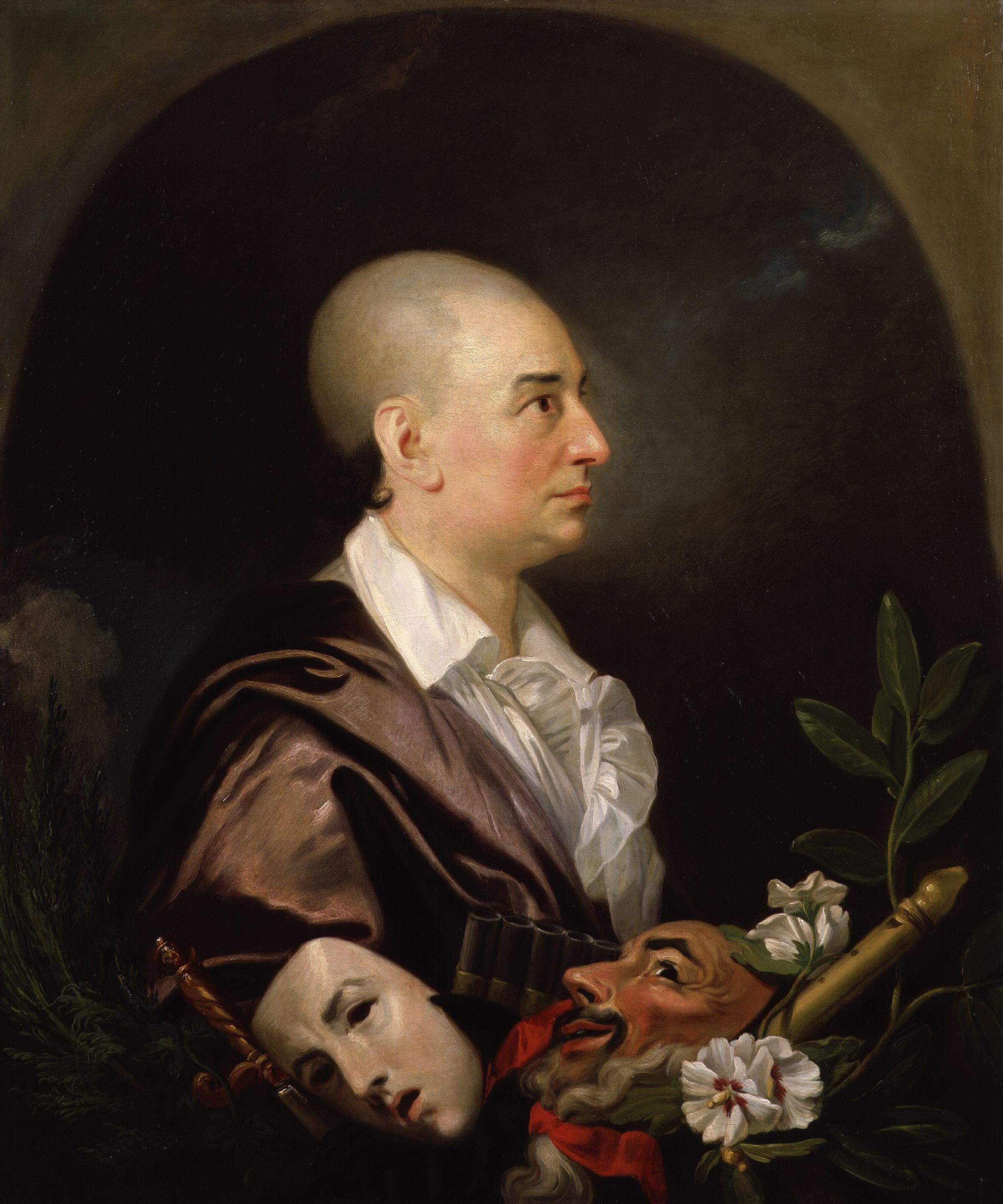
David Garrick by Johann Zoffany) (1763)

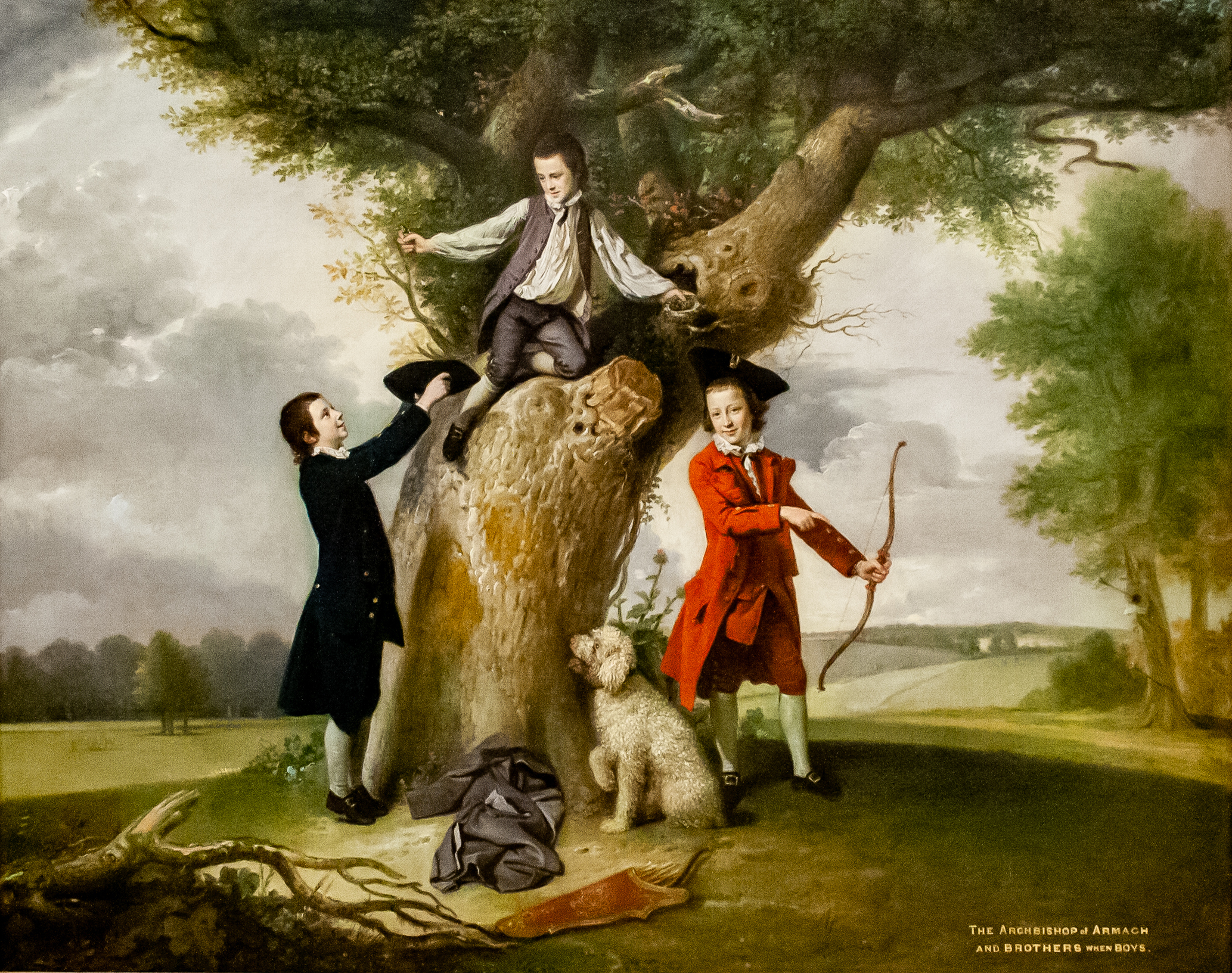
The Three Sons of the Earl of Bute, 1764

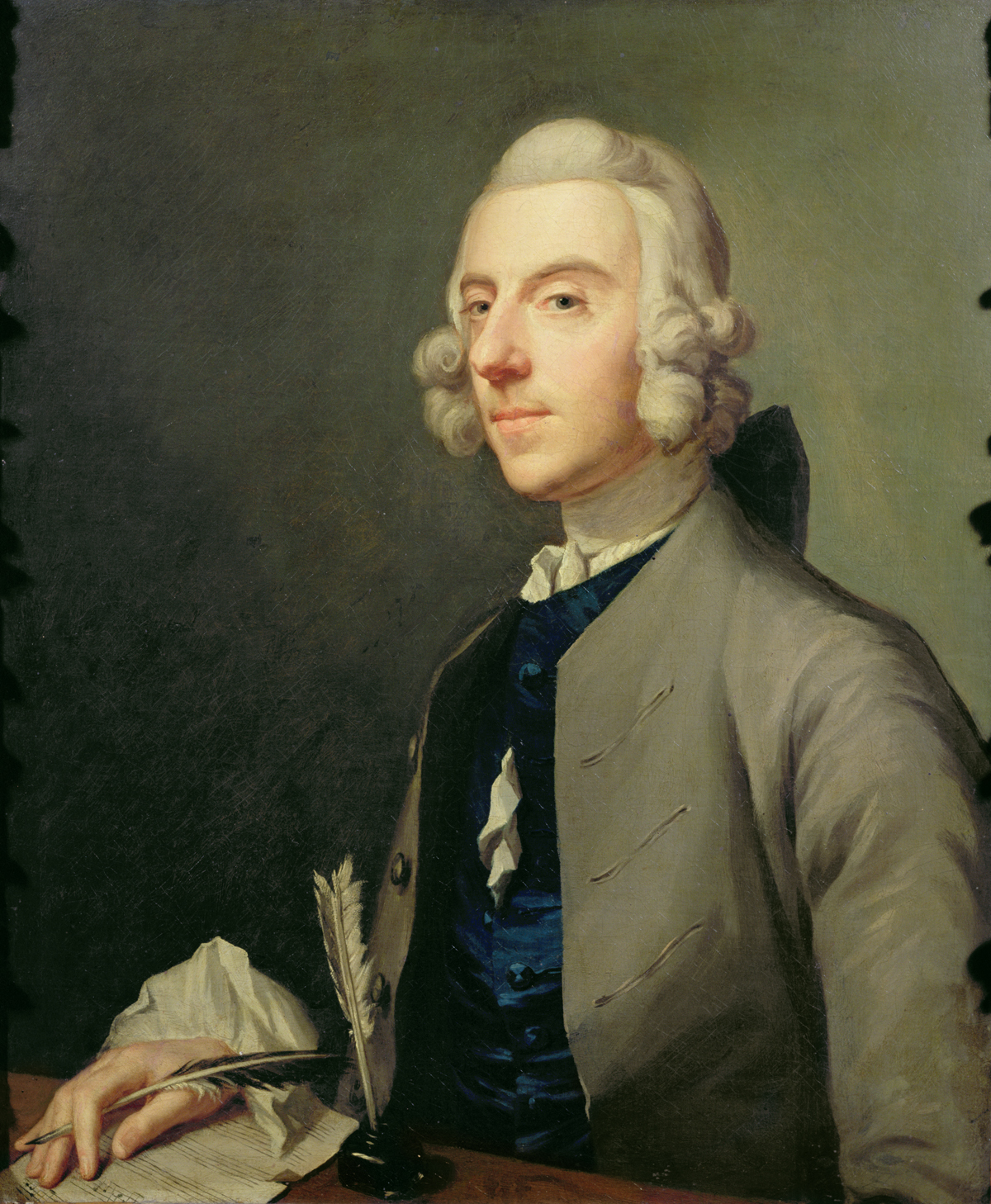
Michael Arne (1765)

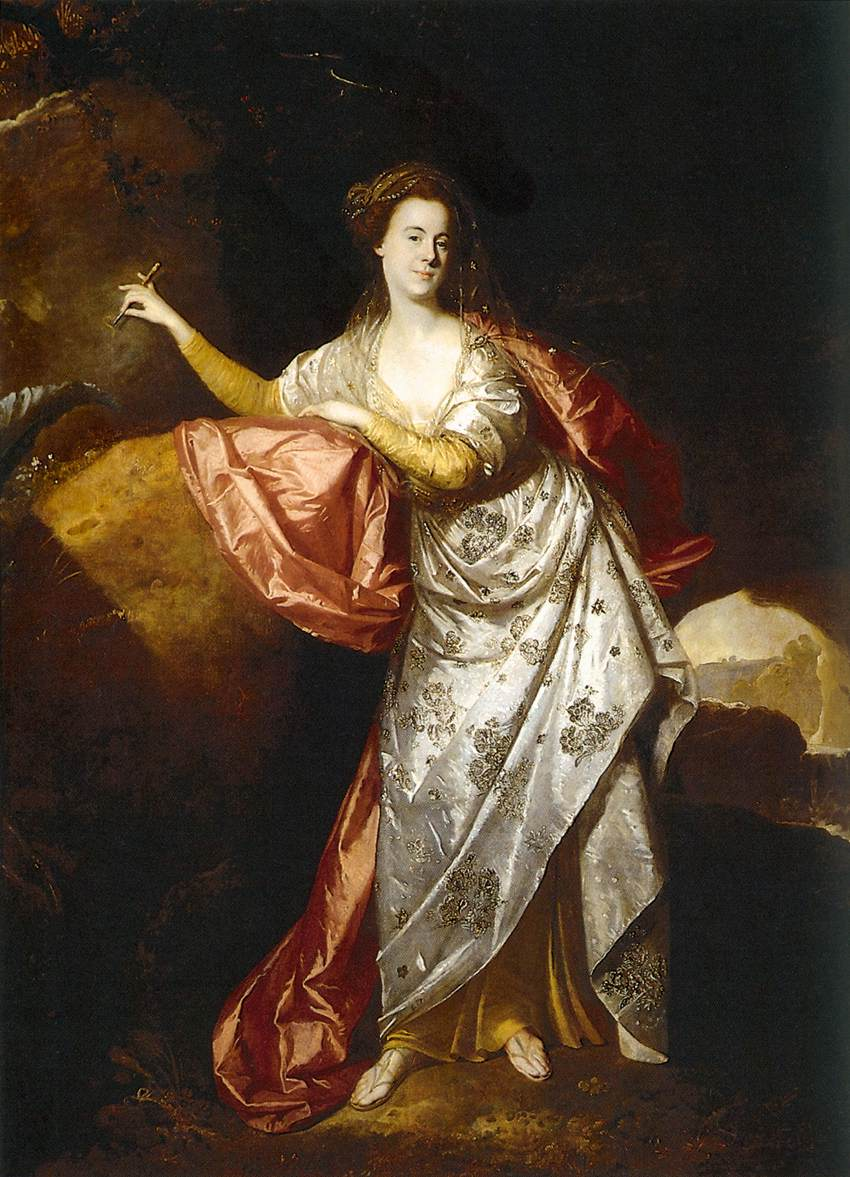
Portrait of Ann Brown in the Role of Miranda (c. 1770)

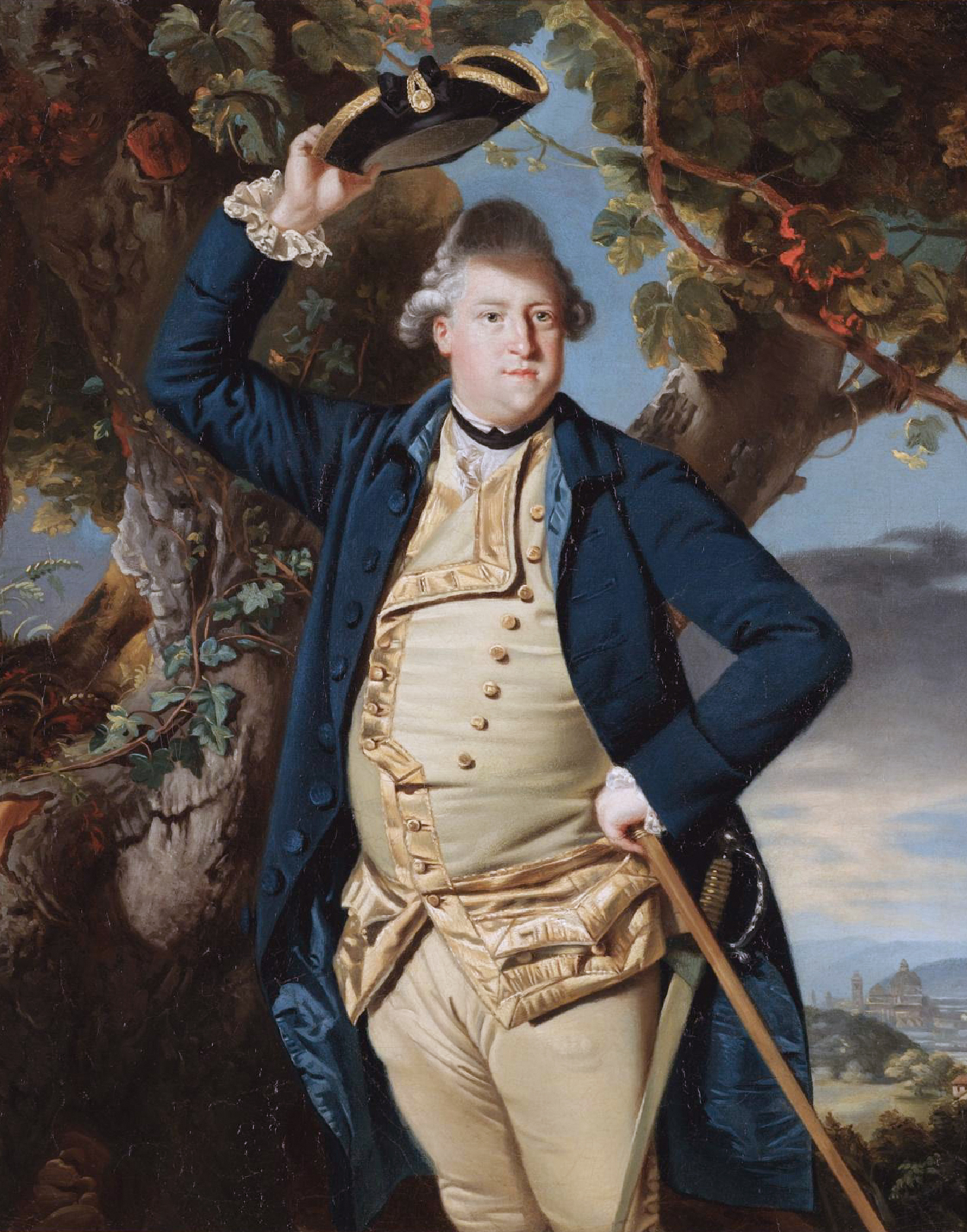
George Nassau Clavering, 3rd Earl of Cowper (1738–1789)

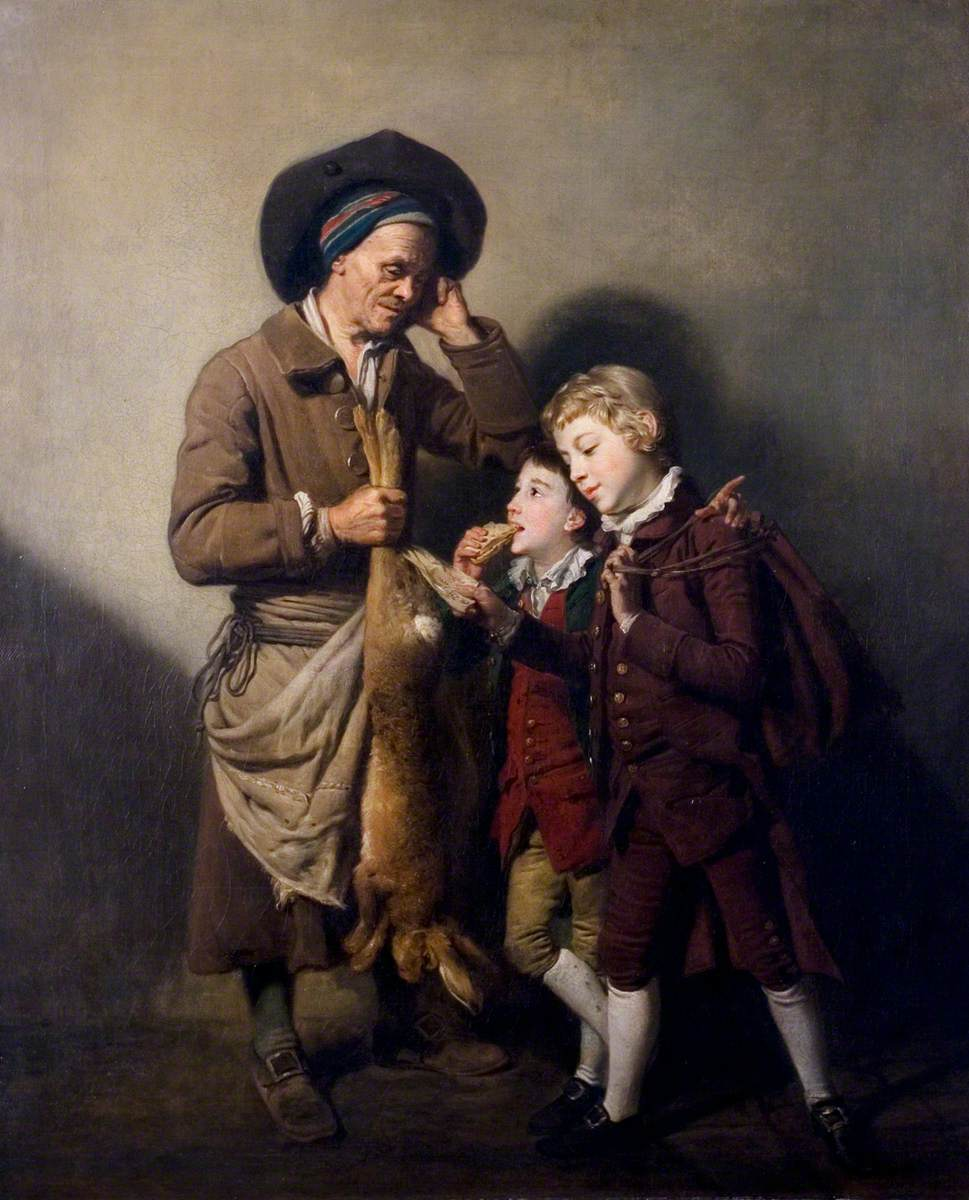
The Porter and the Hare (1768)

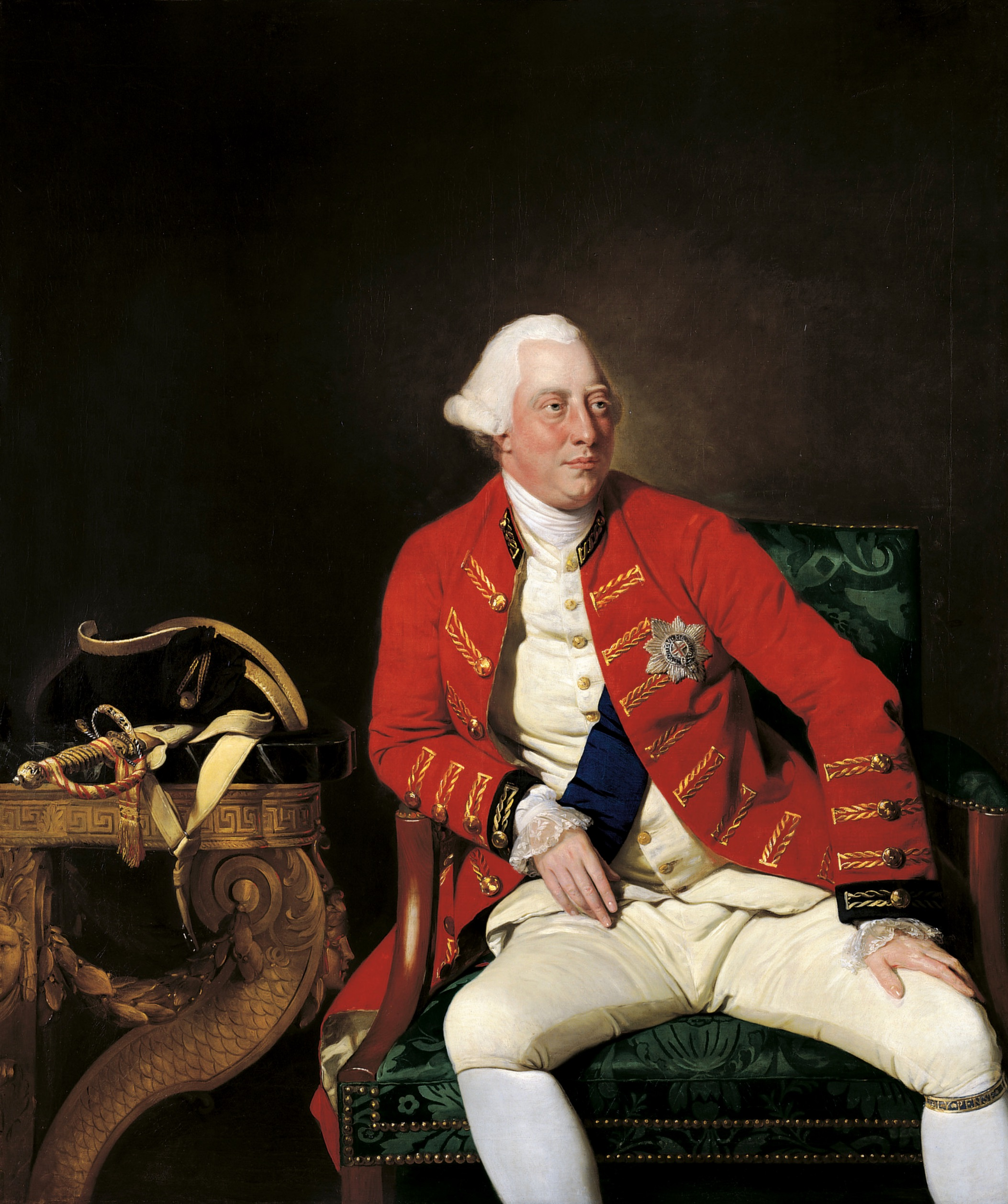
Portrait of George III (1771)

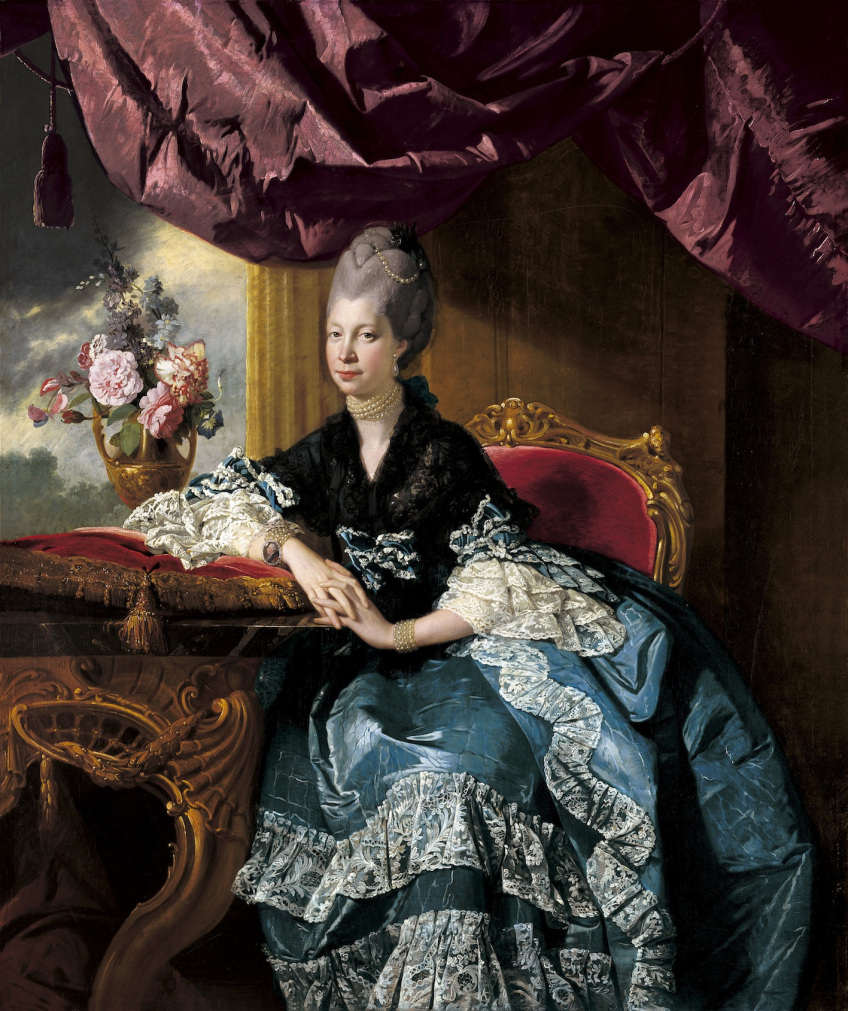
Portrait of Queen Charlotte (1771)

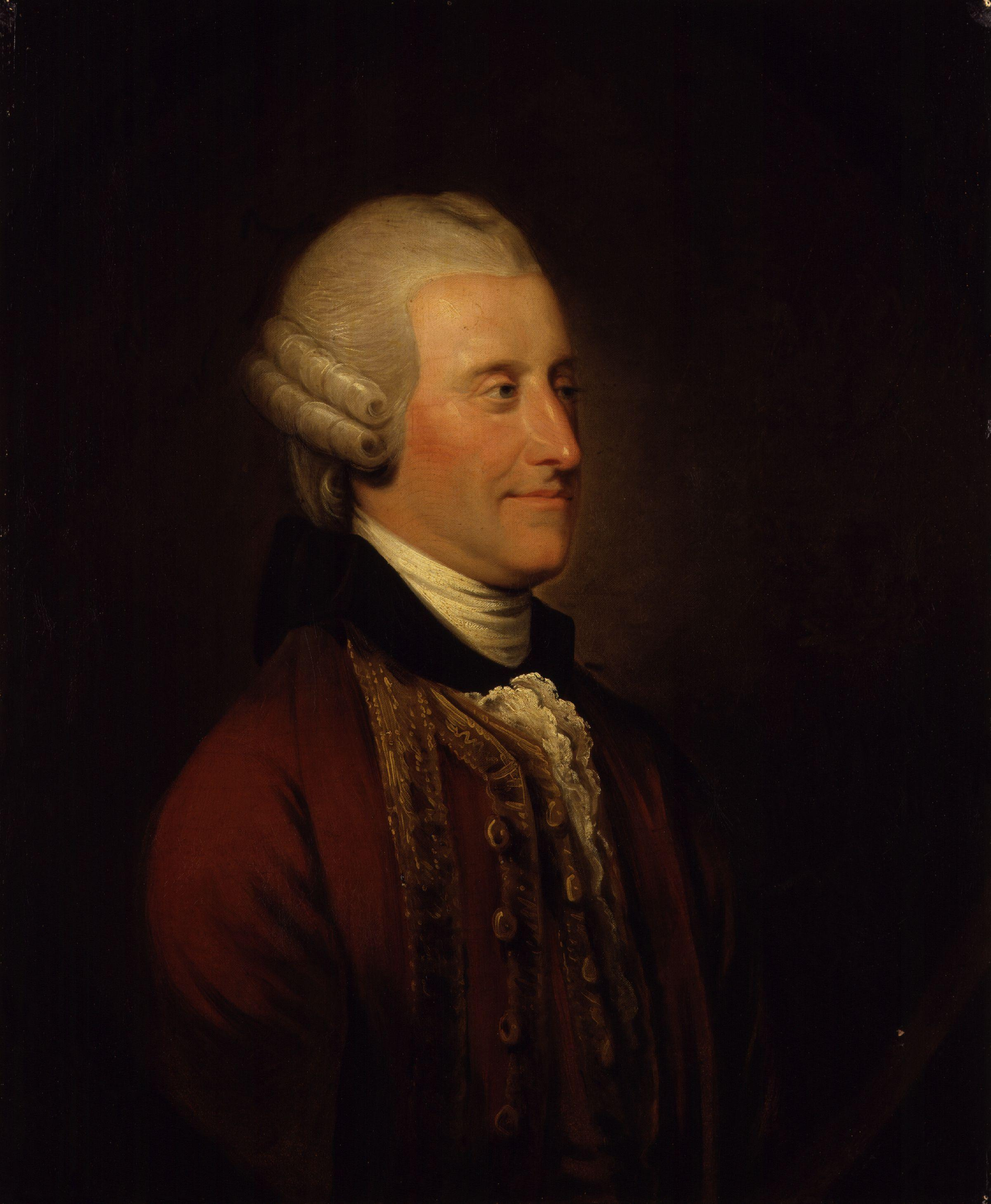
John Montagu, 4th Earl of Sandwich, best known as inventor of the sandwich.

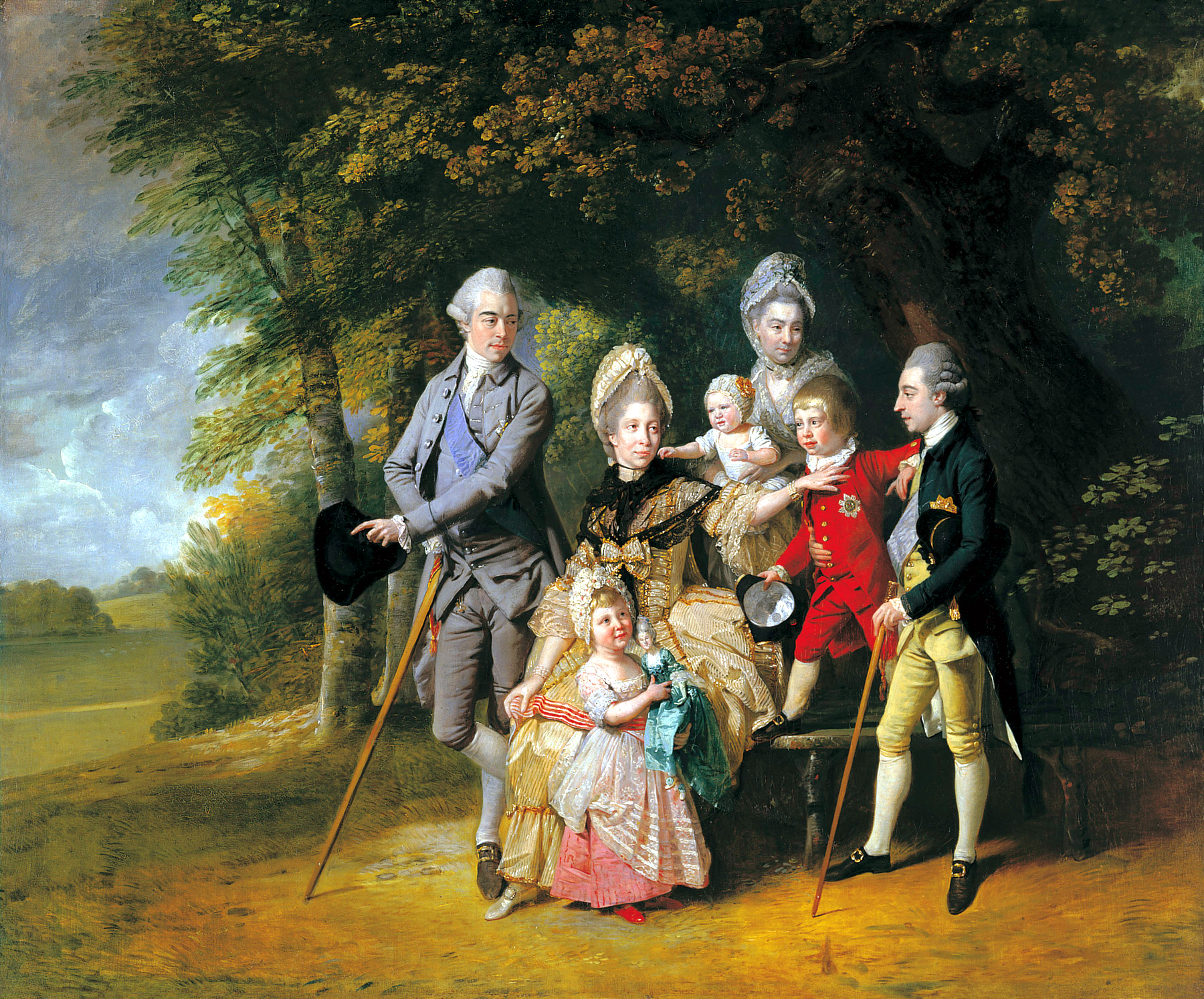
Queen Charlotte with Members of Her Family (1772)

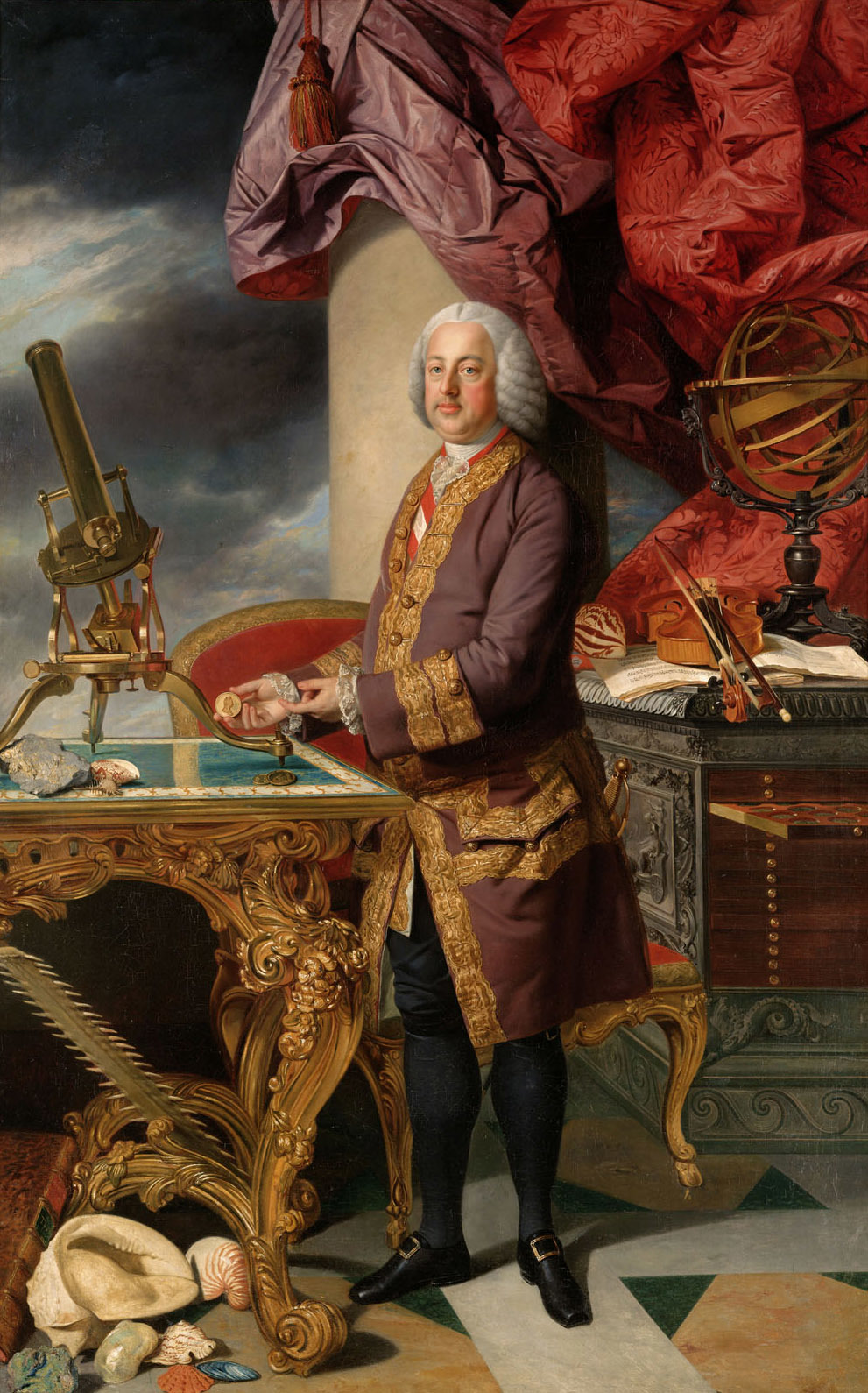
Francis I, Holy Roman Emperor

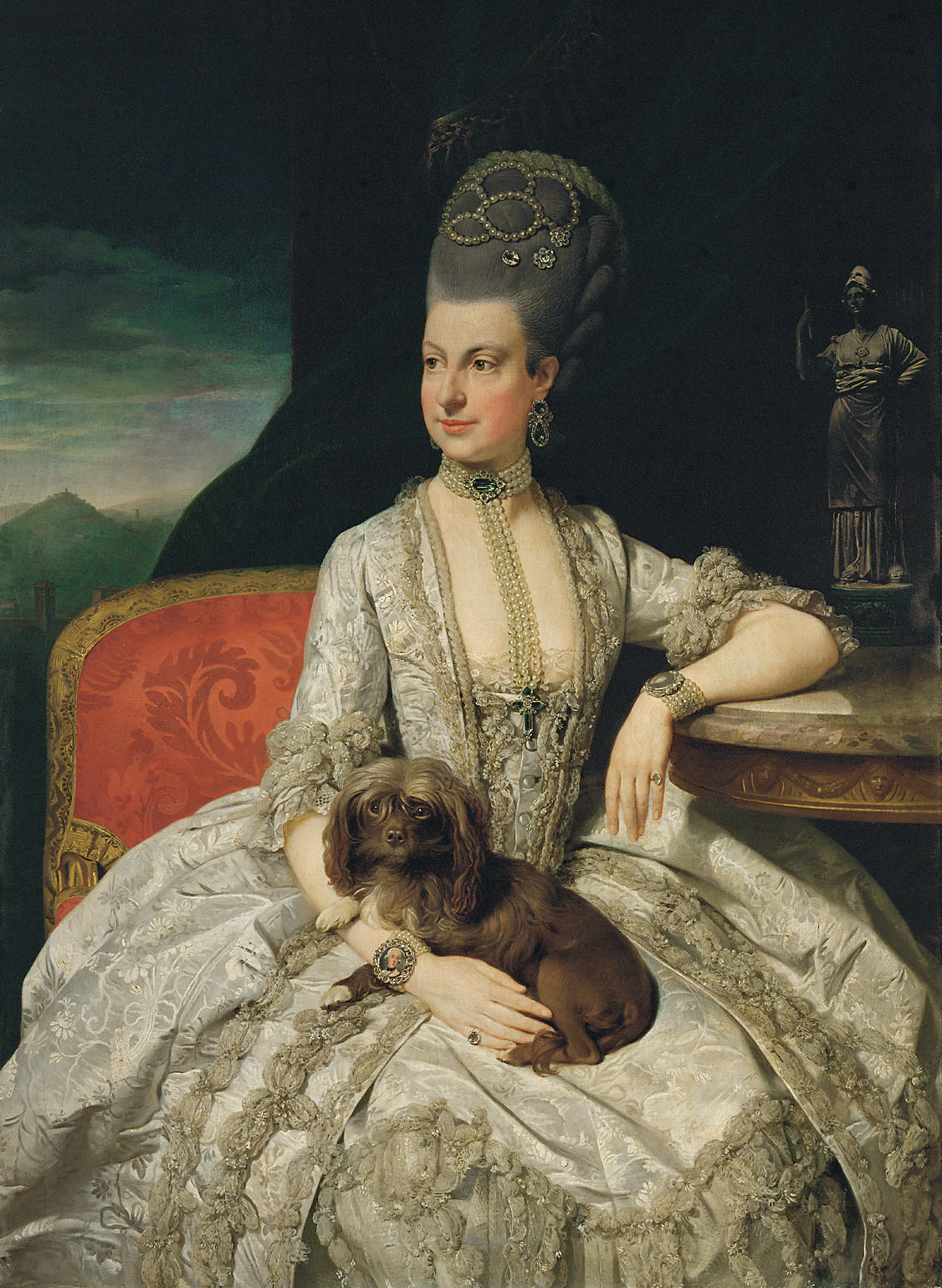
Archduchess Maria Christina, Duchess of Teschen, (1742–1798), called "Mimi", (1776)

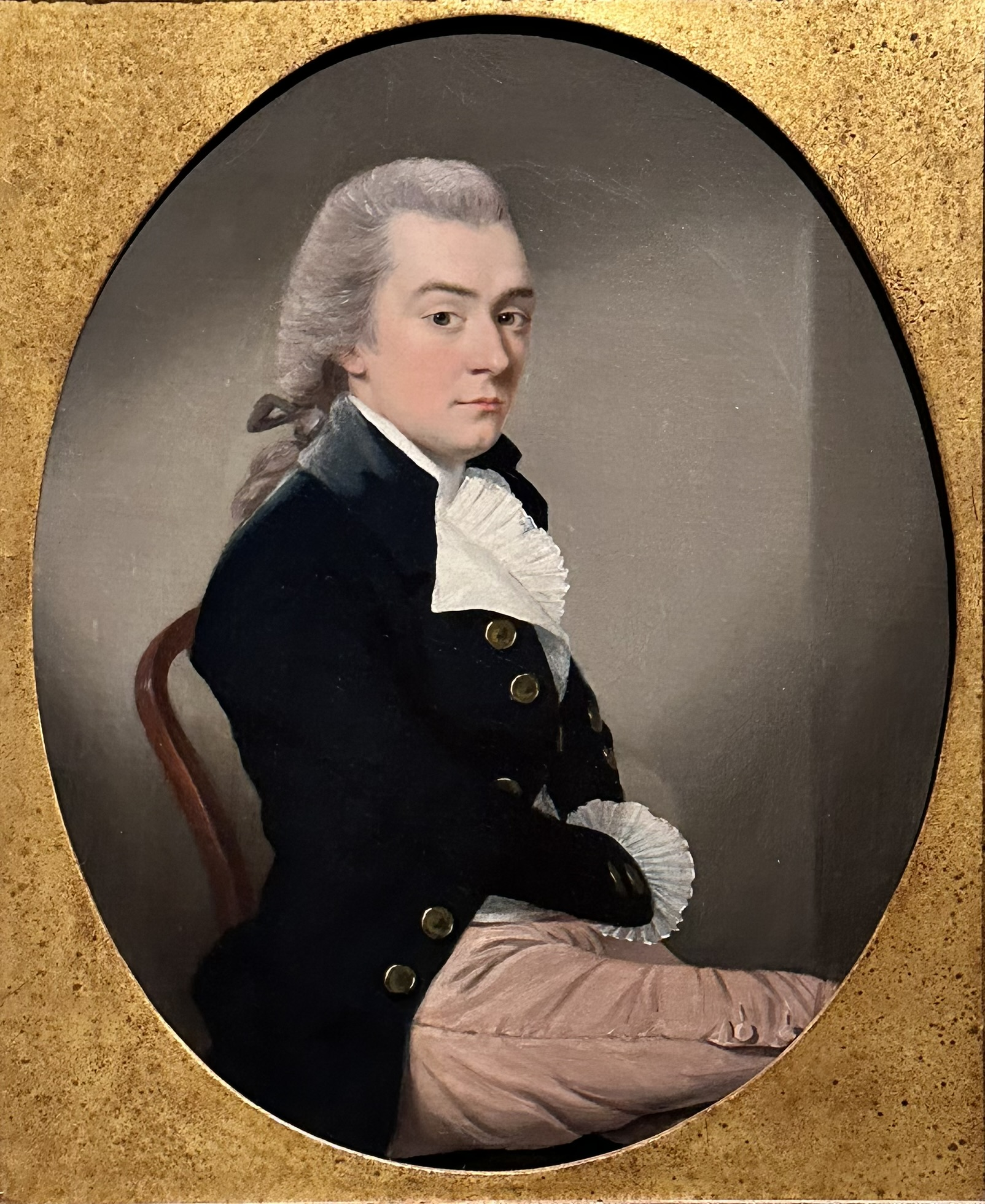
Hugh Chamberlain (1780s)

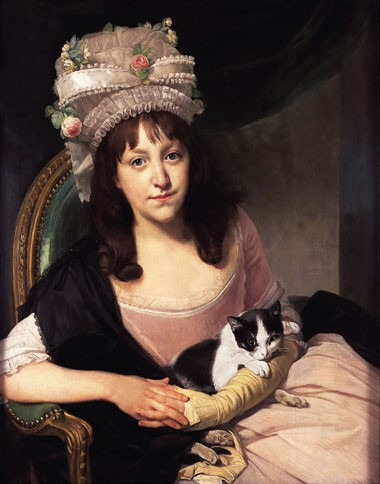
Portrait of Sophia Dumergue holding a cat (1780)
Others

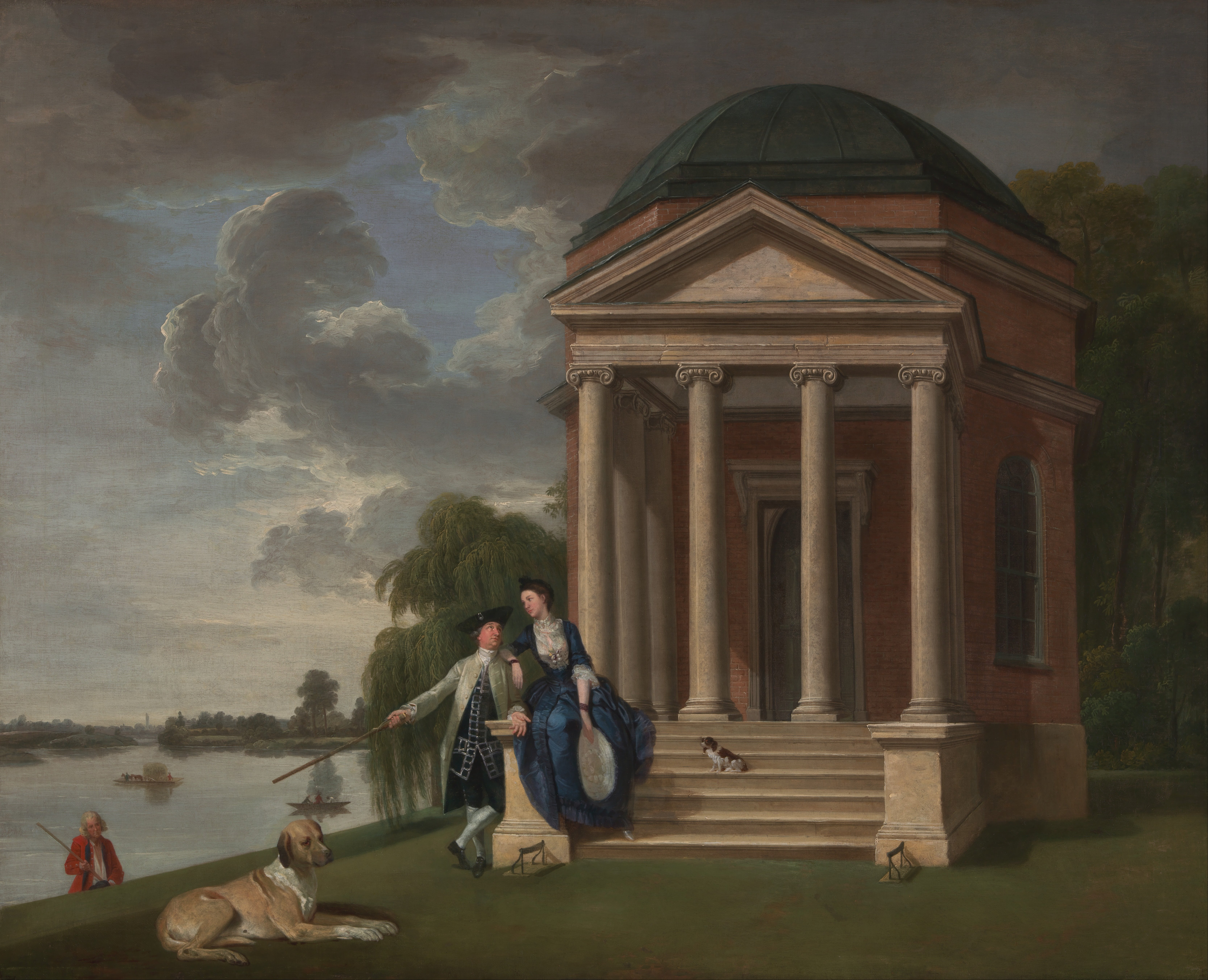
David Garrick and his Wife by his Temple to Shakespeare at Hampton (c. 1762)

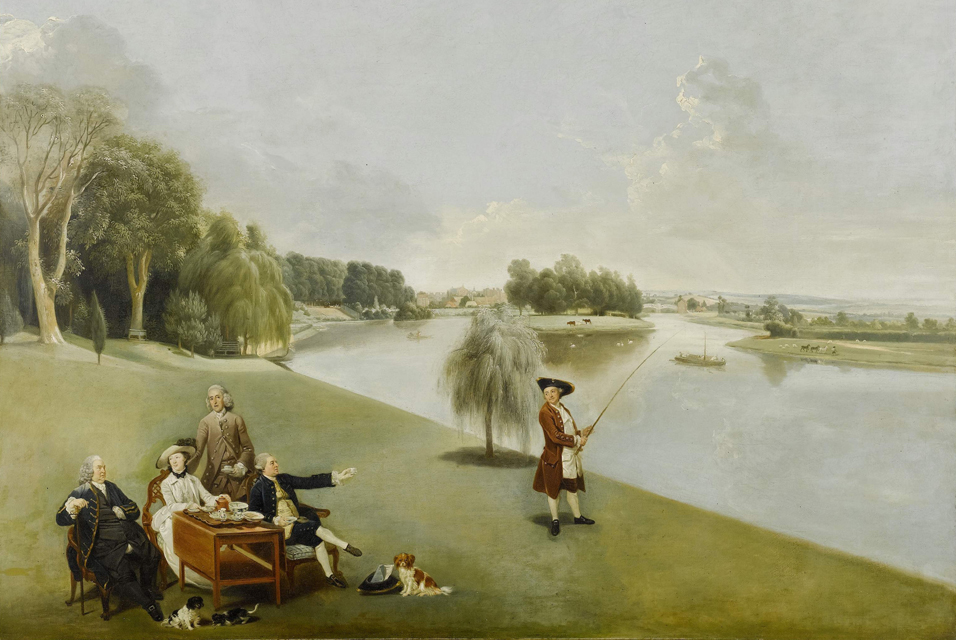
The Garden at Hampton House, with Mr and Mrs David Garrick taking tea, 1763

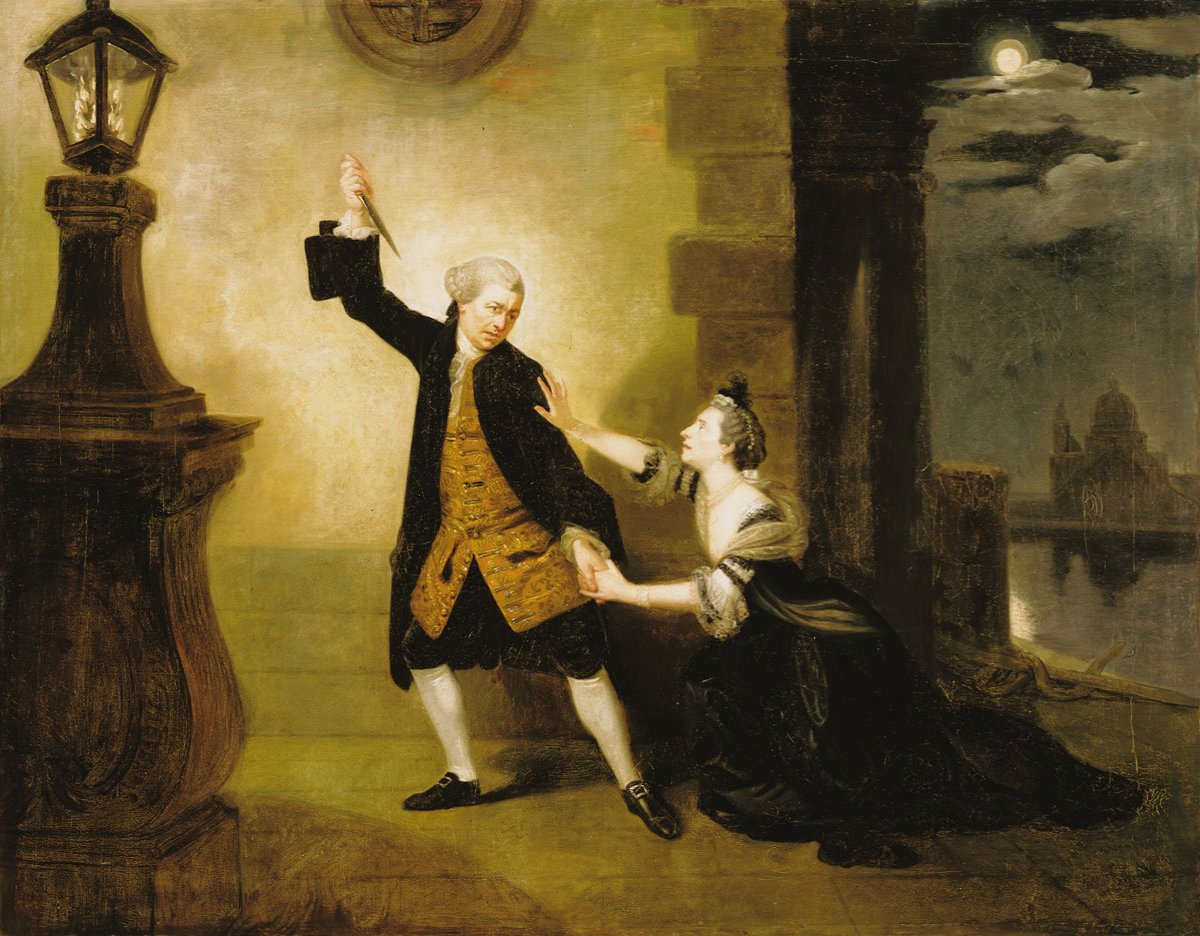
Venice Preserv'd (1763)

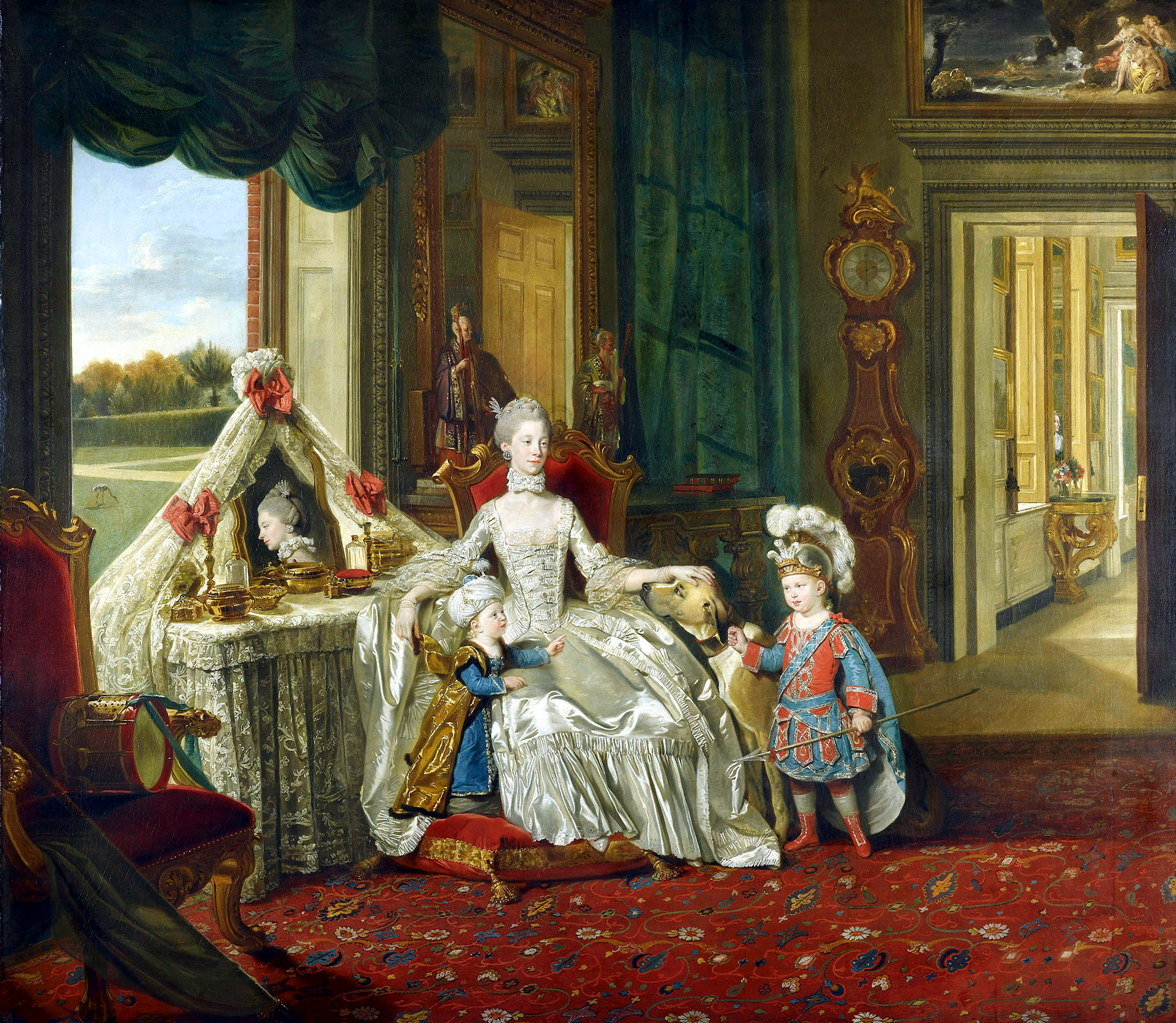
Queen Charlotte with her Two Eldest Sons (1765)

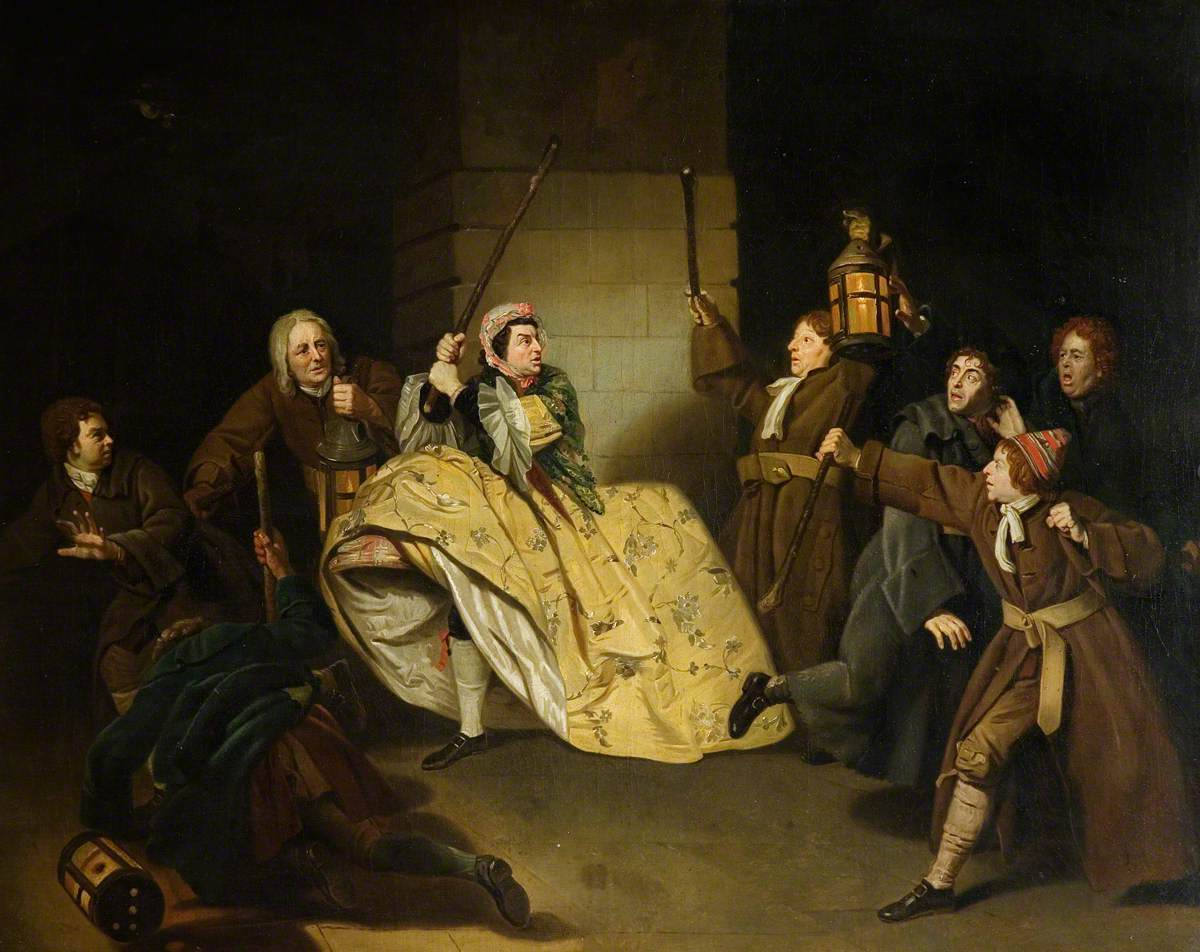
David Garrick in The Provoked Wife (1765)

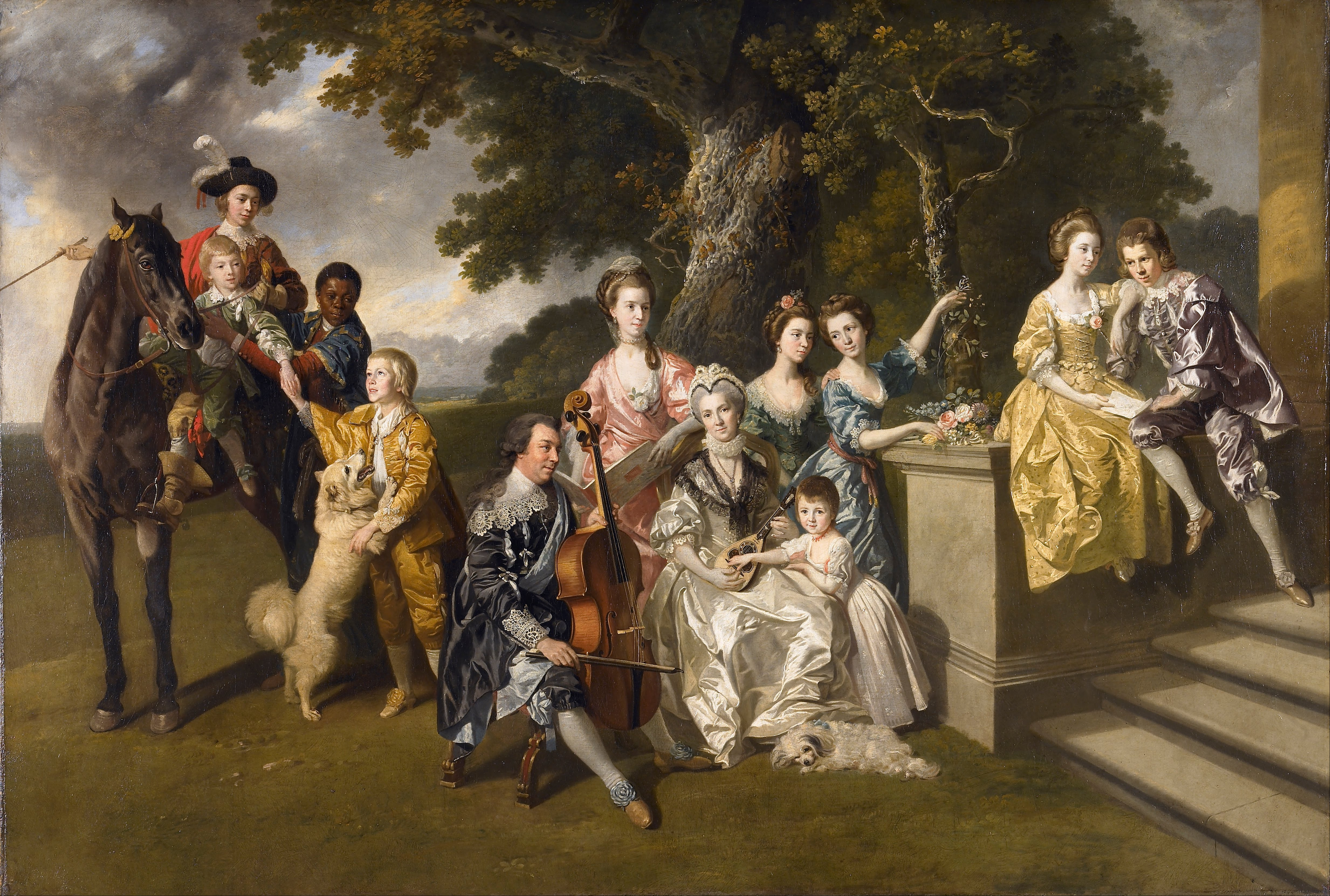
The Family of Sir William Young (c.1768)

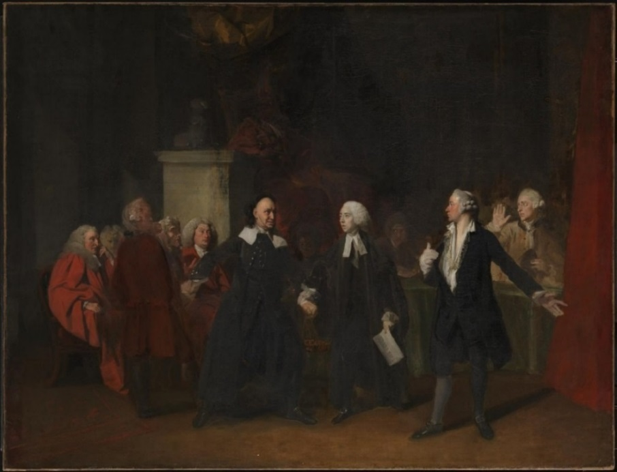
Charles Macklin as Shylock (1768)

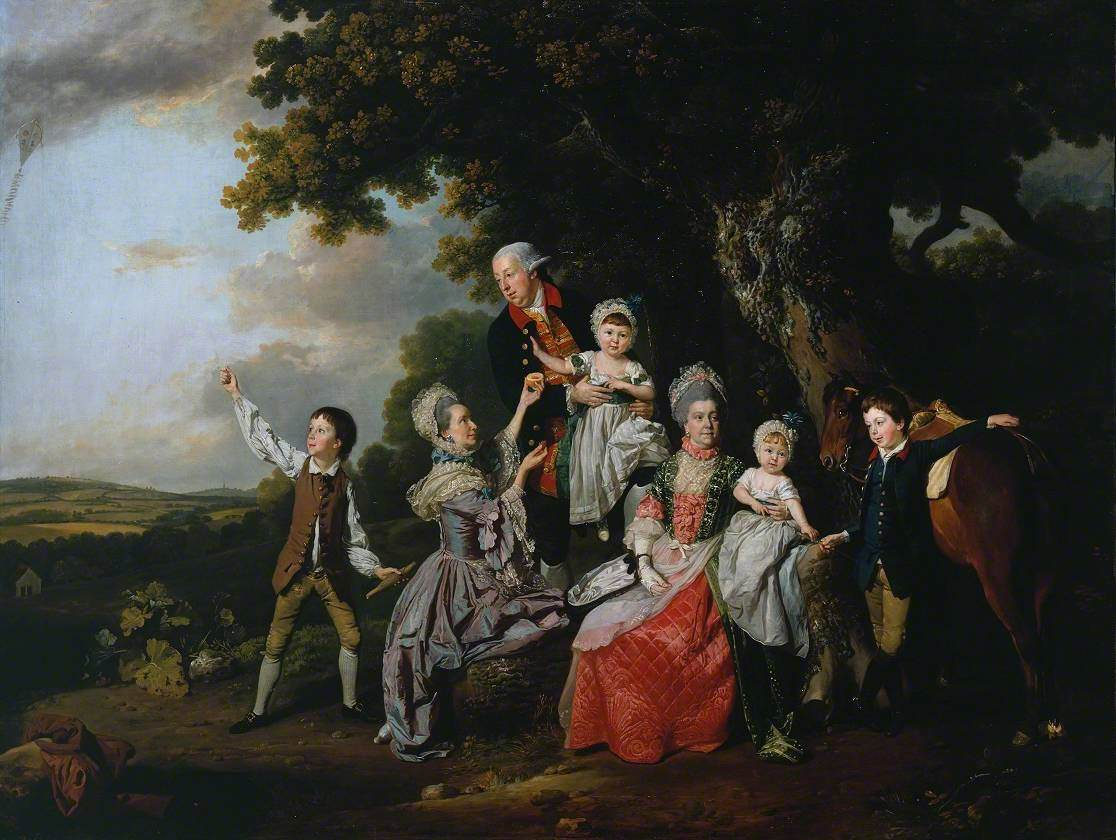
The Bradshaw Family (1769)

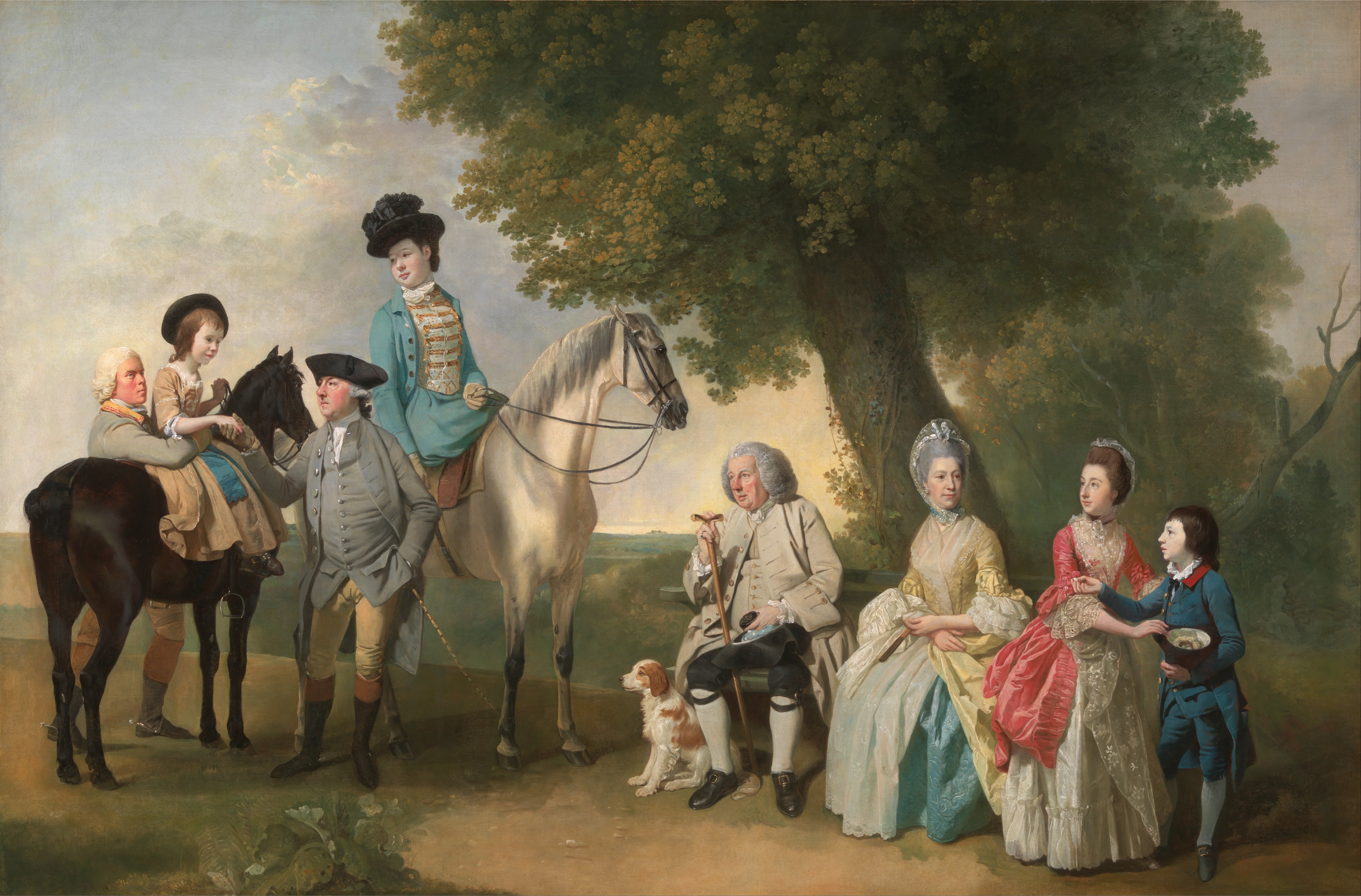
The Drummond Family (1769)

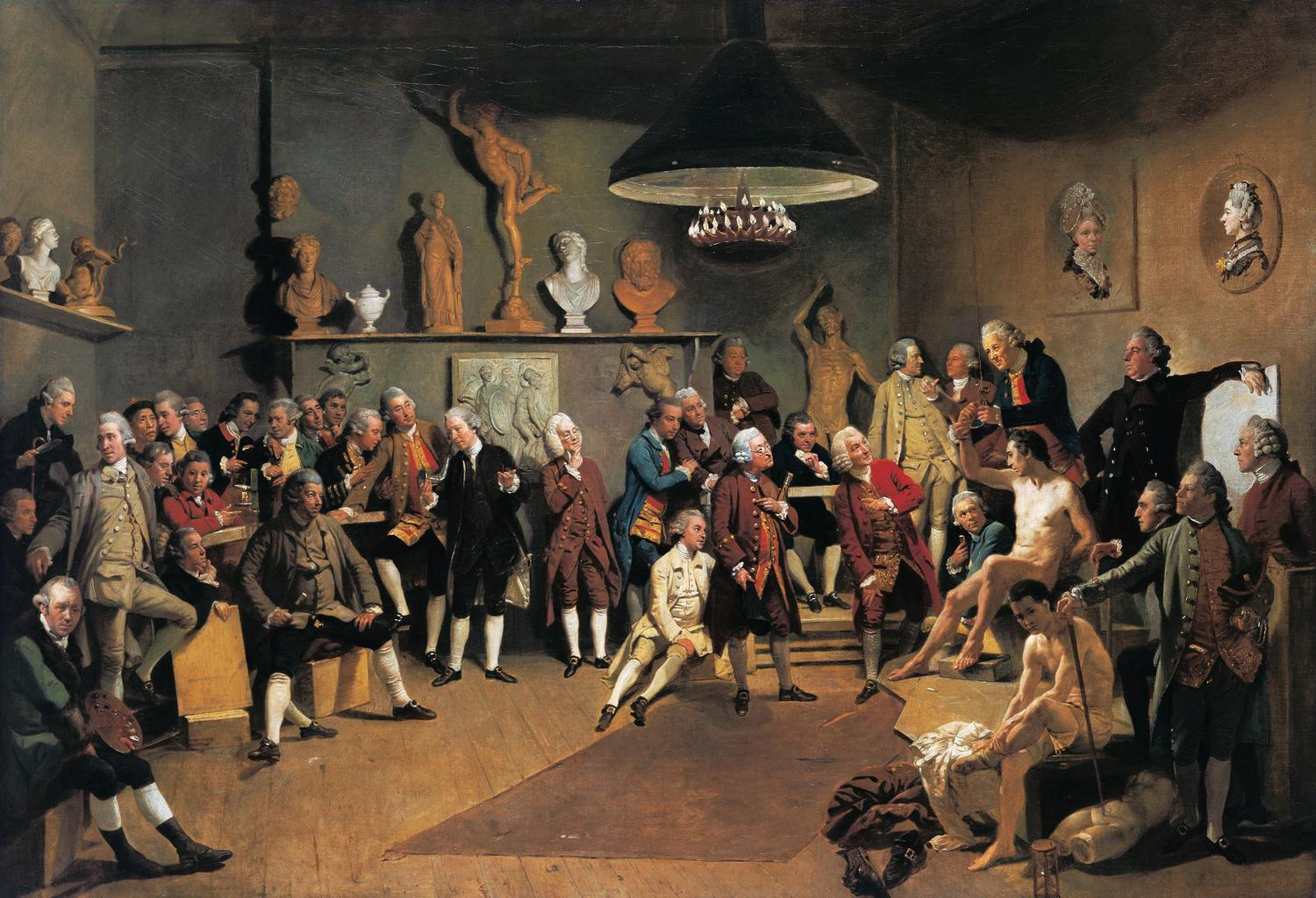
The Academicians of the Royal Academy (1771–72)

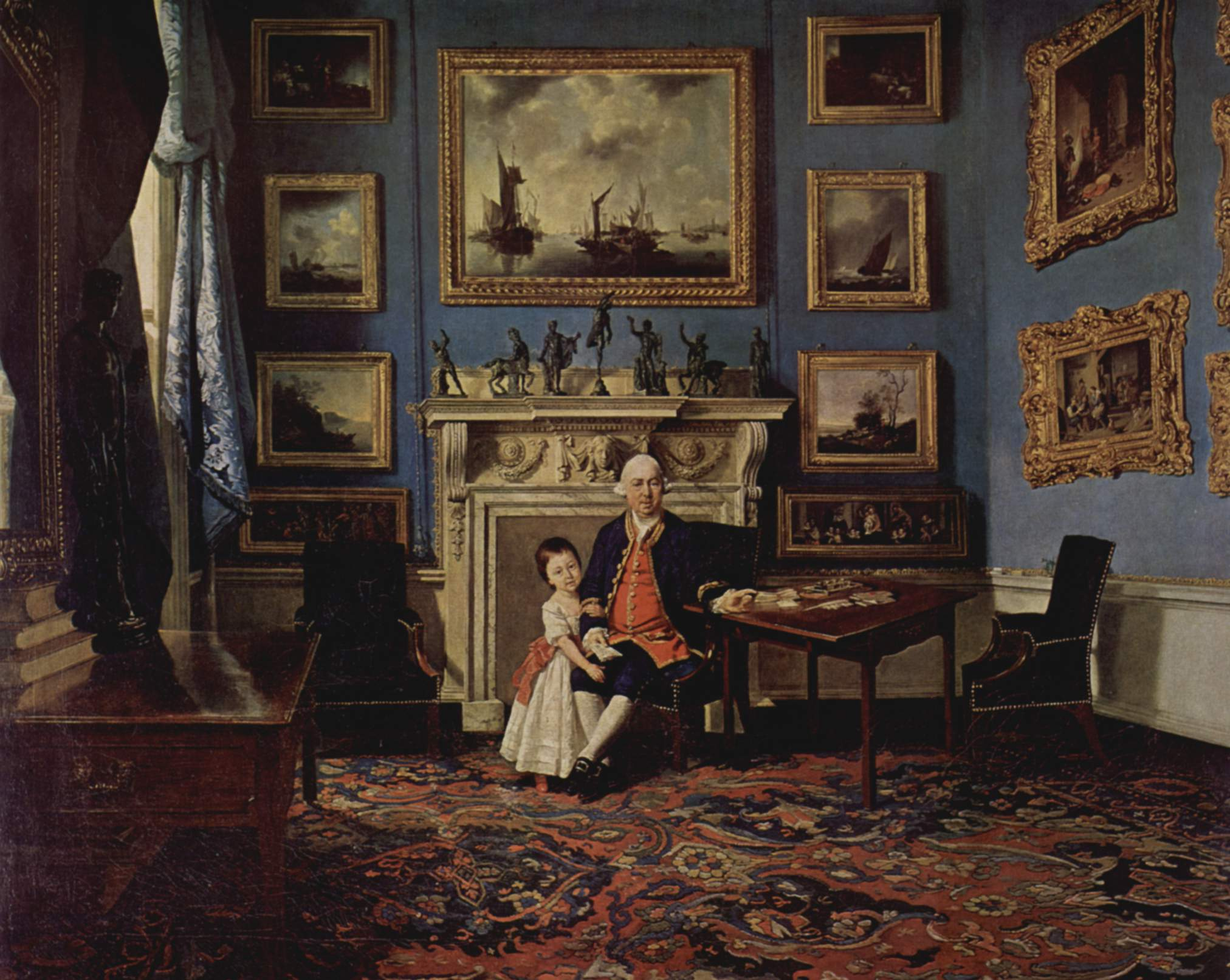
Sir Lawrence Dundas and his Grandson Lawrence (c. 1775)

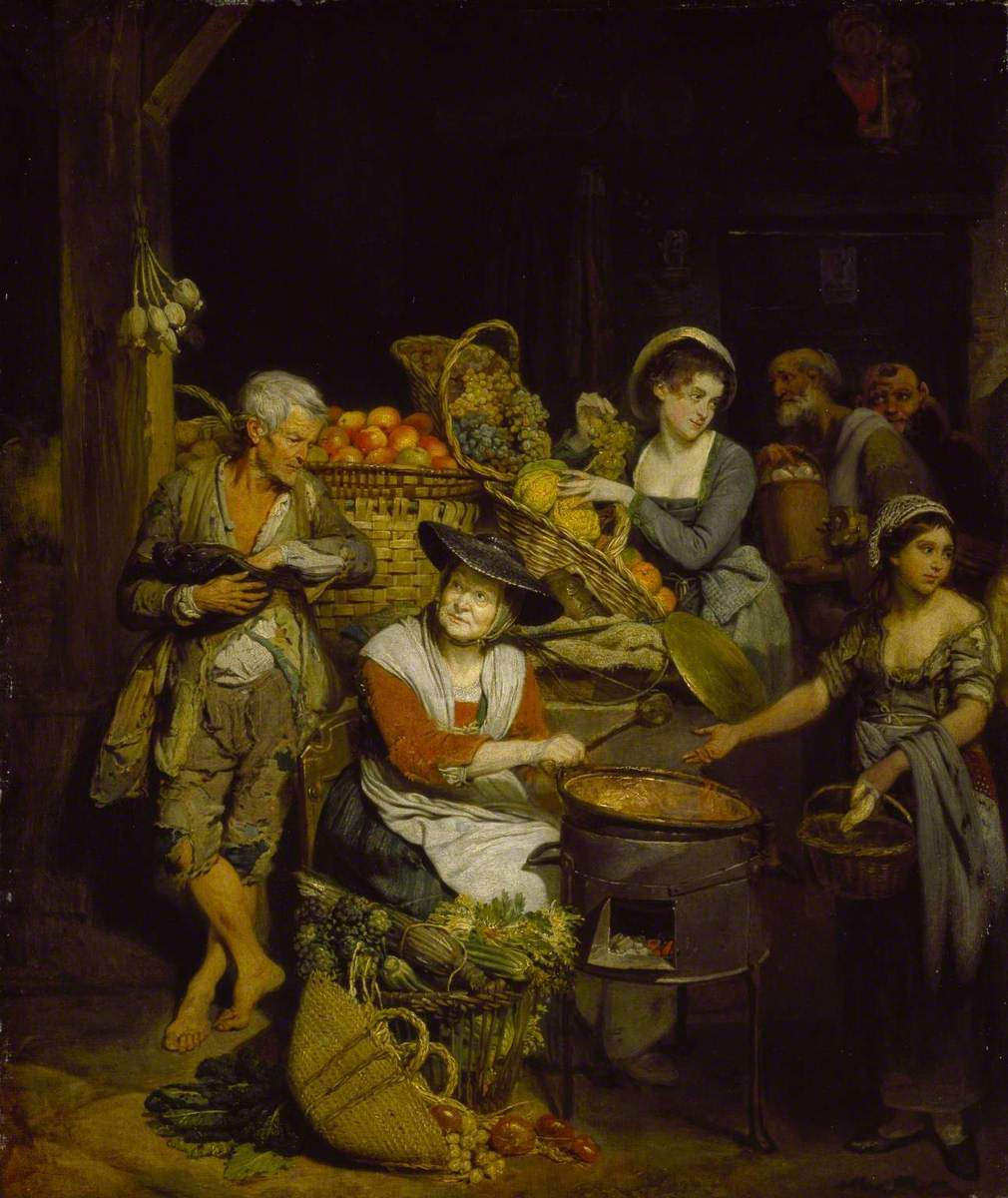
A Florentine Fruit Stall (1777)

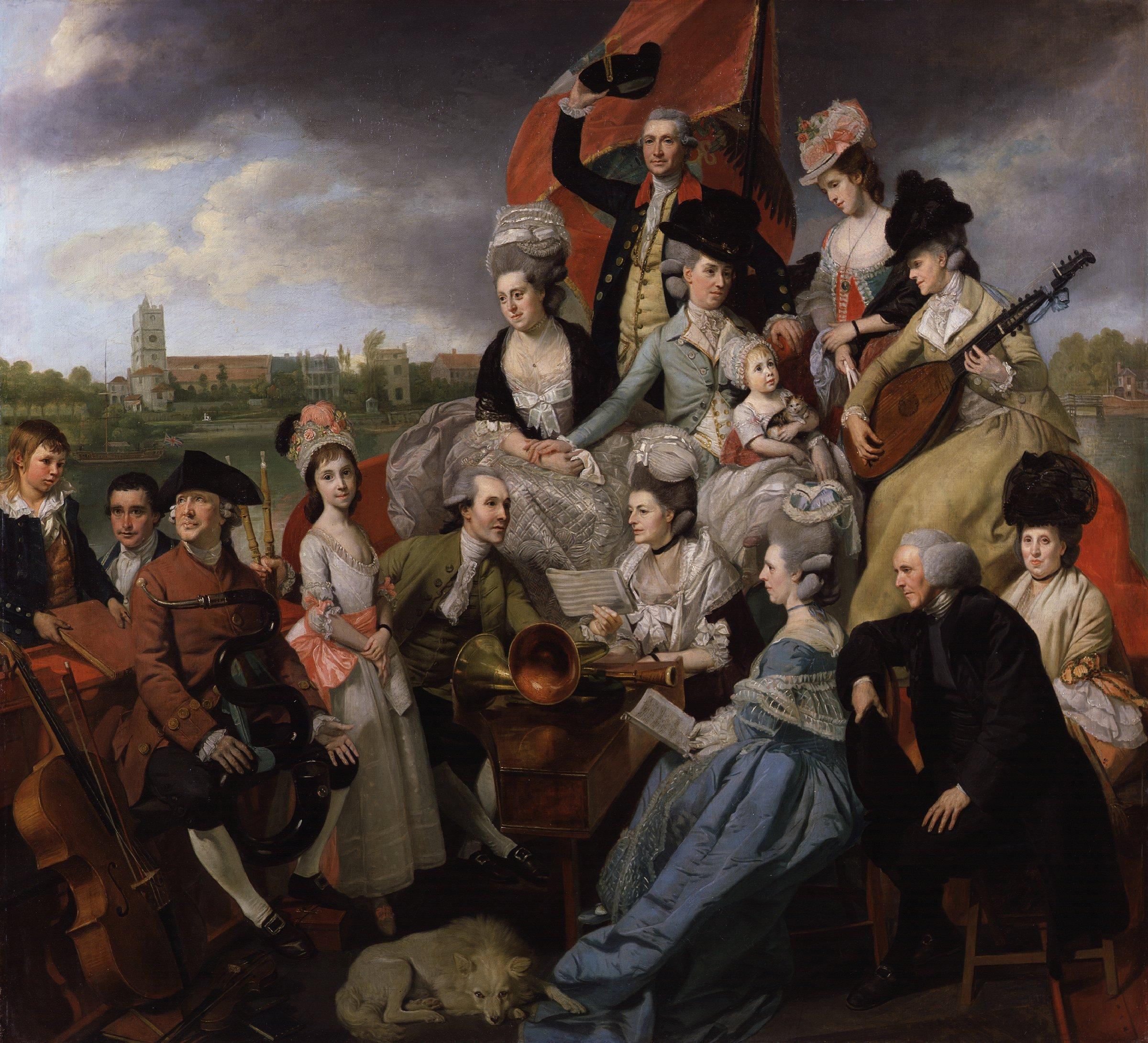
The Sharp Family (c. 1780)

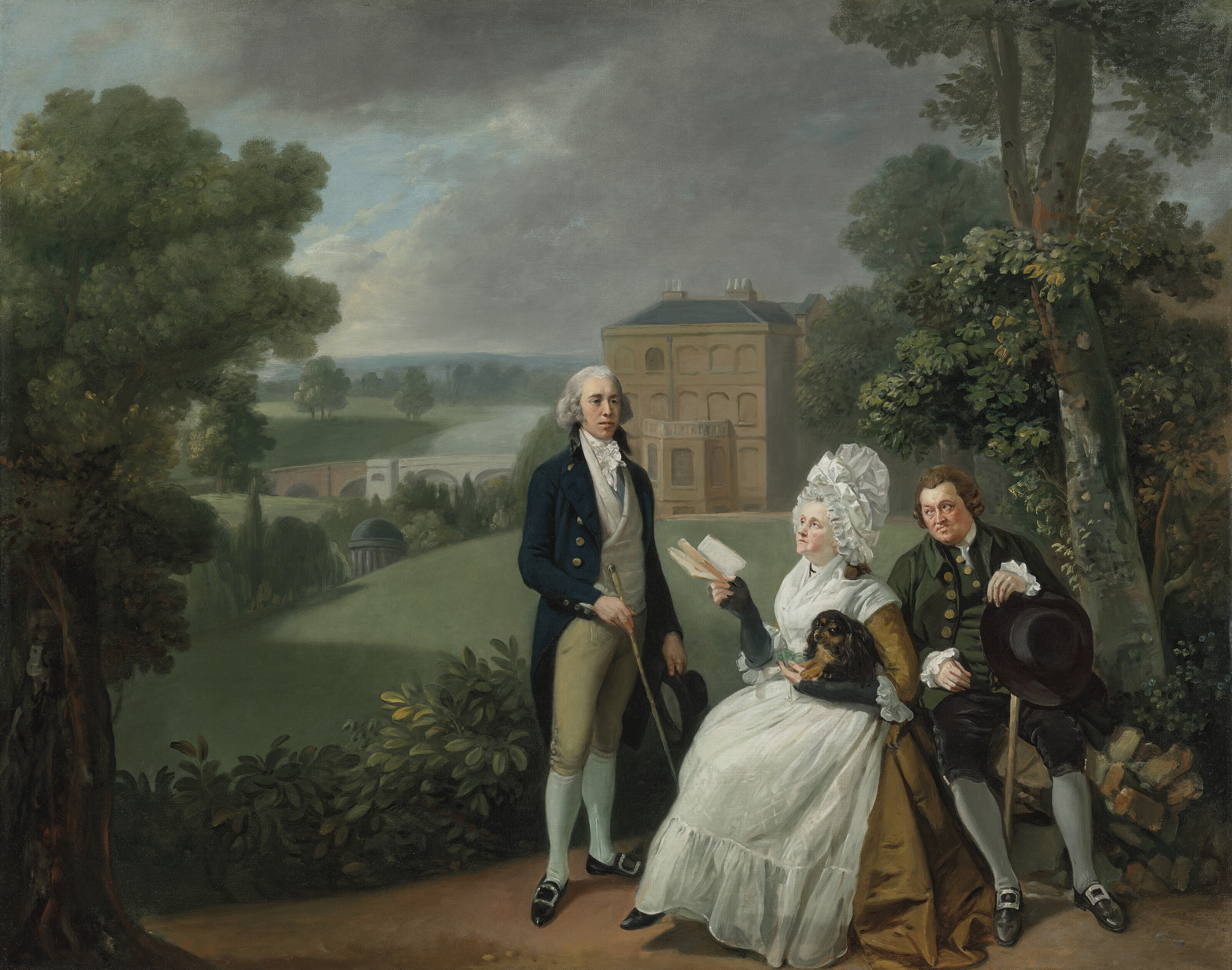
The Sayer Family of Richmond (1781)

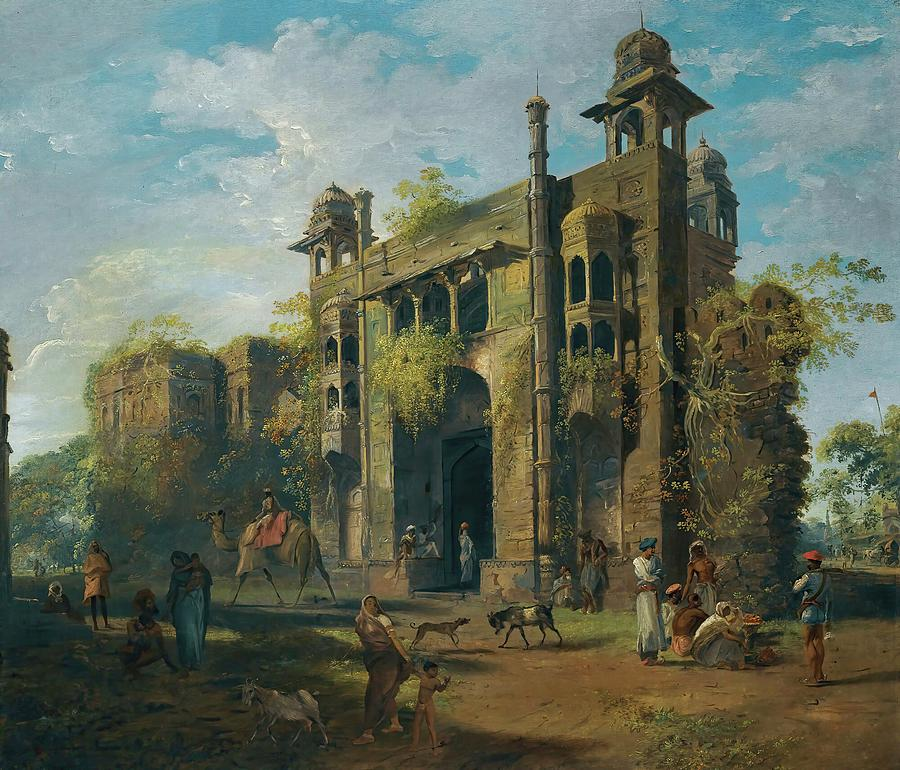
Lalbagh Fort, Dhaka (1787)

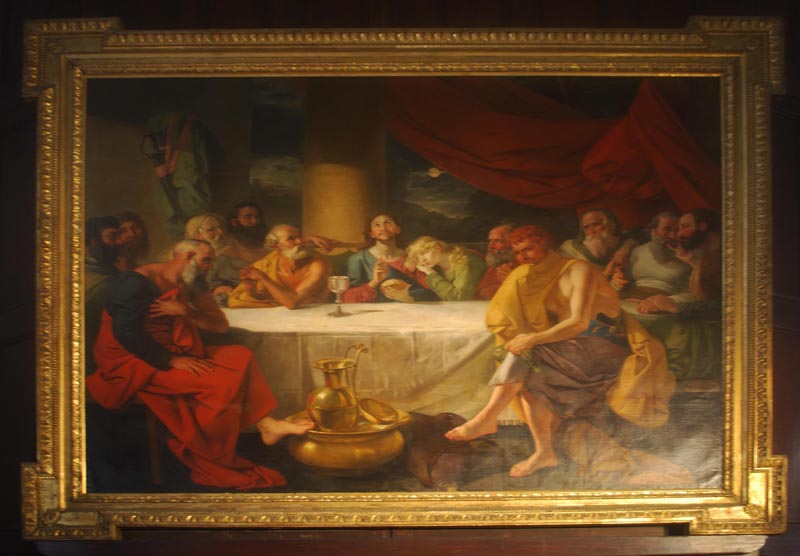
The Last Supper at the St. John's Church, Kolkata

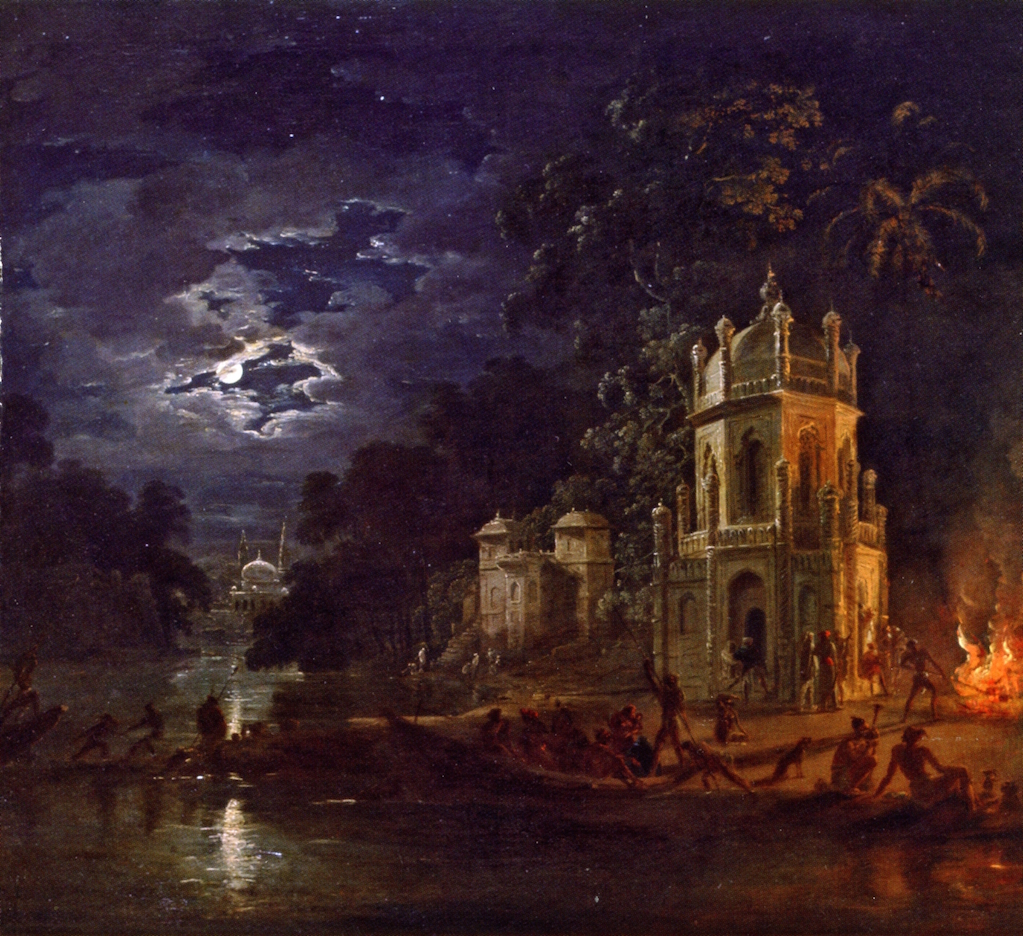
Painting titled Nagaphon Ghat: The Columbo Sahib mausoleum located in the Dhaka Christian Cemetery: 1786

Plundering the King's Cellar at Paris (1794)
