= Portrait of Queen Charlotte (Zoffany) =

Painting by Johann Zoffany

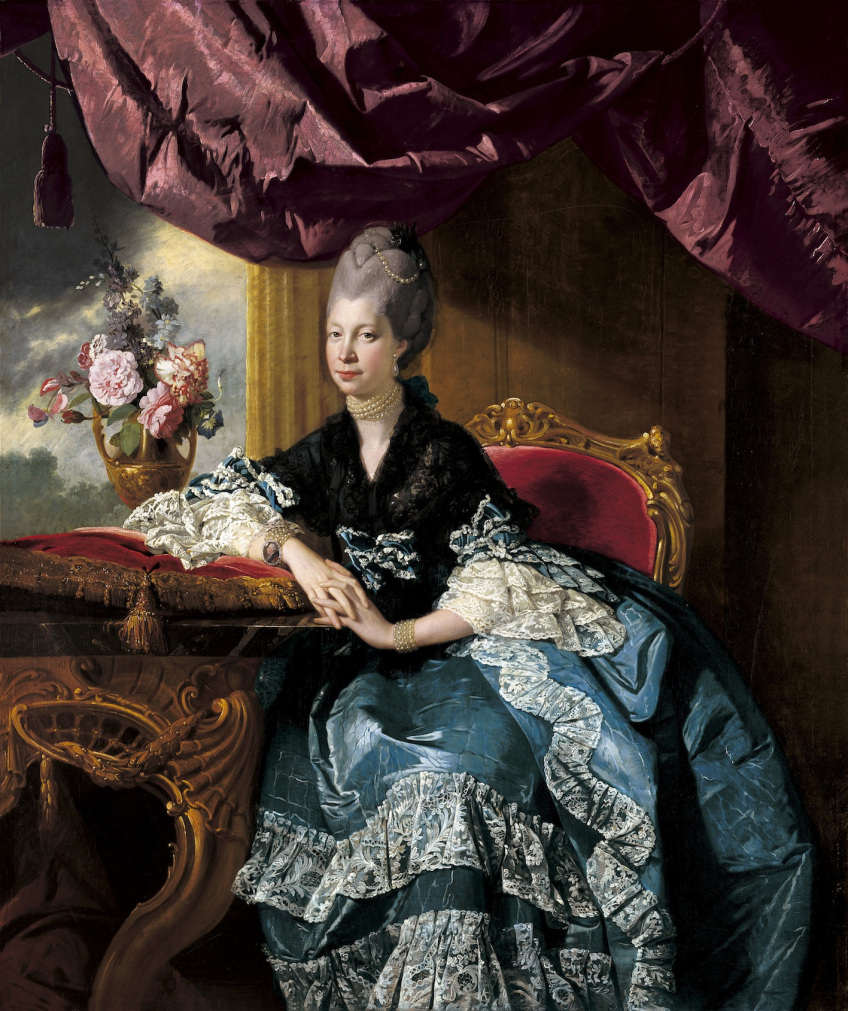
- Artist: Johan Zoffany
- Year: 1771
- Type: Oil on canvas, portrait painting
- Dimensions: 162.9 cm × 137.2 cm (64.1 in × 54.0 in)
- Location: Royal Collection; London

Portrait of Queen Charlotte is a 1771 portrait painting by the German-born British artist Johan Zoffany. It depicts Queen Charlotte, wife of the reigning British monarch George III.

Commissioned by either Charlotte or George, it was hanging in Kensington Palace in 1790 but by 1819 had shifted to the Dining Room at Buckingham Palace. It remains in the Royal Collection.

== Bibliography ==
- Roberts, Jane. George III and Queen Charlotte: Patronage, Collecting and Court Taste. Royal Collection, 2004.
