= 1790 in art =

Events from the year 1790 in art.

== Events ==
- April–May – Josiah Wedgwood shows off his first reproductions of the Portland Vase, in jasperware.
- 28 April – The Royal Academy Exhibition of 1790 opens at Somerset House and is noted for the emergence of the young portrait painter Thomas Lawrence

== Works ==
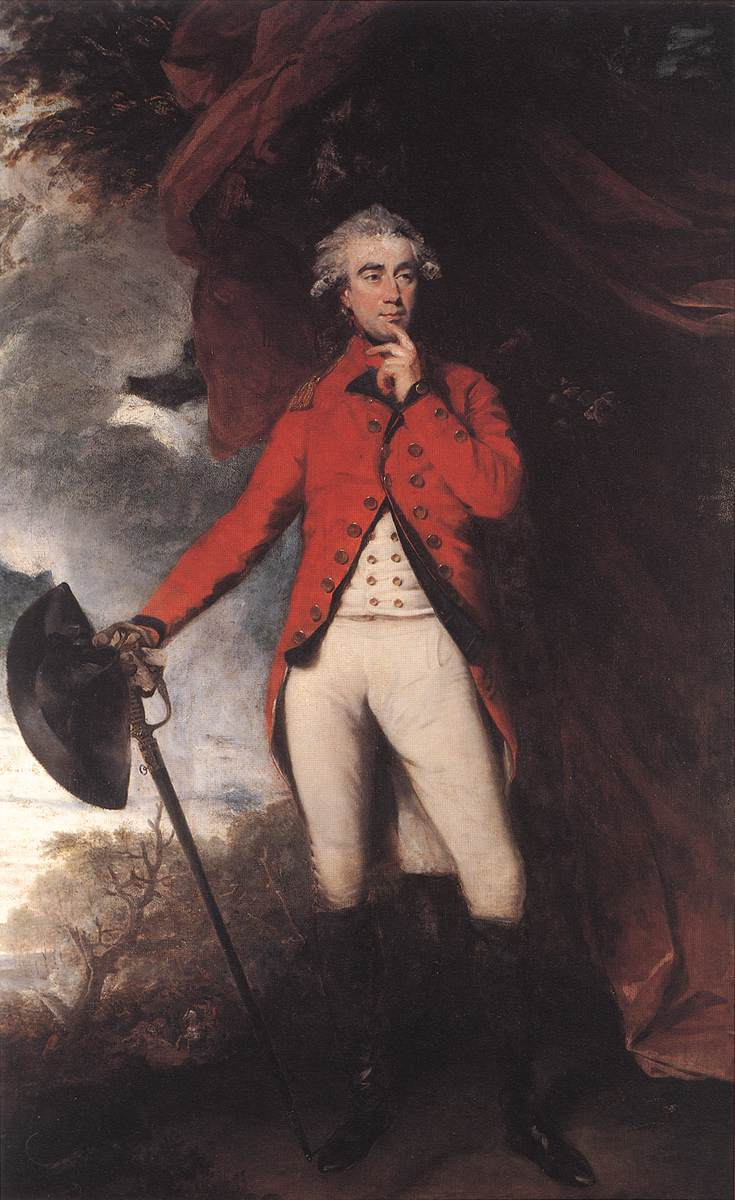
Portrait of Lord Moira by Joshua Reynolds.

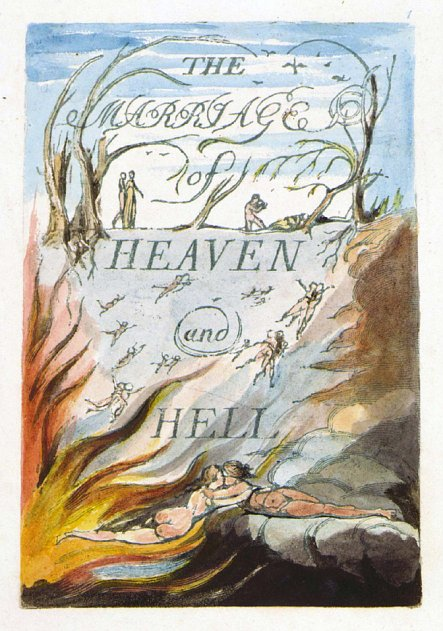
Title page of Blake's book

- William Blake – The Marriage of Heaven and Hell
- Louis-Léopold Boilly
  - The Sorrows of Love
  - Woman Showing Her Portrait
- Mather Brown
  - Portrait of Henry Angelo
  - Portrait of Richard Arkwright
- Giuseppe Cades – The Virgin Mary and Infant Jesus served by the Angels
- Henri-Pierre Danloux – Le supplice d'une vestale
- Johann Heinrich Fussli – Thor Battering the Midgard Serpent
- Gaetano Gandolfi – Joseph's Dream
- Francisco de Goya – El Afilador and Sagrada Familia
- Angelica Kauffman – Venus überredet Helena Paris zu erhören
- Thomas Lawrence – Homer Reciting his Poems
- Philip James de Loutherbourg – Visitor to a Moonlit Churchyard
- Joshua Reynolds – Portrait of Lord Moira
- Henry Singleton – The Storming of the Bastille
- George Stubbs – The Lincolnshire Ox
- Giovanni Domenico Tiepolo – Pulcinella und Saltimbanchi
- John Trumbull – Washington at Verplanck's Point
- J.M.W. Turner – Lambeth Palace
- Joseph Wright of Derby
  - Moonlight, Coast of Tuscany
  - Portrait of Richard Arkwright
  - Portrait of Jedediah Strutt

== Births ==
- January 1 – George Petrie, Irish painter, musician, antiquary and archaeologist (died 1866)
- January 25 – Moritz Michael Daffinger, Austrian miniature painter and sculptor (died 1849)
- January 30 – Carl Gustaf Löwenhielm, Swedish diplomat who made paintings of the countries in which he served (died 1858)
- February 19 – Anton Schimser, Polish sculptor of Austrian origin (died 1838)
- March – Kapiton Zelentsov, Russian painter notable for his book illustrations (died 1845)
- March 14 – Ludwig Emil Grimm, German painter and engraver (died 1863)
- March 28 – William Henry Hunt, English water-color painter (died 1864)
- May 22 - Bianca Milesi, Italian writer, painter, and patriot (died 1849)
- May 23 - James Pradier, Swiss-born French sculptor in the neoclassical style (died 1852)
- June 19 – John Gibson, Welsh-born sculptor (died 1866)
- July 6 – Giuseppe Tominz, Italian-Slovenian portrait painter (died 1866)
- July 18 – John Frazee, first American born sculptor to execute a bust in marble (died 1852)
- September 24 – Robert Trewick Bone, English painter of sacred, classical and genre scenes (died 1840)
- date unknown
  - Willis Buell, American politician and portrait painter (died 1851)
  - Keisai Eisen, Japanese ukiyo-e artist (died 1848)
  - Henri van der Haert, Belgian portrait painter, sculptor, illustrator and engraver (died 1846)
  - Paweł Maliński, Czech-born sculptor and mason who lived and worked in Poland (died 1853)
  - Edward Villiers Rippingille, English painter (died 1859)
  - Luigi Rossini, Italian artist known for his etchings of ancient Roman architecture (died 1857)

== Deaths ==
- February 20 – Erik Pauelsen, Danish landscape painter (born 1749)
- March 8 – Augustyn Mirys, Polish painter (born 1700)
- March 28 – François-Elie Vincent, Swiss painter of portrait miniatures (born 1708)
- April 29 – Charles-Nicolas Cochin, French engraver, designer, writer, and art critic (born 1715)
- August – Agostino Carlini, Italian sculptor and painter (born 1718)
- September 24 – John Keyse Sherwin, English engraver and painter (born 1751)
- date unknown:
  - Isoda Koryusai, Japanese printmaker and painter (born 1735)
  - Niccolò Lapiccola, Italian painter (born 1730)
