= Portrait of Richard Arkwright =

Portrait of Richard Arkwright may refer to:

- Portrait of Richard Arkwright (Wright)
- Portrait of Richard Arkwright (Brown)
