= Portrait of the Countess of Wilton =

1829 painting by Thomas Lawrence

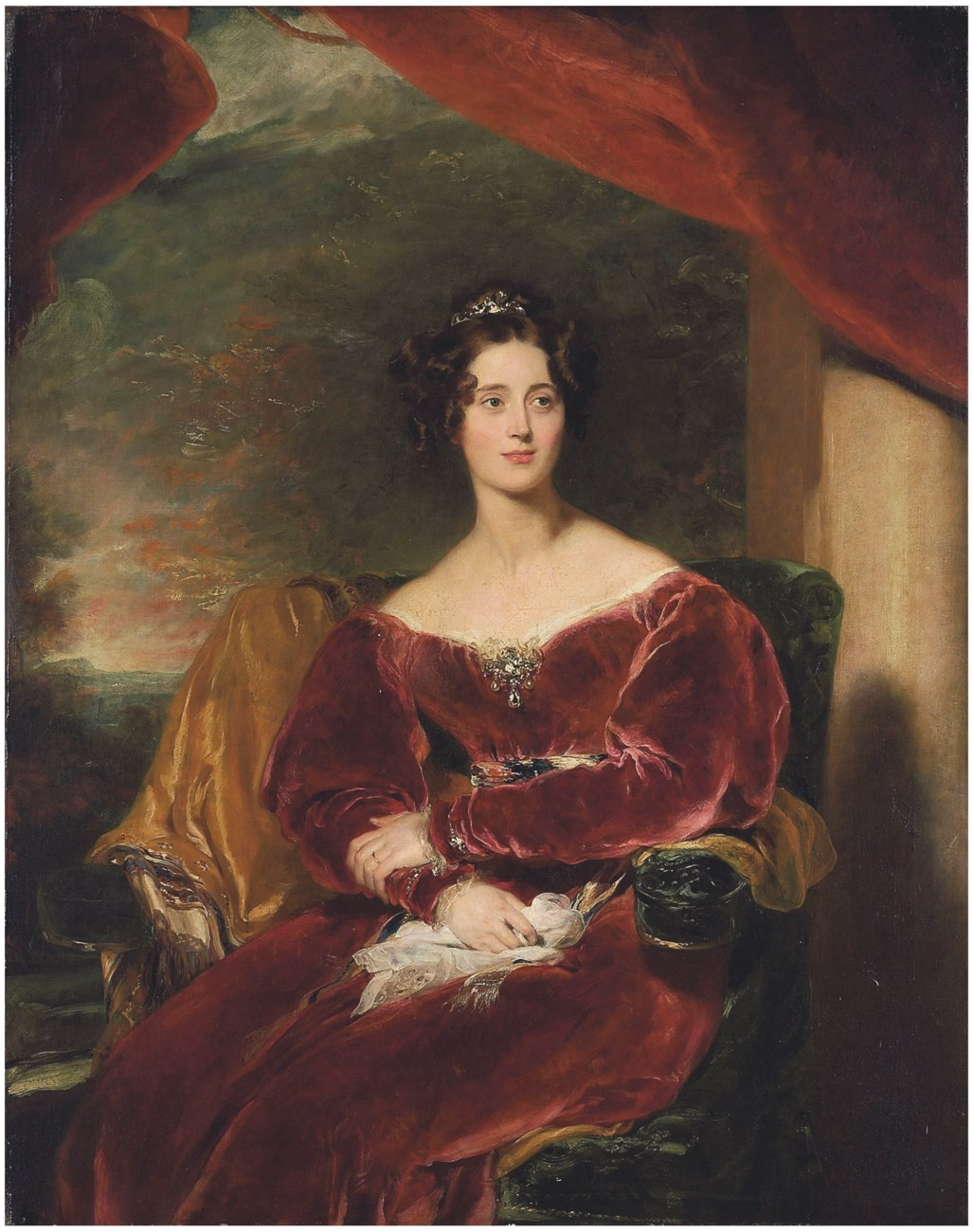
- Artist: Thomas Lawrence
- Year: 1829
- Type: Oil on canvas, portrait painting
- Dimensions: 144 cm × 114.3 cm (57 in × 45.0 in)
- Location: Private Collection

Portrait of the Countess of Wilton is an 1829 portrait painting by the British artist Thomas Lawrence. It depicts the aristocrat Mary, Countess of Wilton. She was the wife of the Tory politician Thomas Egerton, Earl of Wilton who she married in 1821. The countess is shown at three-quarters length seated and wearing a red velvet dress. She was the daughter of the Earl of Derby and his second wife the Irish former actress Elizabeth Farren. Both the Countess and her husband were close friends with the Duke of Wellington, and she wrote to him frequently.

At the beginning of his career Lawrence had enjoyed a major success at the Royal Academy Exhibition of 1790 with his Portrait of Elizabeth Farren depicting her mother. By the time he painted this picture, Lawrence had long been stablished as the leading portraitist of the Regency era and was President of the Royal Academy. His sudden death in January 1830 left a large number of paintings unfinished and this is amongst his last completed commissions.

The picture was displayed at the Art Treasures Exhibition of 1857 in Manchester alongside with Lawrence's portrait of her mother. The painting remained in the family's hands until 1868 when it was sold. At one point it was owned by Raymond Roussel when it was valued at 435,000 francs. In 2010 the painting was auctioned by Christie's, selling for £1.77 million, considerably more than the estimated price. In 1838 a mezzotint was produced by the engraver George Henry Phillips, based on Lawrence's painting.

== Bibliography ==
- Caradec, François. Raymond Roussel. Atlas Press, 2001.
- Garlick, Kenneth. Sir Thomas Lawrence: A Complete Catalogue of the Oil Paintings. Phaidon, 1989.
- Gower, Ronald Sutherland. George Romney And Sir Thomas Lawrence. Scribner and Welford, 1882.
- Johnston, William R. The Nineteenth Century Paintings in the Walters Art Gallery. Walters Art Gallery, 1982.
- Pergam, Elizabeth A. The Manchester Art Treasures Exhibition of 1857. Routledge, 2017.
