= Regency Power and Brilliance =

2010 art exhibition

Thomas Lawrence: Regency Power and Brilliance was an art exhibition held at the National Portrait Gallery in London between 21 October 2010 and 23 January 2011 before transferring to the Yale Center for British Art between 23 February and 5 June 2011. It focused on the life and works of the British artist Thomas Lawrence.

Born in Bristol, Lawrence grew up in Devizes in Wiltshire. A child prodigy he became the leading portrait painter of the Regency era. The exhibition included paintings from both Britain and the United States. Amongst the works on display was The Red Boy, an 1825 depiction of the son of the politician John Lambton. It was then in a private collection, but was acquired by the National Gallery for £9.3 million in 2021.

== Gallery ==
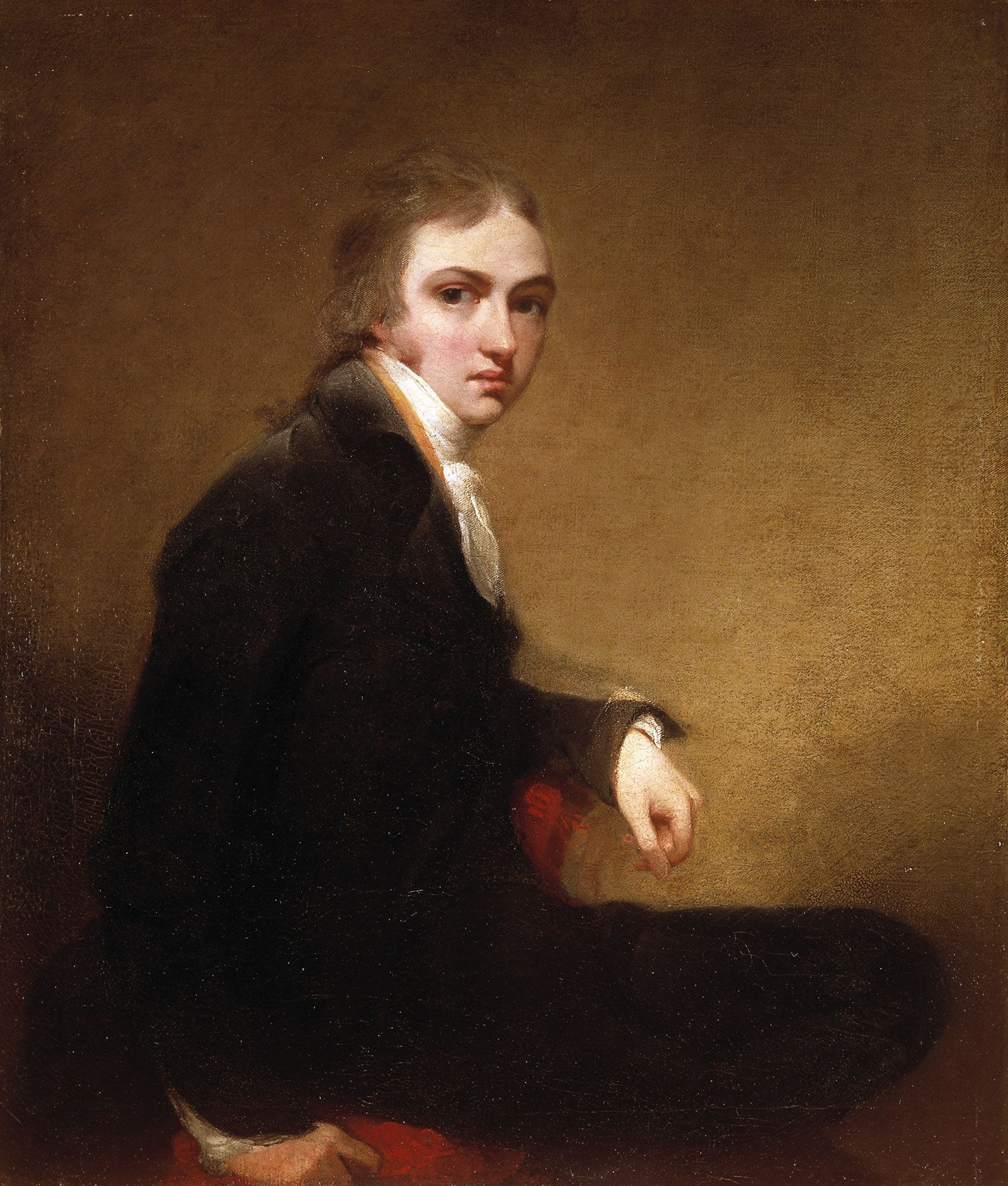
Self-Portrait, 1788

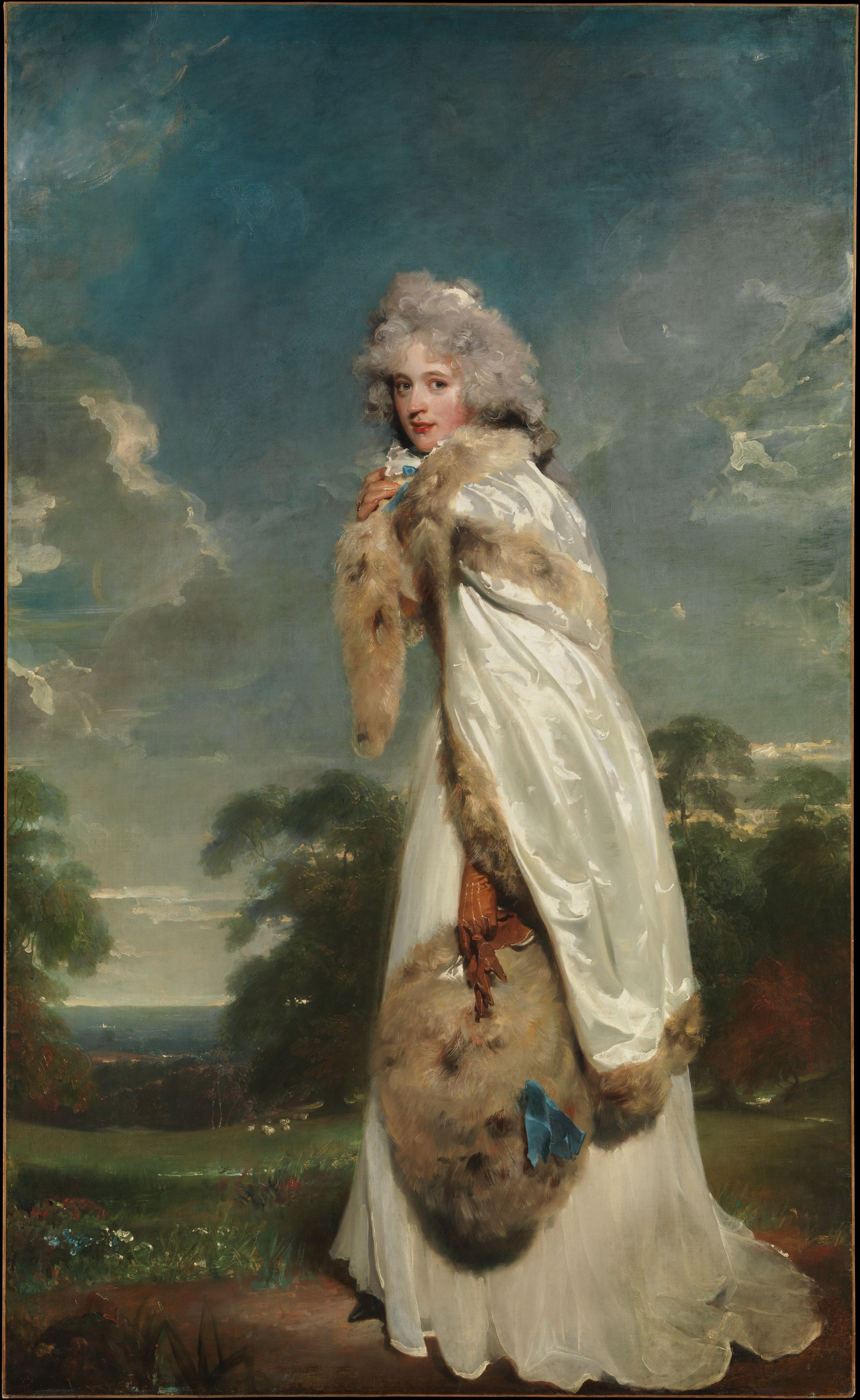
Portrait of Elizabeth Farren, 1790

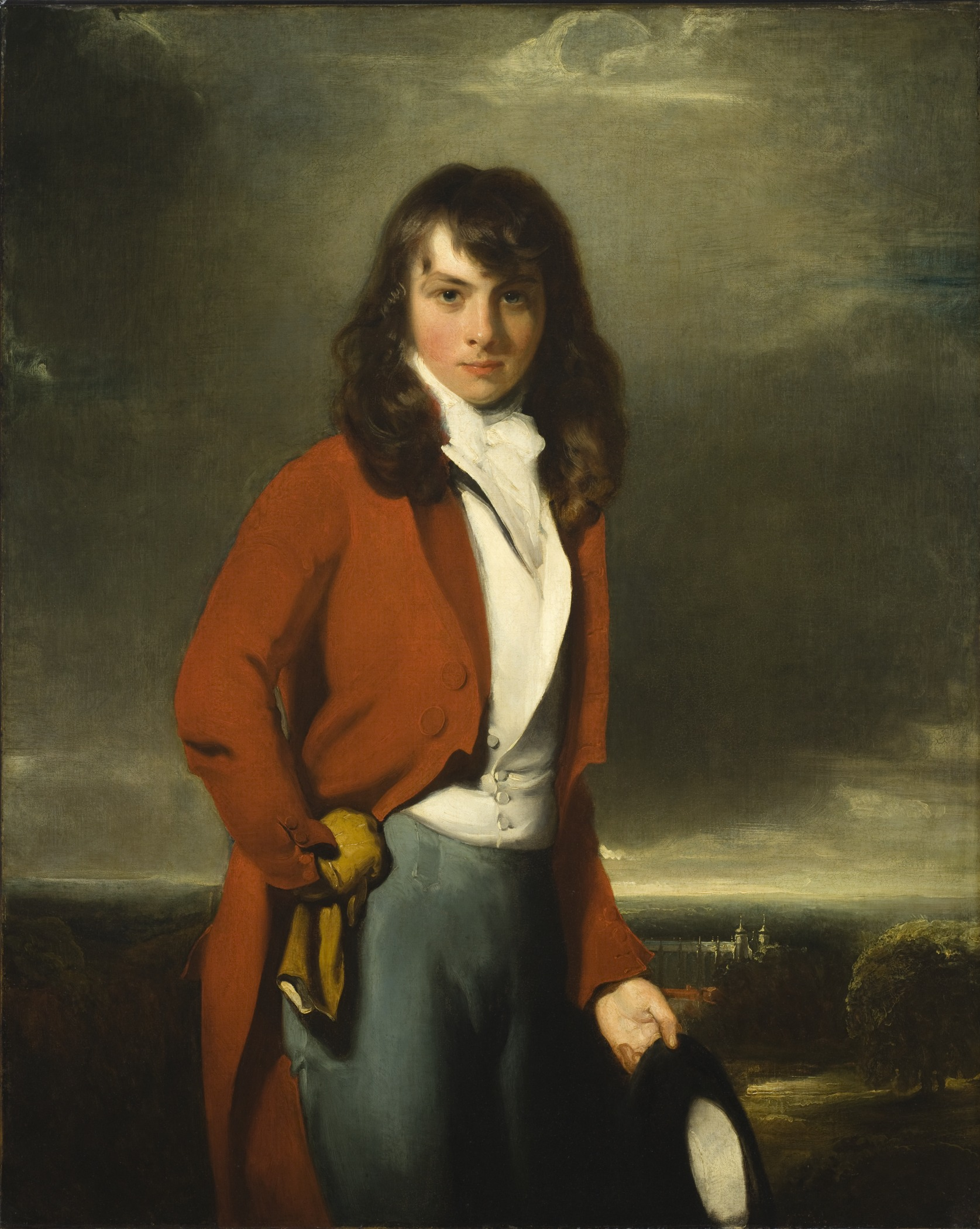
Portrait of Arthur Atherley, 1792

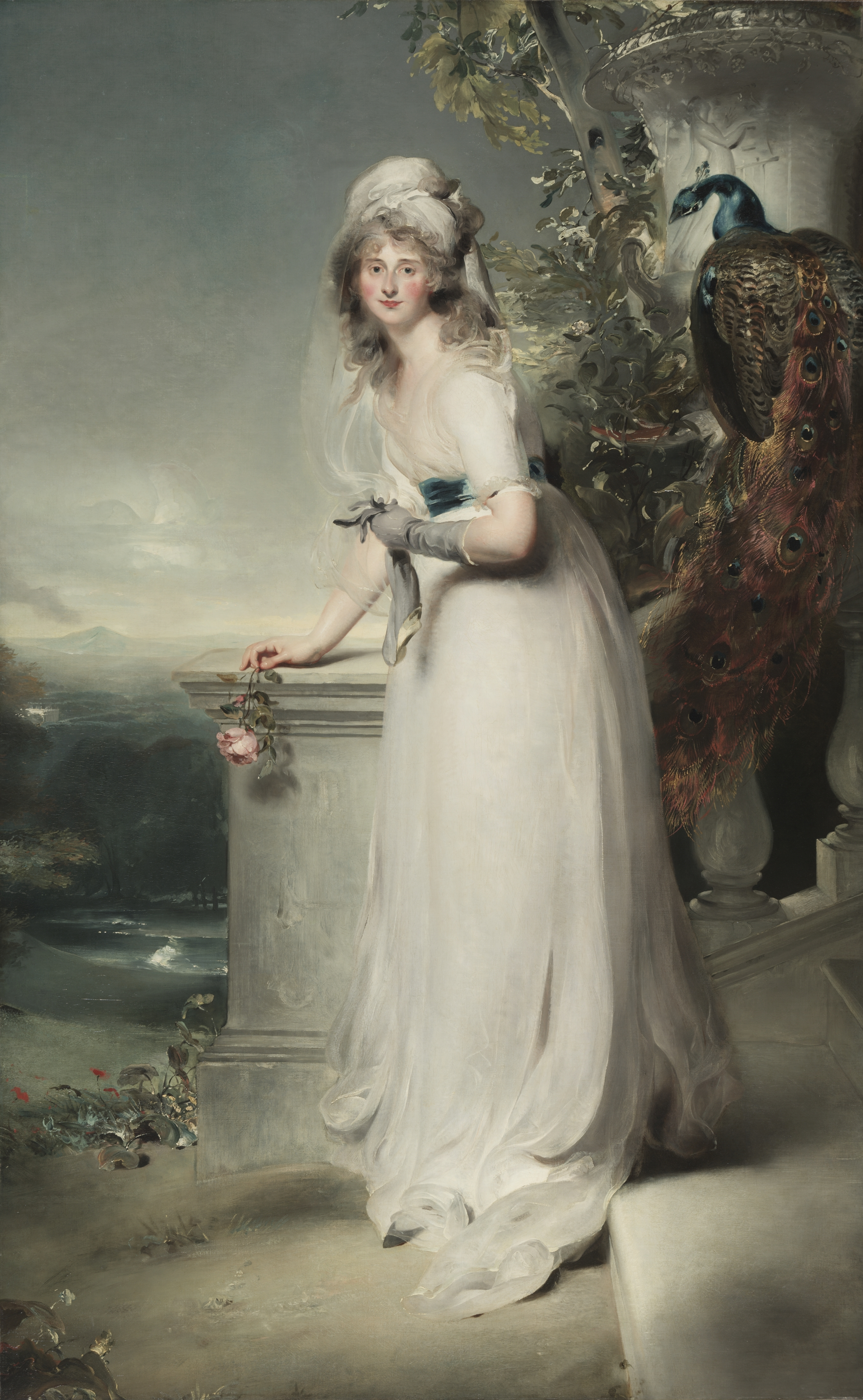
Portrait of Lady Manners, 1794

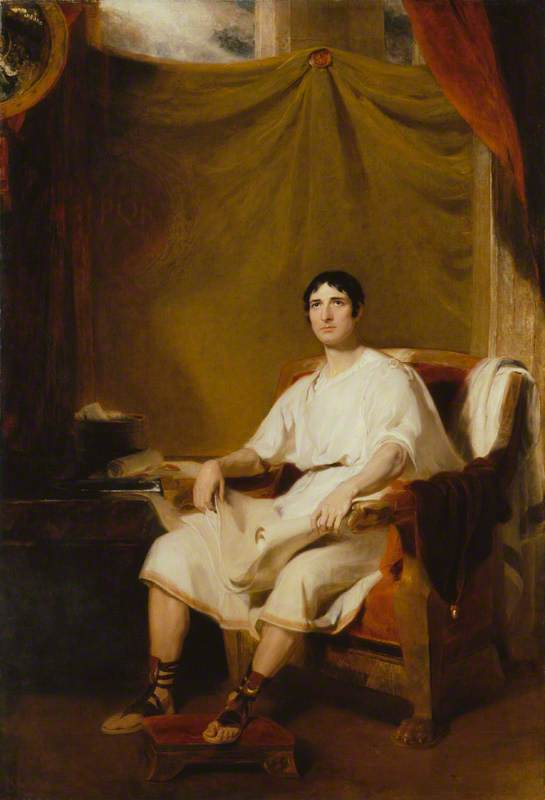
John Philip Kemble as Cato, 1812

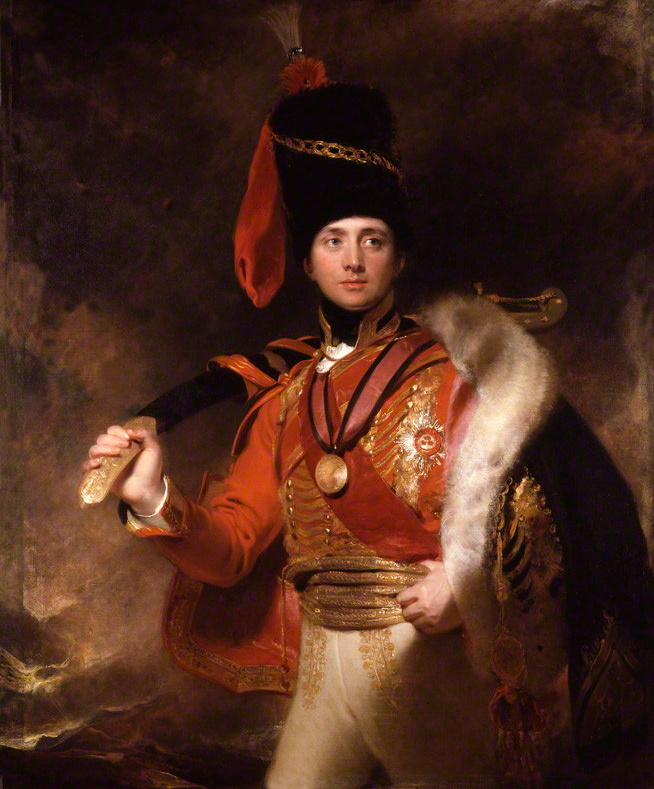
Portrait of Sir Charles Stewart, 1812

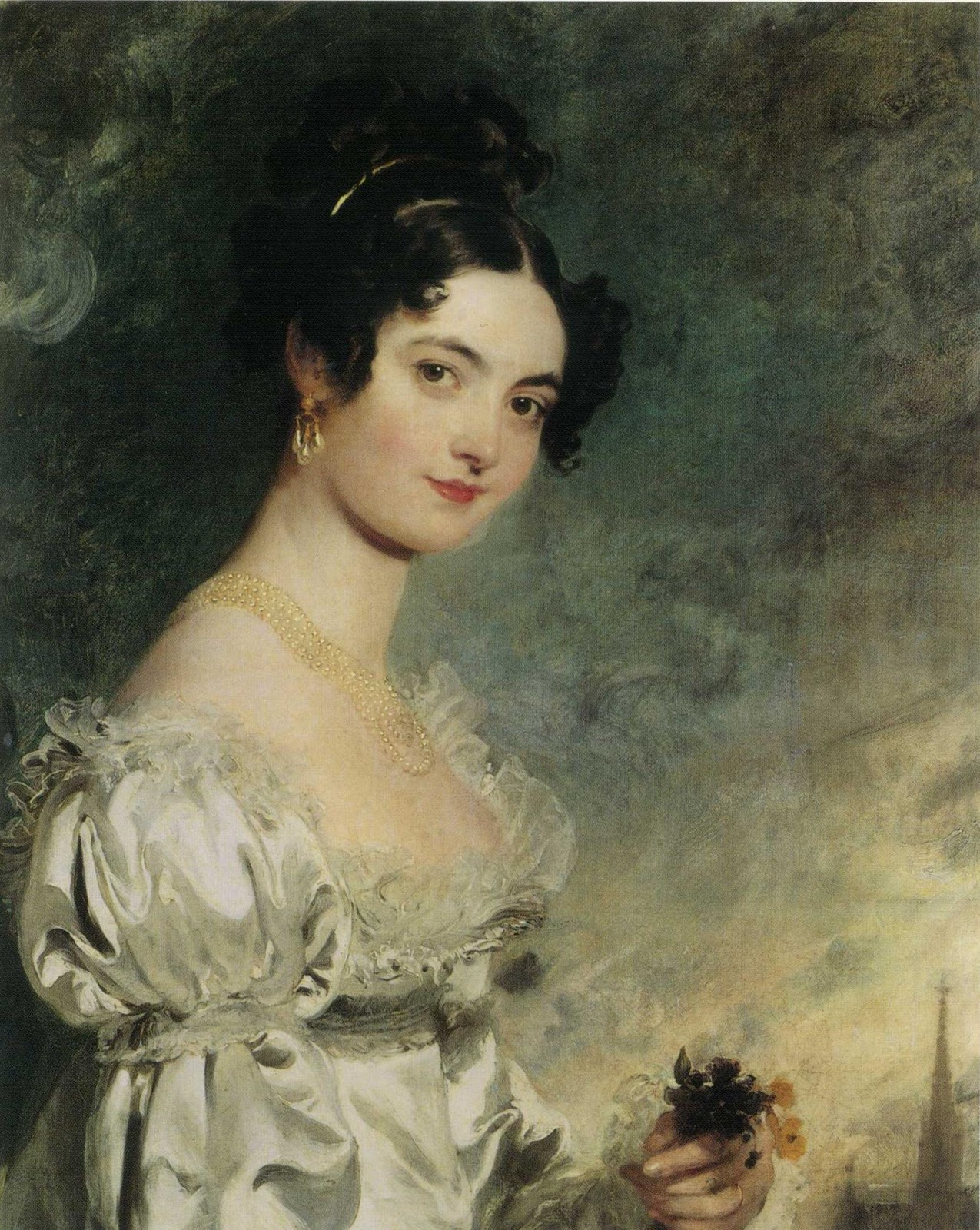
Portrait of Selina Meade, 1819

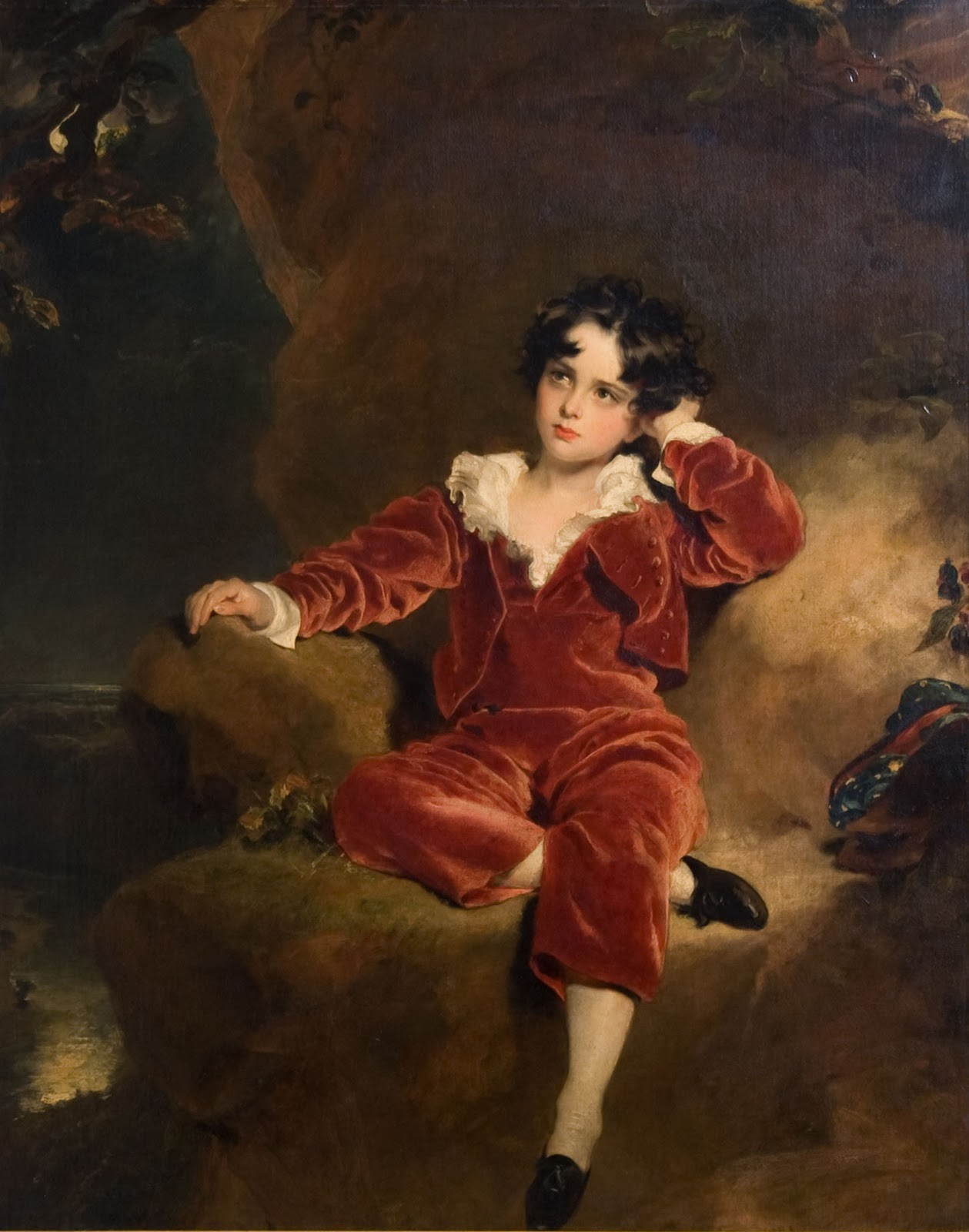
The Red Boy, 1825

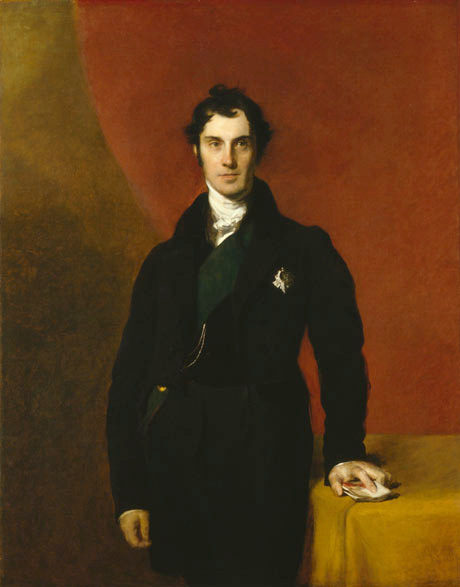
Portrait of Lord Aberdeen, 1830

== Bibliography ==
- Albinson, Cassandra, Funnell, Peter & Peltz, Lucy. Thomas Lawrence: Regency Power and Brilliance. Yale University Press, 2010.
