= Charles Townley in His Sculpture Gallery =

Painting by Johann Zoffany

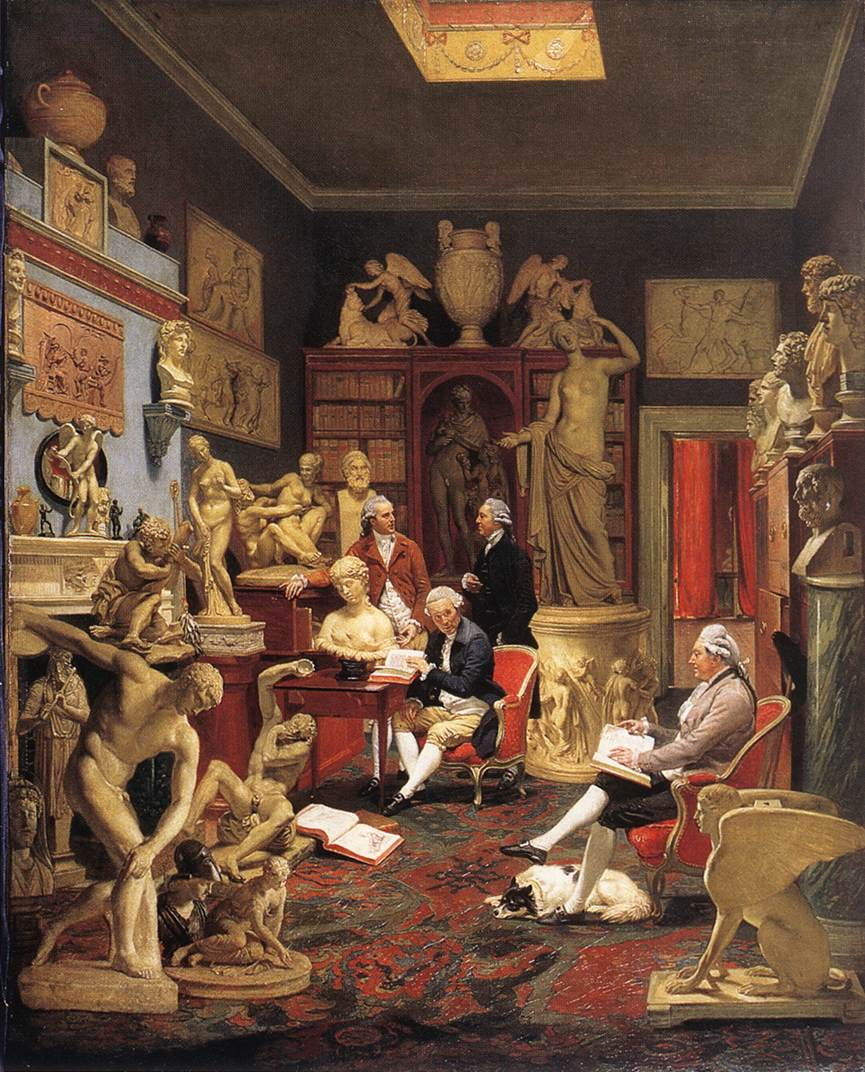
- Artist: Johan Zoffany
- Year: 1782
- Type: Oil on canvas
- Dimensions: 127 cm × 102 cm (50 in × 40 in)
- Location: Towneley Hall Art Gallery and Museum, Burnley

Charles Townley in His Sculpture Gallery, also known as Charles Townley at His Library at no. 7 Park Street in Westminster, is an oil-on-canvas painting by German British artist Johan Zoffany, made in 1782. It is held in the Towneley Hall Art Gallery and Museum, in Burnley. It was displayed at the Royal Academy Exhibition of 1790 at Somerset House.

== Description ==
The painting witnesses the interest and fascination exercised by the ancient art of Greece and Rome, during the neoclassical period, and the wish to collect ancient pieces, casts or reproductions of Roman or Hellenistic statues experienced by many collectors and intellectuals of that time. In the painting, Charles Townley, the landlord, sits on the right in a red velvet armchair, engaged in a discussion with three friends. The room where the four figures are placed is filled with famous statues and sculptural groups from the ancient times, such as the Discobolus, discovered in 1791 at Hadrian's Villa, and only added to the work (completed in 1782) after that year. In the painting, in fact, Zoffany does not deal so much with describing in detail the interior of the library, of which only the fireplace and the bookcase at the bottom are portrayed, but with creating a picturesque "virtual space" where is gathered the collection of antiquities of Townley, who were actually scattered in several rooms of his home in Park Street, Westminster, in London.

== Bibliography ==
- Loughlin, Felicity and & Johnston, Alexandre (ed.) Antiquity and Enlightenment Culture: New Approaches and Perspectives. BRILL, 2020.
