= Portrait of Queen Charlotte (Dance-Holland) =

1768–1769 painting by Nathaniel Dance-Holland

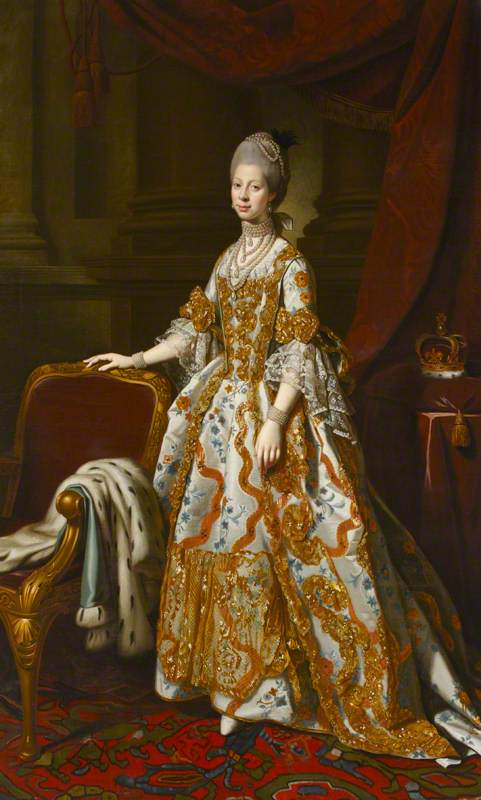
- Artist: Nathaniel Dance-Holland
- Year: 1768–1769
- Type: Oil on canvas, portrait painting
- Dimensions: 233.7 cm × 142.2 cm (92.0 in × 56.0 in)
- Location: Uppark House, Sussex

Portrait of Queen Charlotte is an oil on canvas portrait painting by the English artist Nathaniel Dance-Holland, from 1768–1769. It depicts the German-born Charlotte of Mecklenburg-Strelitz, queen consort of the British monarch George III.

Dance-Holland spent more than a decade in Italy before returning to Britain where he became a noted portraitist. He was a founder member of the Royal Academy and chose to exhibit this and a portrait of George III at the inaugural Royal Academy Exhibition of 1769 at Pall Mall. Both paintings are now in the collection of the National Trust at Uppark House in West Sussex.

== See also ==
- Portrait of Queen Charlotte, a 1789 portrait by Thomas Lawrence

== Bibliography ==
- Gott, Ted & Benson, Laurie. Painting and Sculpture Before 1800 in the International Collections of the National Gallery of Victoria. National Gallery of Victoria, 2003.
- Ingamells, John. National Portrait Gallery Mid-Georgian Portraits, 1760–1790. National Portrait Gallery, 2004.
- Palmer, Allison Lee. Historical Dictionary of Neoclassical Art and Architecture. Scarecrow Press, 2011.
