= Portrait of Lady Manners =

Painting by Thomas Lawrence

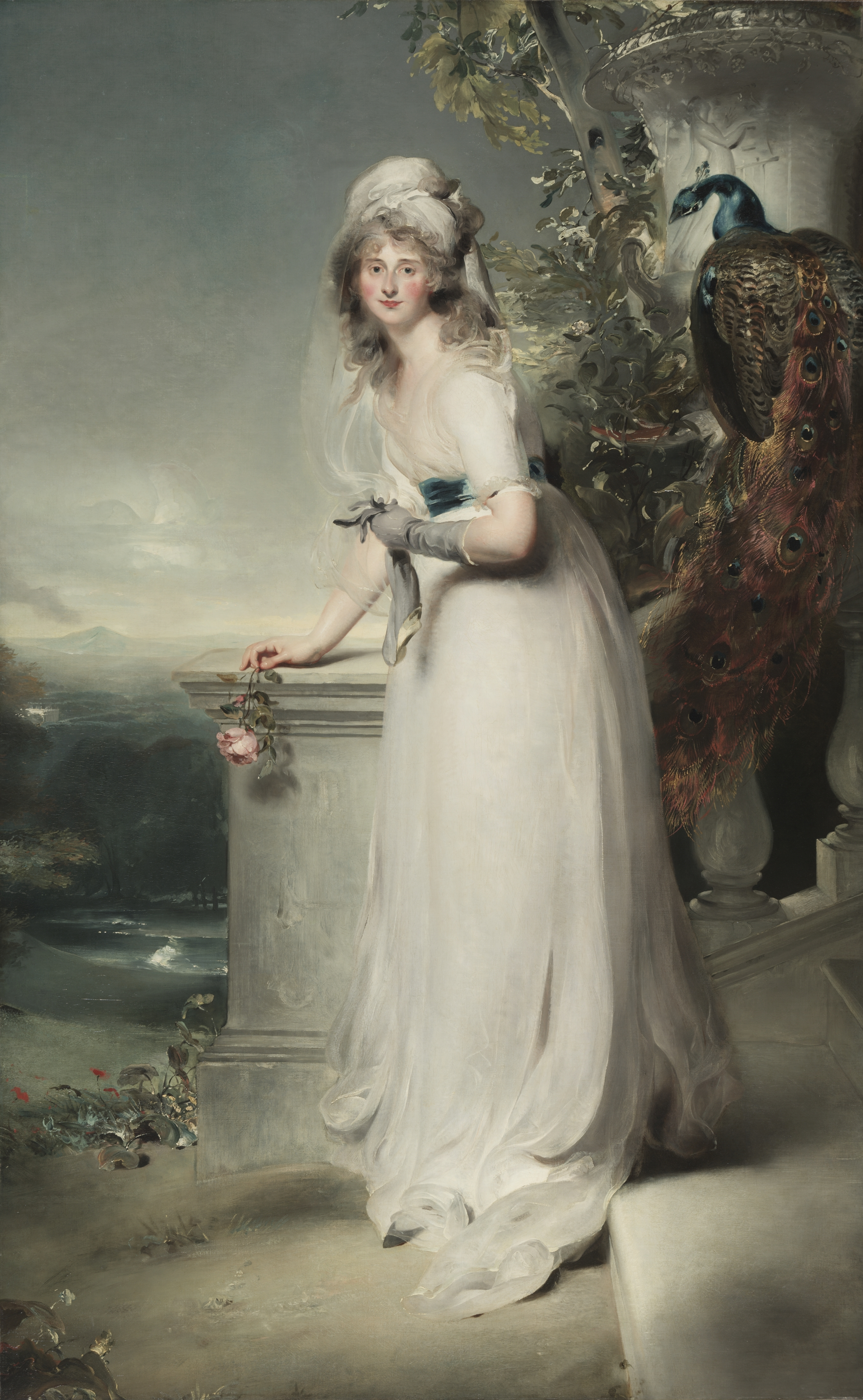
- Artist: Thomas Lawrence
- Year: 1794
- Type: Oil on canvas, portrait painting
- Dimensions: 255.3 cm × 158 cm (100.5 in × 62 in)
- Location: Cleveland Museum of Art, Ohio

Portrait of Lady Manners is a 1794 portrait painting by the British artist Thomas Lawrence. It features a full-length view of the Irish author Catherine Gray, Lady Manners. The County Cork-raised Gray was known for her poetry. She married the Tory politician Sir William Manners and her son later became Earl of Dysart. She is shown at the bottom of some marble steps holding a rose with a peacock behind her. Although Romantic in style, Lawrence made references to neoclassical themes. Her pose is taken from the Medici Venus while the peacock is likely an allusion to Juno. The Borghese Vase is seen in the top right.

The painting was displayed at the Royal Academy Exhibition of 1794 at Somerset House in London. Manners herself was displeased with the work, possibly considering the peacock shown reflecting vanity. The same year Lawrence, an innkeeper's son from Devizes, was elected a full member of the Royal Academy of Arts at the unprecedented age of twenty four. He would later become the dominant portraitist of the Regency era and became President of the Royal Academy in 1820. Due to her dislike Manners did not purchase the painting and it remained in Lawrence's studio for decades. It is now in the collection of the Cleveland Museum of Art in Ohio which acquired it in 1961 through the bequest of John D. Rockefeller Jr. Lucy Peltz has described it as one of "Lawrence's most memorable and strange portraits". It featured in the 2011 exhibition Regency Power and Brilliance held at the Yale Center for British Art.

== Bibliography ==
- Albinson, Cassandra, Funnell, Peter & Peltz, Lucy. Thomas Lawrence: Regency Power and Brilliance. Yale University Press, 2010.
- Chong, Alan. European & American Painting in the Cleveland Museum of Art. Cleveland Museum of Art, 1993.
- Engel, Laura. Women, Performance and the Material of Memory: The Archival Tourist, 1780–1915. : Palgrave Macmillan, 2018.
- Wright, Amina. Thomas Lawrence: Coming of Age. Bloomsbury Publishing, 2020.
