= Anton Schimser =

Anton Schimser (19 February 1790–5 August 1838) was a Sculptor from the Austrian Empire, and founder of a family of stonemasons in Lemburg.

Schimser arrived in Lemberg in 1812, his brother Johann Baptist (1793-1856) in 1826. After the death of Johann, Schimser took over the family business with his son Leopold (1833-1888) and after the death of hid spouse Victoria Schimser (1838-1908).

Anton Schimser studied at the Academy of Fine Arts Vienna and at the École nationale supérieure des Beaux-Arts in Paris. After graduation, he stayed in Rome and Bratislava. His work was influenced creatively by Antonio Canova. In 1812 he settled in Lviv, where he established a sculpture studio in which he worked alone, then with his brother Johann. Since 1820 has worked with the sculptor Hartman Witwer (1774-1825). He was carving tombstone, mainly in the Lychakiv Cemetery, but also in cemeteries in and around Lviv, and also sculptural design houses and public buildings. In 1833 unsuccessfully applied for the post of lecturer of sculpture in the Academy of Fine Arts.
