= Portrait of Elizabeth Farren, Later Countess of Derby =

Painting by Thomas Lawrence

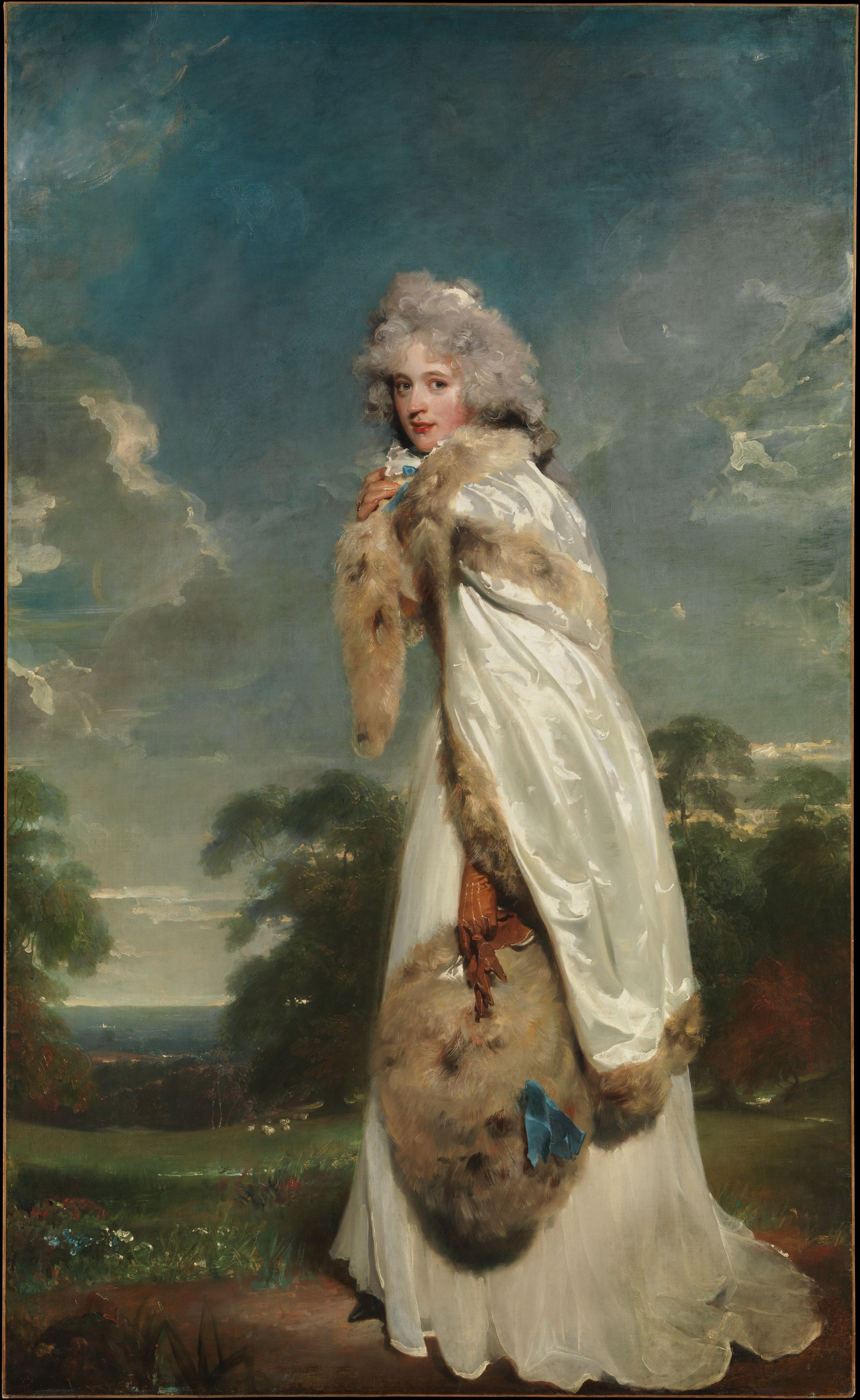
- Artist: Thomas Lawrence
- Year: c. 1790
- Medium: Oil on canvas
- Subject: Elizabeth Warren
- Dimensions: 238.8 x 146.1
- Location: Metropolitan Museum of Art, New York

Portrait of Elizabeth Farren, Later Countess of Derby is an oil on canvas painting by the English artist Thomas Lawrence. Produced probably in 1790, it is now in the Metropolitan Museum of Art, in New York, to which it was donated by Edward S. Harkness in 1940. As its title states, its subject the actress Elizabeth Farren married Edward Smith-Stanley, 12th Earl of Derby in 1797, seven years after the painting.

It was displayed at the Royal Academy Exhibition of 1790 at Somerset House along with Lawrence's Portrait of Queen Charlotte.

== Description ==
Farren is represented here as a high society lady, elegantly dressed in noble fabrics and fur. Lawrence skillfully represents light on this type of fabric. Despite the elegance of her outfit, she appears in the green glade of a forest, with a meadow and trees. She is depicted in a low point of view, and as such much of the background is filled with the sky. The young woman's expression is very natural, to the point that one critic wrote: "...she is entirely Elizabeth Farren: carefree, mischievous, jovial, friendly and elegant."
