= The Lincolnshire Ox =

Painting by George Stubbs

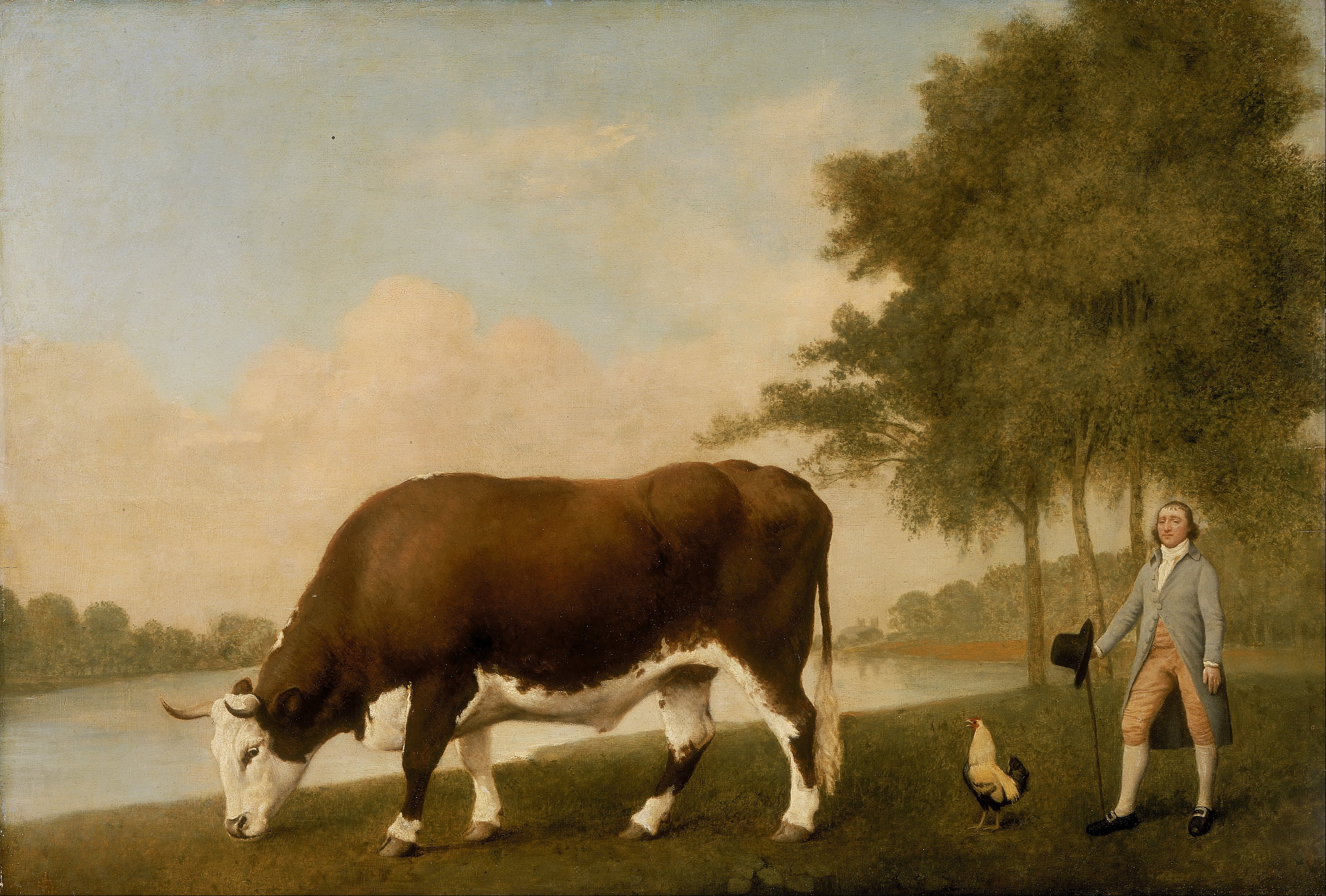
- Artist: George Stubbs
- Year: 1790
- Type: Oil on panel, animal painting
- Dimensions: 67.9 cm × 99 cm (26.7 in × 39 in)
- Location: Walker Art Gallery, Liverpool

The Lincolnshire Ox is an oil on canvas by the English artist George Stubbs, from 1790. It is held in the Walker Art Gallery, in Liverpool.

== History and description ==
Stubbs was a noted animal painter and the work feature a celebrated ox of the era. Having been born in Gedney in Lincolnshire in 1782, the Hereford breed Ox had grown to such a large size by the end of the decade that it was taken to London and displayed at venues, including the Lyceum in the Strand, for more than a year. It is shown in this work with his owner, John Gibbons, who commissioned it, and in the company of a noted fighting cock, at the right, also owned by Gibbons.

The painting was displayed at the Royal Academy Exhibition of 1790 at Somerset House. Today it is in the collection of the Walker Art Gallery, having been acquired in 1941.

== Bibliography ==
- Blake, Robin. George Stubbs And The Wide Creation:Animals, People and Places in the Life of George Stubbs 1724-1806. Random House, 2016.
- Egerton, Judy. George Stubbs, Painter. Yale University Press, 2007.
