= Homer Reciting his Poems =

1790 painting by Thomas Lawrence

Homer Reciting His Poems
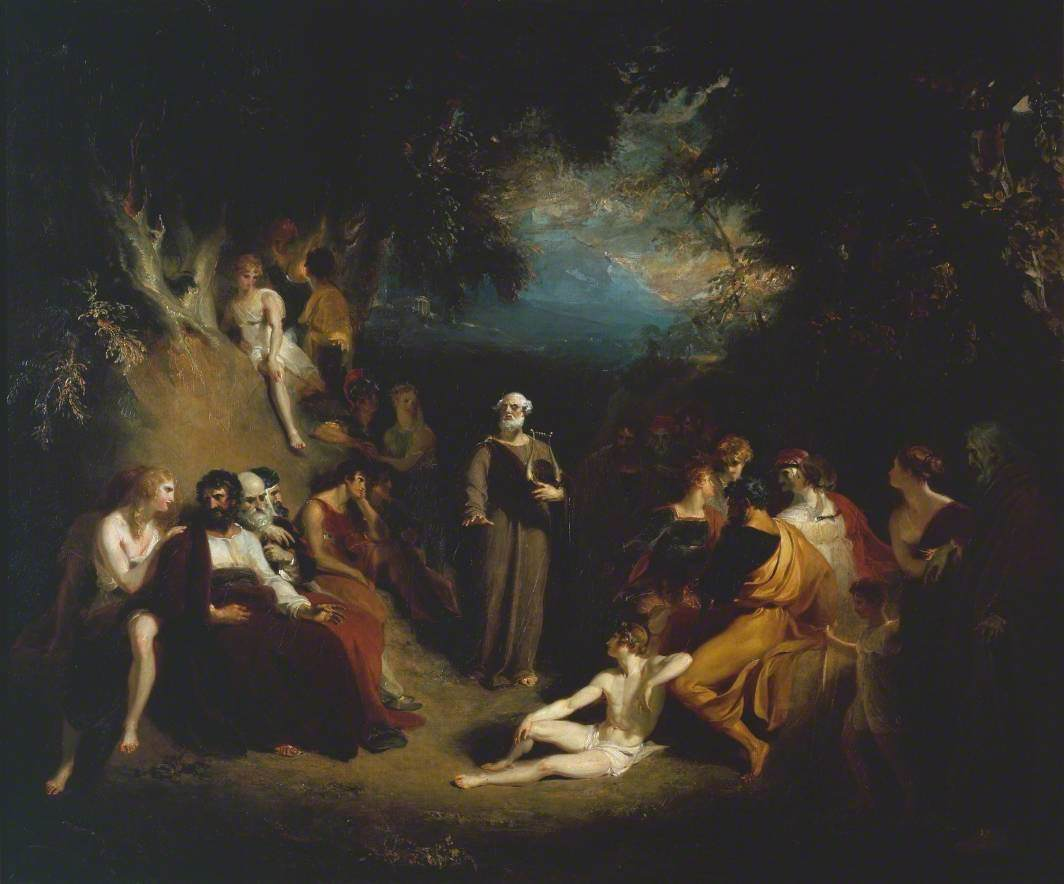
- Artist: Thomas Lawrence
- Year: 1790
- Type: Oil on canvas, history painting
- Dimensions: 94 cm × 111.1 cm (37 in × 43.7 in)
- Location: Tate Britain, London

Homer Reciting His Poems is an oil on canvas history painting by the British artist Thomas Lawrence, from 1790.

== History and description ==
It depicts the classical Greek poet Homer reciting his Iliad to a receptive audience. It was a rare venture into the genre for the artist, who went on to became known as the leading portrait painter of the Regency era. He was around twenty one when he painted it. Around the same time he also produced a landscape painting A View of Dovedale, displaying his versatility as an artist.

The painting was produced for the archaeologist Richard Payne Knight and was exhibited at the Royal Academy's Summer Exhibition of 1791 at Somerset House. Today it is part of the collection of the Tate Britain in Pimlico, having been acquired in 1975.

== Bibliography ==
- Levey, Michael. Sir Thomas Lawrence. Yale University Press, 2005.
- Lloyd, Stephen & Sloan, Kim. The Intimate Portrait: Drawings, Miniatures and Pastels from Ramsay to Lawrence. National Galleries of Scotland, 2008.
- Wright, Amina. Thomas Lawrence: Coming of Age. Bloomsbury Publishing, 2020.
