= Visitor to a Moonlit Churchyard =

Painting by Philip James de Loutherbourg

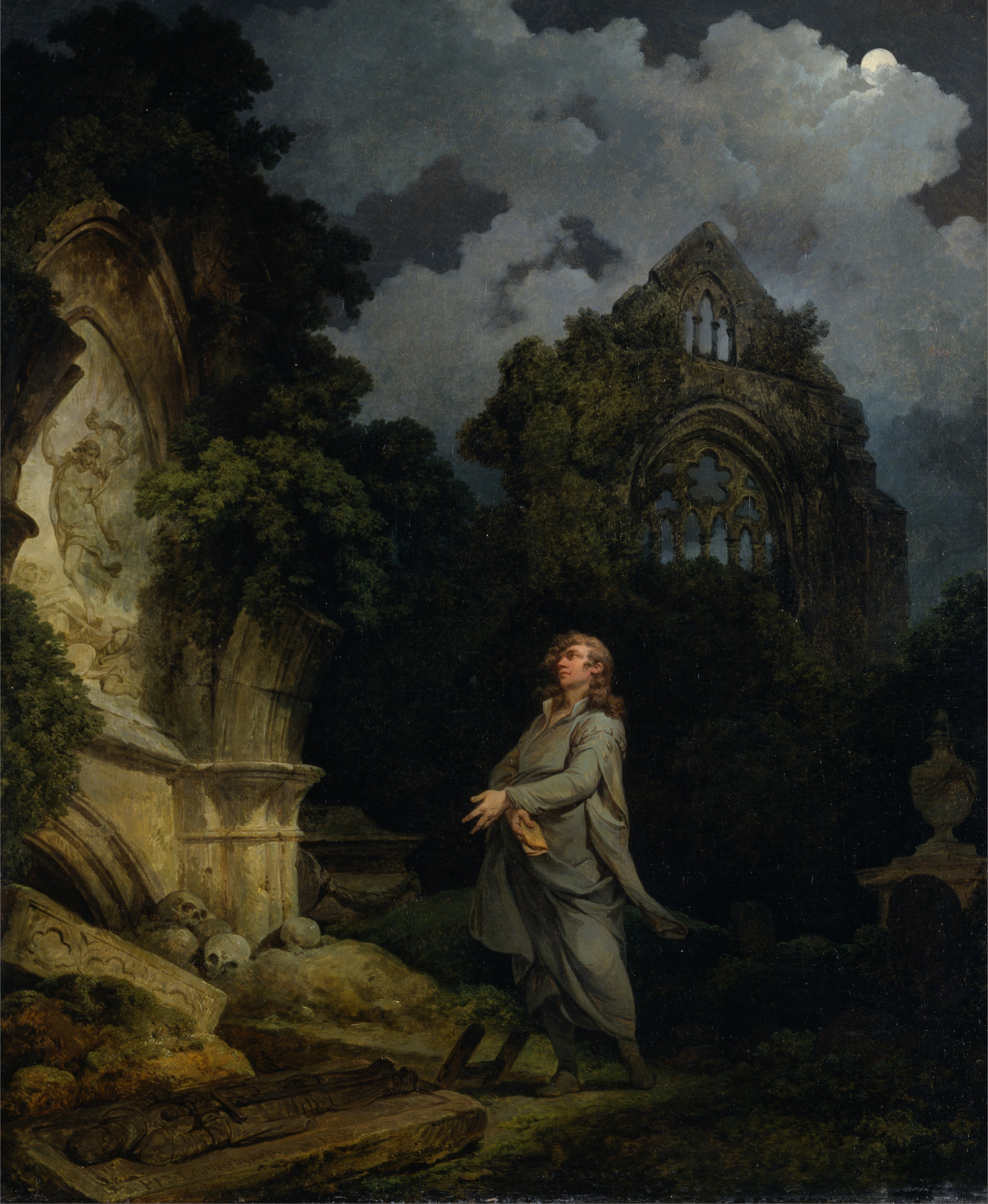
- Artist: Philip James de Loutherbourg
- Year: 1790
- Type: Oil on canvas
- Dimensions: 86.4 cm × 68.6 cm (34.0 in × 27.0 in)
- Location: Yale Center for British Art, New Haven

Visitor to a Moonlit Churchyard is a 1790 oil painting by the French-born British artist Philip James de Loutherbourg. It combines elements of Gothic and the emerging romantic art trend. It is also known as A Philosopher in a Moonlit Churchyard.

Inspired by the work Night-Thoughts by the English poet Edward Young, it depicts a young man in the ruins of Tintern Abbey in the middle of the night. The ivy-covered ruins shown by Loutherbourg are a capriccio, Today the painting is in the Yale Center for British Art in Connecticut as part of the Paul Mellon Collection.

== Bibliography ==
- Edney, Sue (ed.) EcoGothic gardens in the long nineteenth century: Phantoms, fantasy and uncanny flowers. Manchester University Press, 2020.
- Myrone, Martin, Frayling, Christopher & Warner, Marina. Gothic Nightmares: Fuseli, Blake and the Romantic Imagination. Harry N. Abrams, 2006.
- Preston, Lillian Elvira. Philippe Jacques de Loutherbourg: Eighteenth Century Romantic Artist and Scene Designer. University of Florida, 1977.
- Spira, Andrew. The Invention of the Self: Personal Identity in the Age of Art. Manchester University Press, 2020
