= Royal Academy Exhibition of 1790 =

1790 art exhibition in London

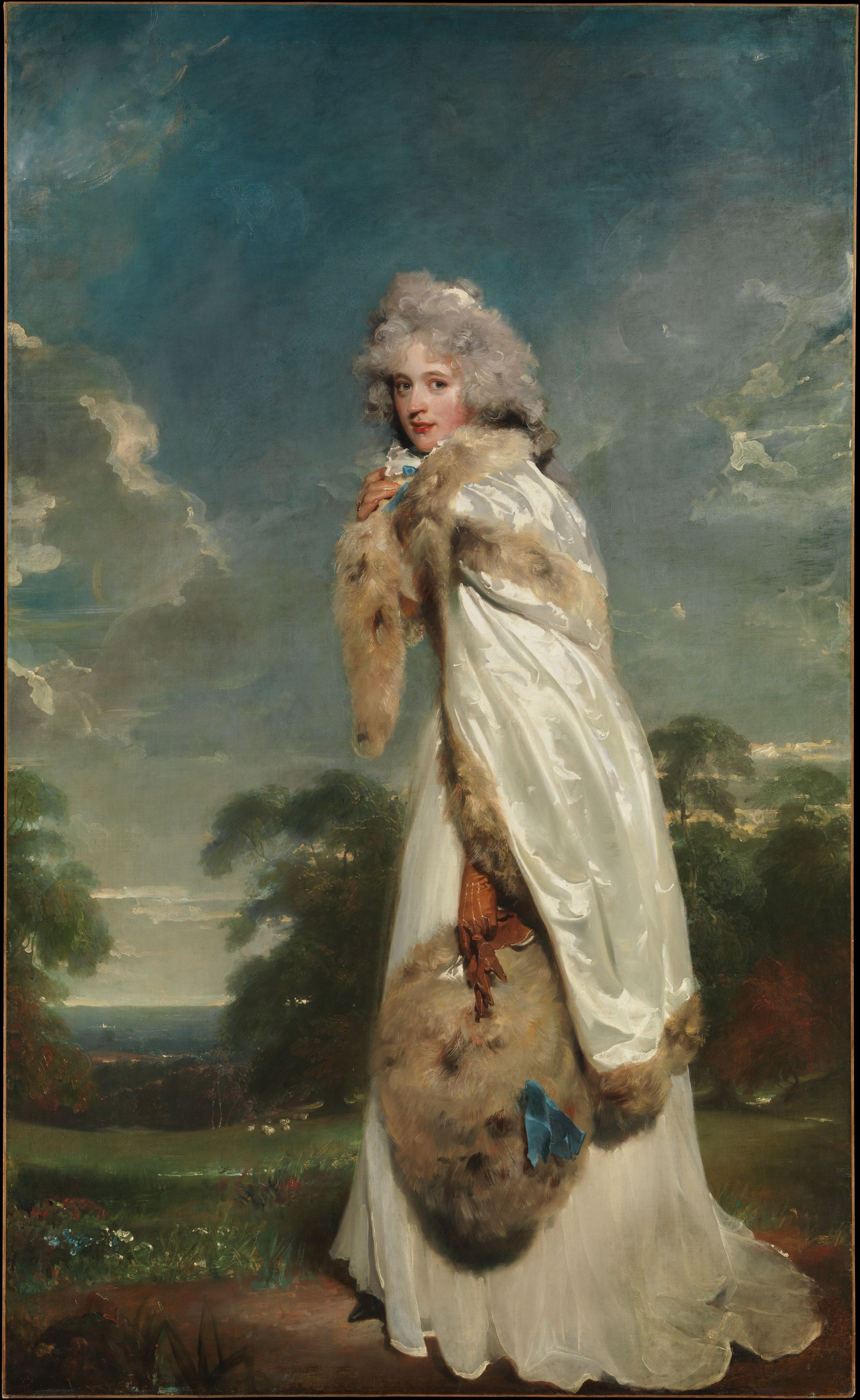
Portrait of Elizabeth Farren by Thomas Lawrence

The Royal Academy Exhibition of 1790 was the twenty second annual Summer Exhibition of the Royal Academy of Arts, held at Somerset House in London between 28 April and 1 July 1790. It became notable for the passing of the torch between Sir Joshua Reynolds and the much younger artist Thomas Lawrence both of whom were portrait painters. Reynolds had been President of the Royal Academy since its foundation in 1768. It was the last time he would exhibit due to failing eyesight and he died in 1792. Lawrence would emerge as the leading portraitist of the Regency era and would himself be elected as president in 1820.

Lawrence had been a child prodigy working in Bath before moving to London in 1787 where he received encouragement from Reynolds. He was twenty years old when the exhibition opened. Amongst the dozen works he displayed was his Portrait of Queen Charlotte that had received a royal commission to produce at Windsor Castle. Particular praise was given to his Portrait of Elizabeth Farren featuring the Irish stage actress. Farren, the future Countess of Derby, was reportedly irritated by the work being described in the exhibition catalogue as Portrait of an Actress so Lawrence altered it to read Portrait of a Celebrated Actress. It hung nearby to Reynolds' portrait of the opera singer Elizabeth Billington as Saint Cecilia.

Johann Zoffany displayed Charles Townley in His Sculpture Gallery which featured the collector Charles Townley with the antique statues he had acquired, which The Times compared to his earlier work The Tribuna of the Uffizi. As was often noted there were comparatively few history paintings on display. This contrasted sharply with the newly opened Boydell Shakespeare Gallery in Pall Mall. Amongst the few works on display were the now-lost Queen of Sheba Entertained at a Banquet of King Solomon by William Hamilton and a painting of Moses by Benjamin West intended for the chapel at Windsor Castle. The animal painter George Stubbs submitted The Lincolnshire Ox, a depiction of an ox that became celebrated for its giant size. The fifteen year old J.M.W. Turner, then a student at the Royal Academy Schools, submitted his first ever exhibited work Lambeth Palace a watercolour of Lambeth Palace. Turner would have a long association with the Royal Academy, exhibiting for the final time at the Royal Academy Exhibition of 1850 during the Victorian era.

== Gallery ==
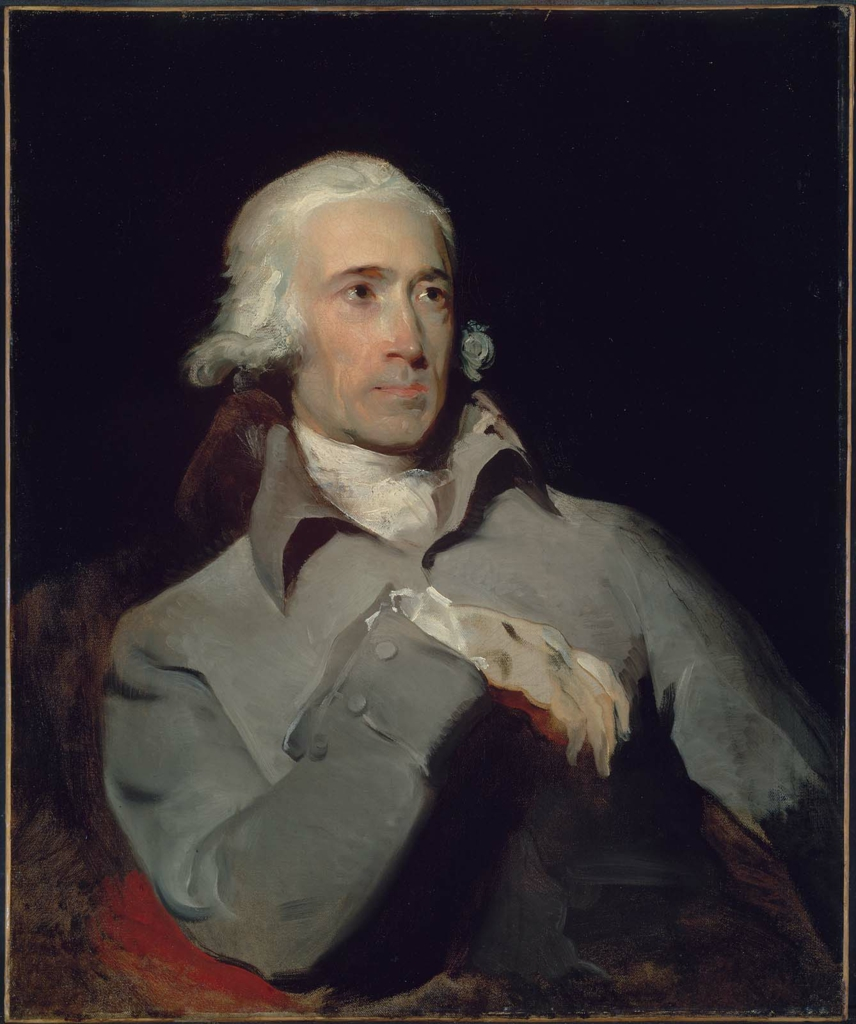
Portrait of William Locke by Thomas Lawrence

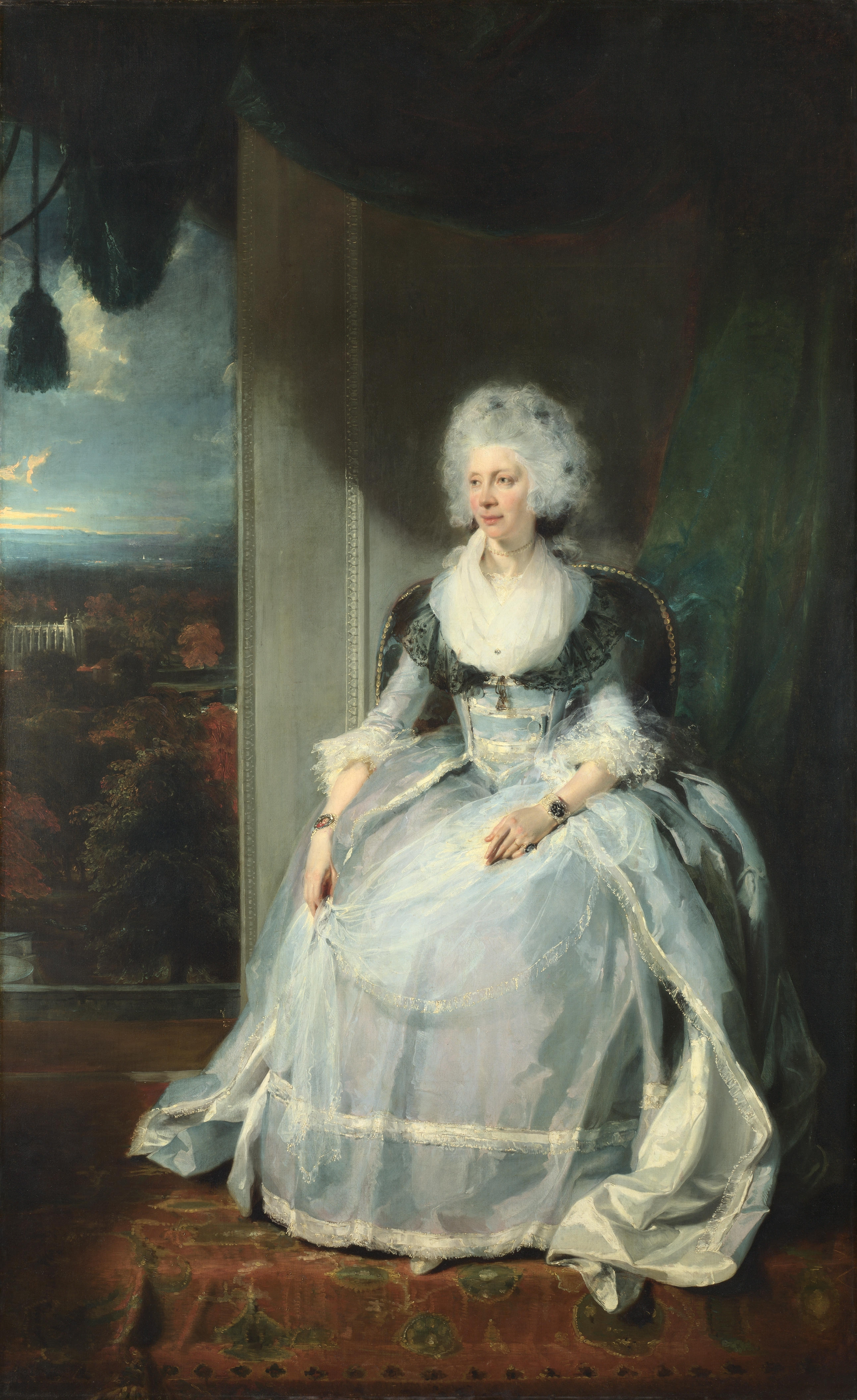
Portrait of Queen Charlotte by Thomas Lawrence

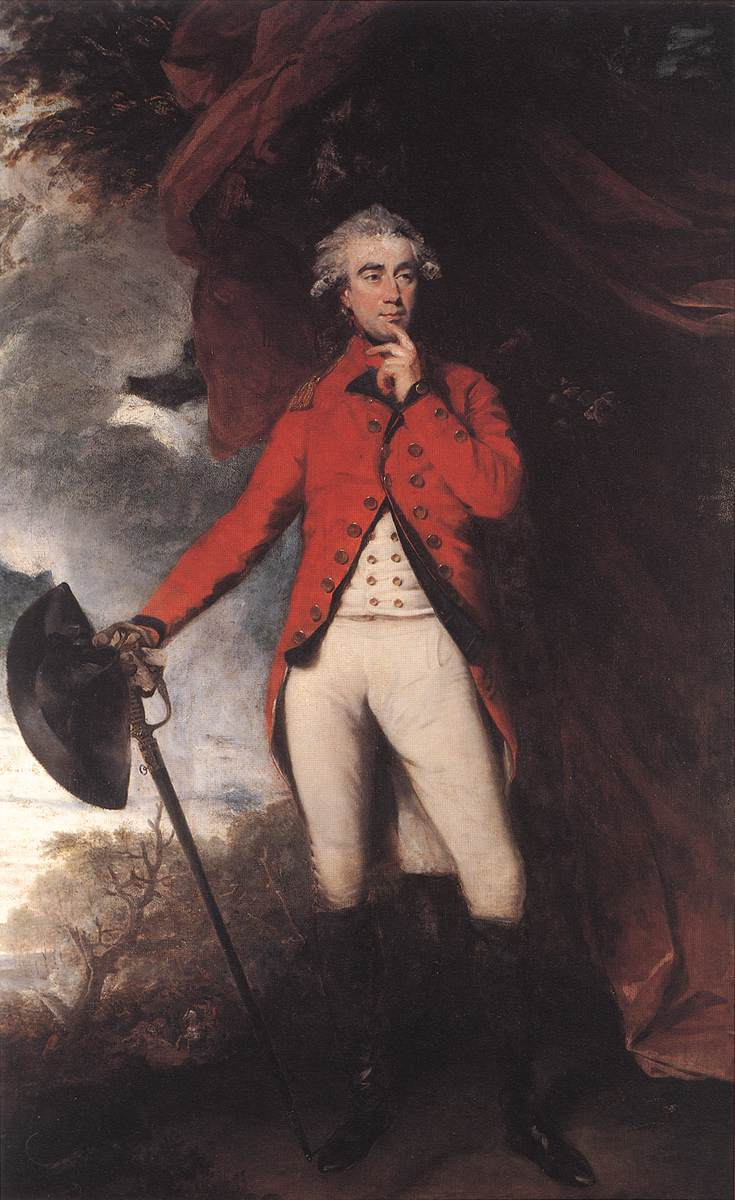
Portrait of Lord Moira by Joshua Reynolds

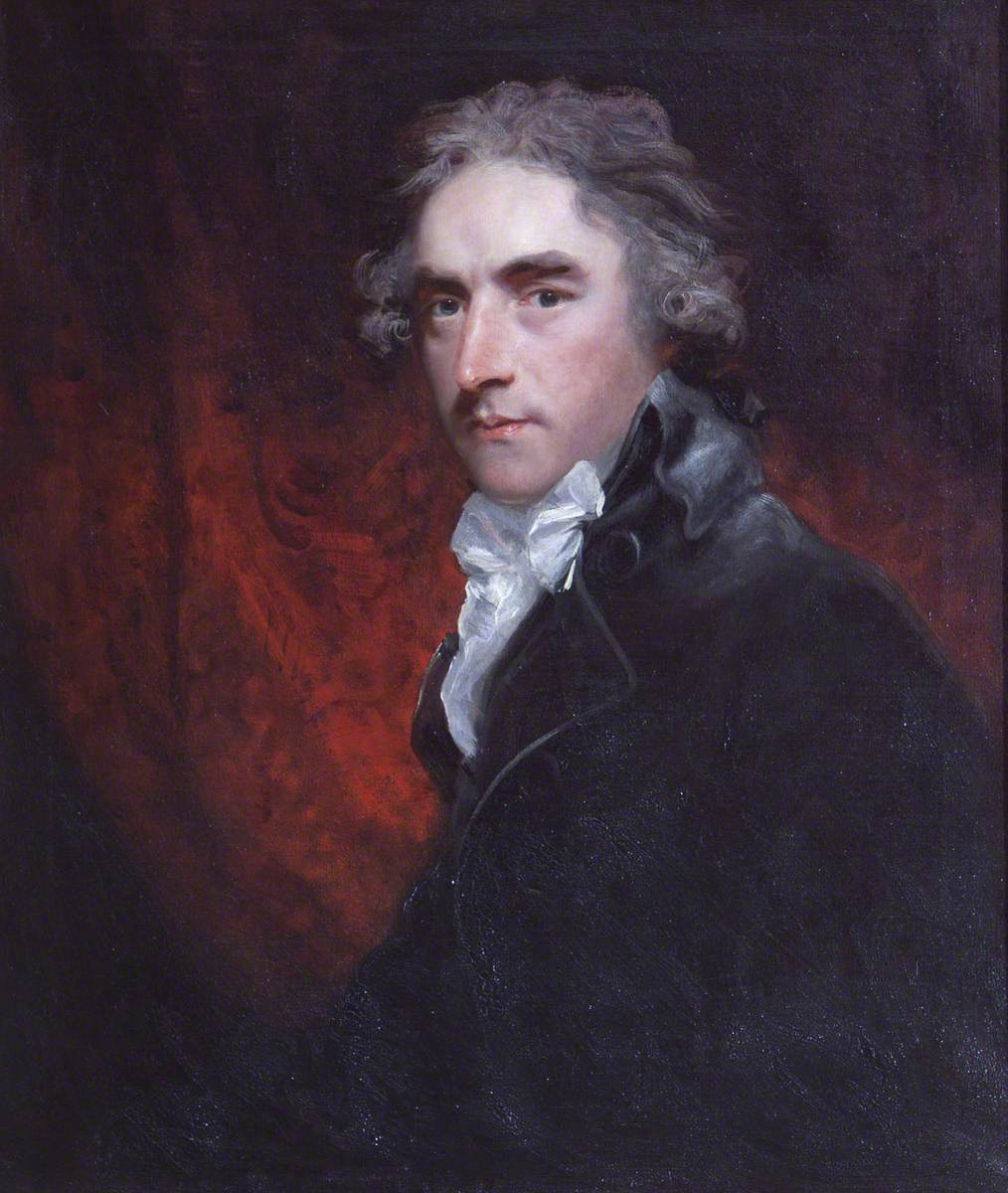
Portrait of George James Cholmondeley by Joshua Reynolds

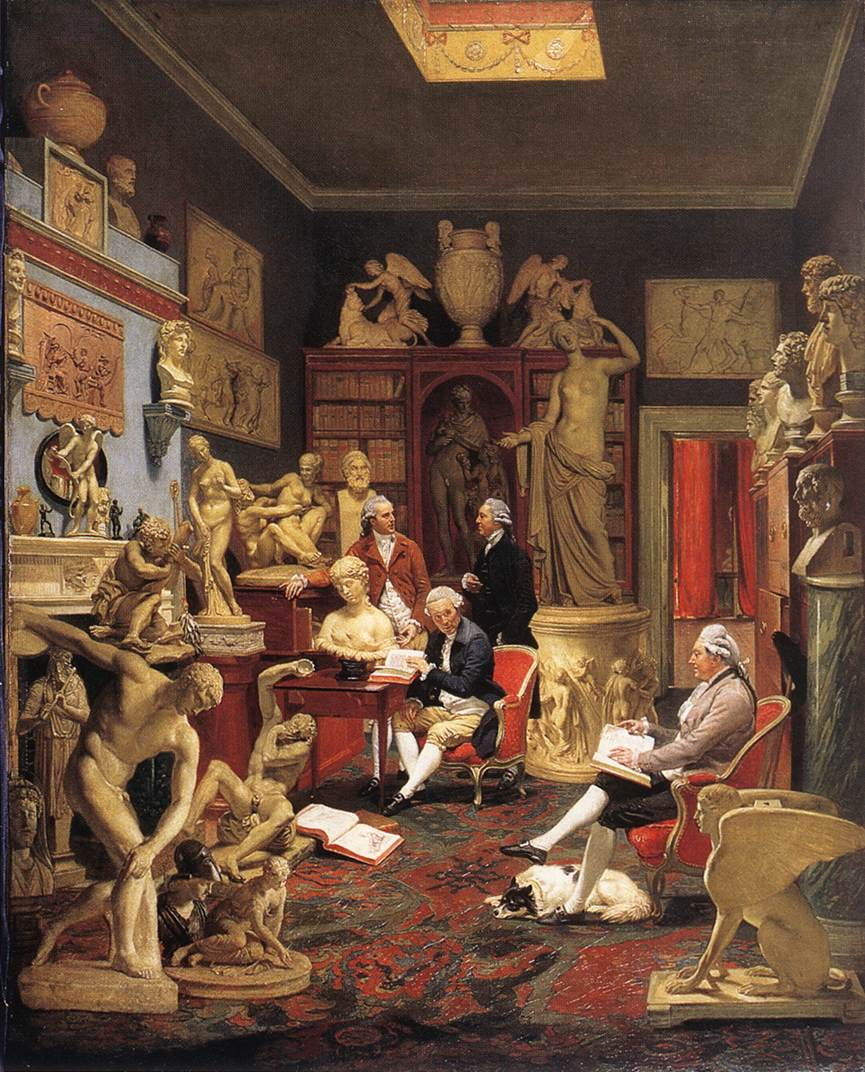
Charles Townley in His Sculpture Gallery by Johann Zoffany

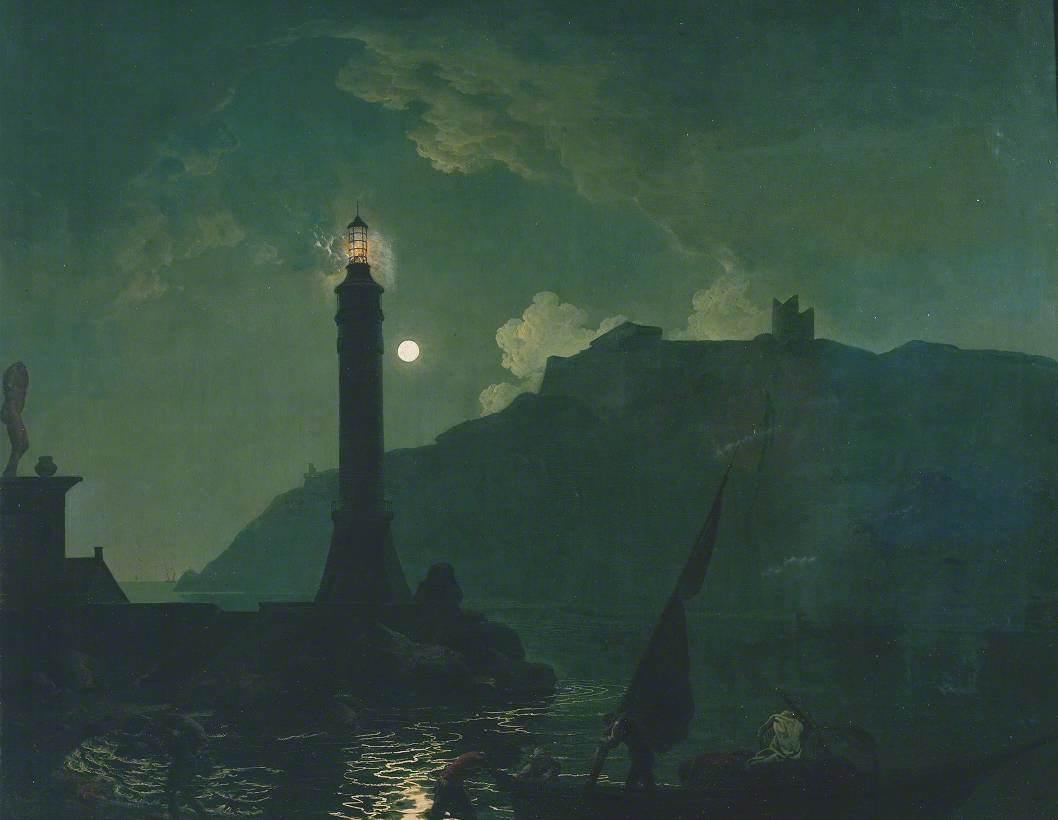
Moonlight, Coast of Tuscany by Joseph Wright of Derby

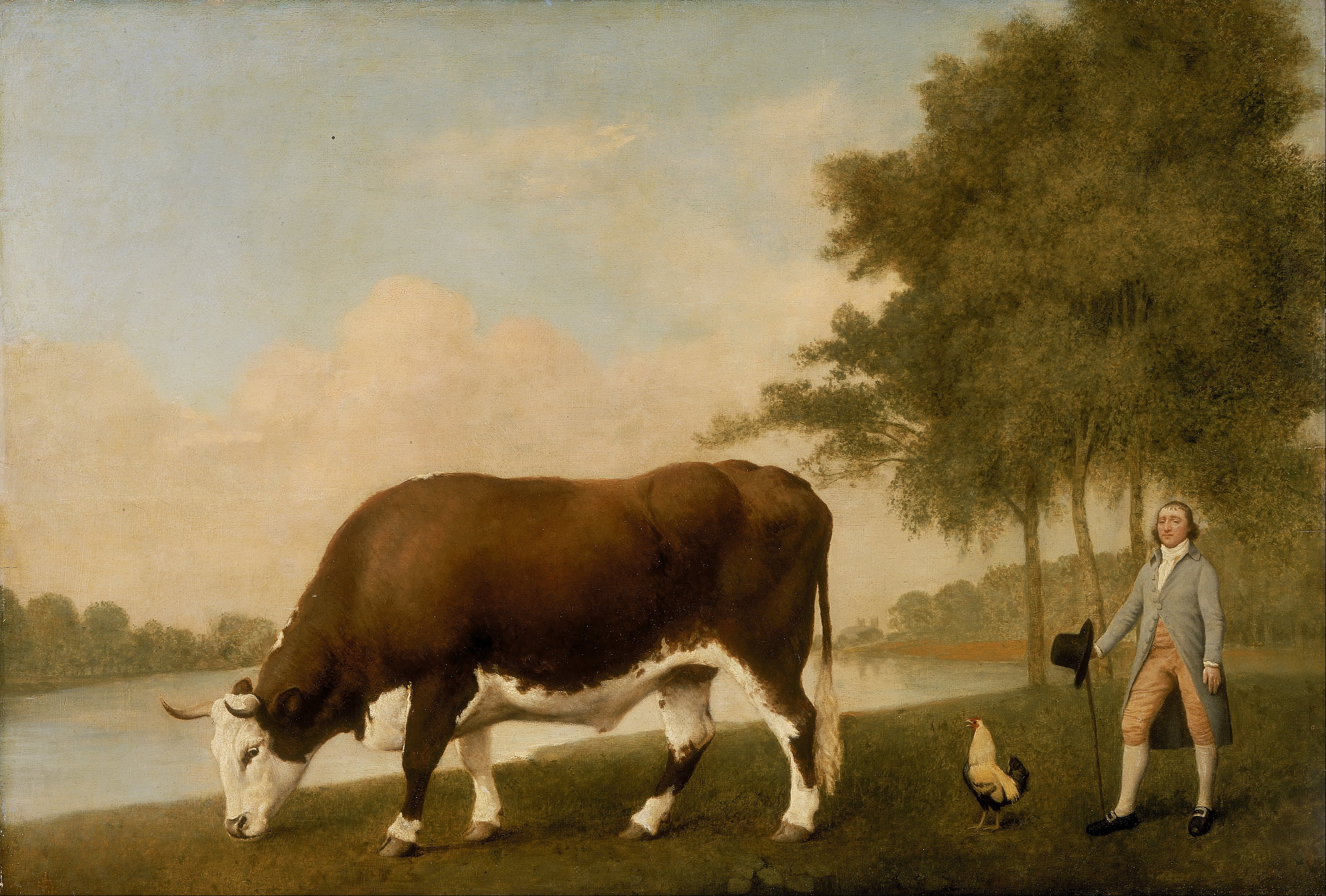
The Lincolnshire Ox by George Stubbs

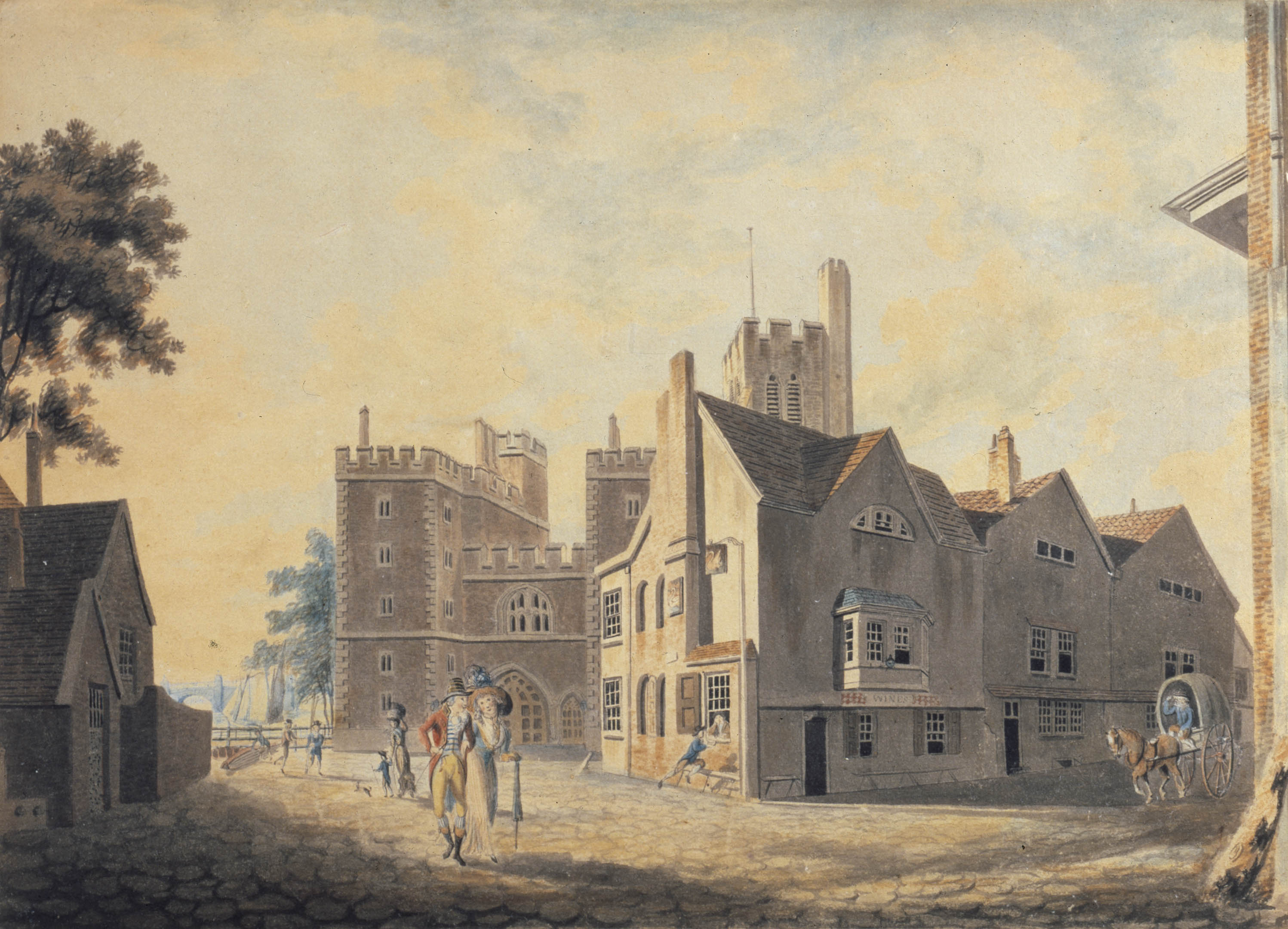
A View of the Archbishop's Palace, Lambeth by J.M.W. Turner

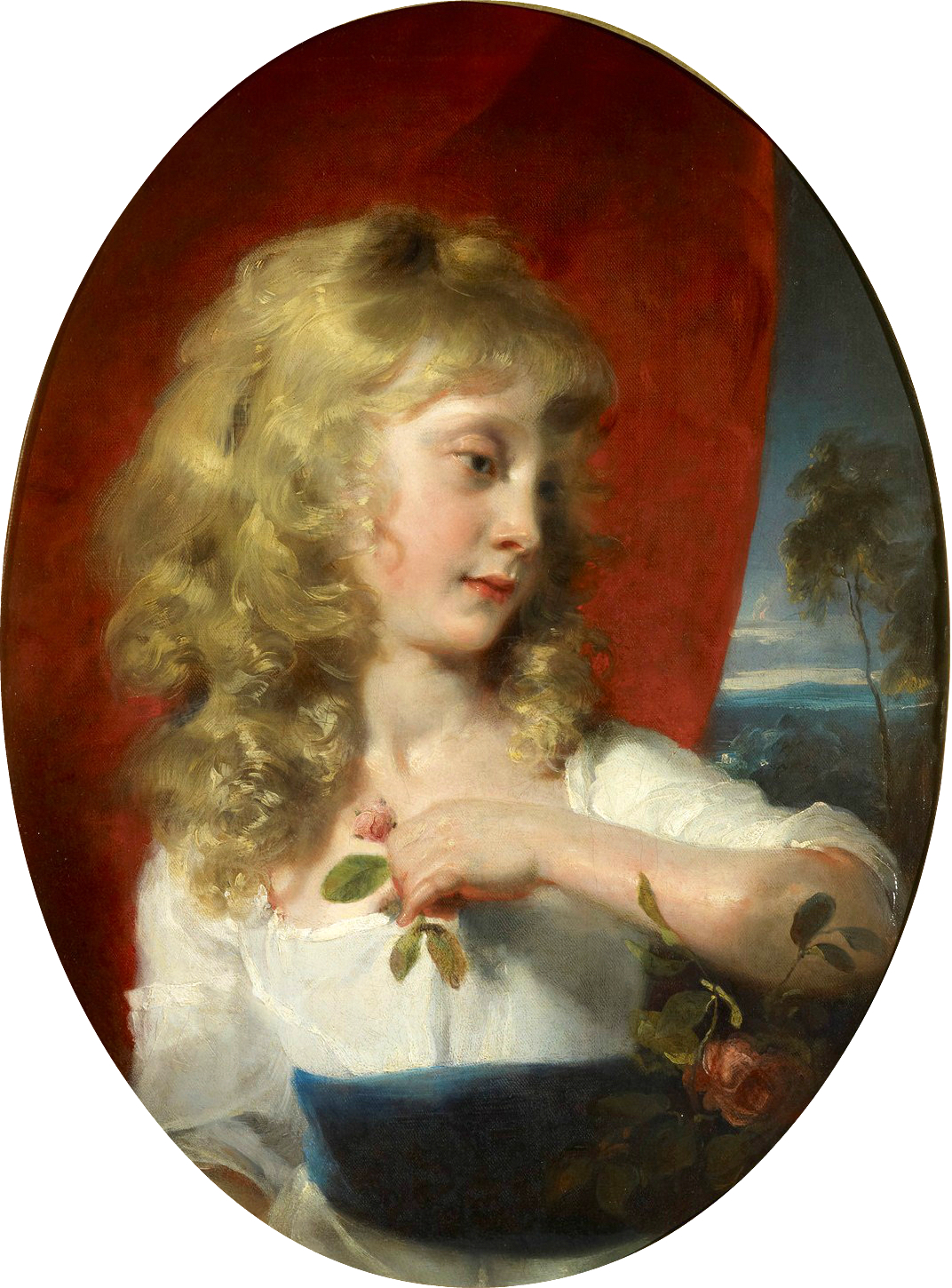
Portrait of Princess Amelia by Thomas Lawrence

== Bibliography ==
- Bailey, Anthony. J.M.W. Turner: Standing in the Sun. Tate Enterprises, 2013.
- Egerton, Judy. George Stubbs, Painter. Yale University Press, 2007.
- Levey, Michael. Sir Thomas Lawrence. Yale University Press, 2005.
- Loughlin, Felicity and & Johnston, Alexandre (ed.) Antiquity and Enlightenment Culture: New Approaches and Perspectives. BRILL, 2020.
- McIntyre, Ian. Joshua Reynolds: The Life and Times of the First President of the Royal Academy. Allen Lane, 2003.
- Smith, E.A. George IV. Yale University Press, 1999.
