= Woman Showing Her Portrait =

Painting by Louis-Léopold Boilly

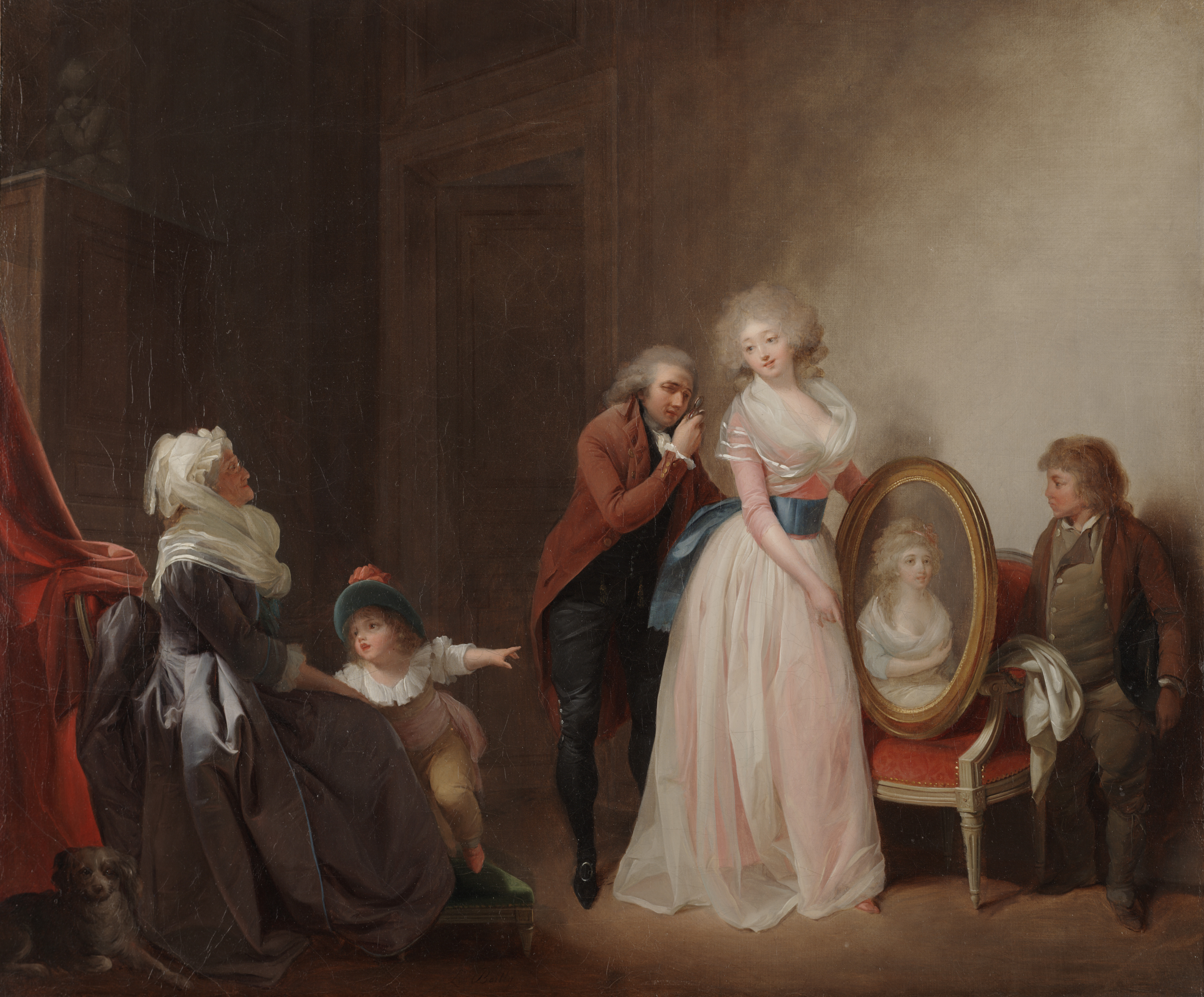
- Artist: Louis-Léopold Boilly
- Year: c.1790
- Type: Oil on canvas, genre painting
- Dimensions: 46.36 cm × 55.56 cm (18.25 in × 21.87 in)
- Location: Dallas Museum of Art, Texas

Woman Showing Her Portrait is a c.1790 genre painting by the French artist Louis-Léopold Boilly. Considerable debate has taken place around the exact meaning of the work. A young woman displays her portrait for inspection by a group, traditionally believed to be family members although there is no evidence to support that. A man, presumably considered a connoisseur of beauty, peers at her through pince-nez.

It may possibly have been commissioned by Boilly's friend the Avignon lawyer Calvet de Lapalun. It is not believed to have been exhibited at any of the Paris Salons. It belonged in the early nineteenth century to the Russian diplomat and art collector Nikolay Yusupov who had visited France three times on diplomatic missions to Versailles in the eighteenth century and returned for a fourth visit in 1808–09 where he acquired many works by leading French painters. It was likely then he purchased both this painting and another by Boilly A Game of Billiards. Today it is on display at the Dallas Museum of Art in Texas, as part of the collection lent by the Michael L. Rosenberg Foundation.

== Bibliography ==
- Bailey, Colin B. The Age of Watteau, Chardin, and Fragonard: Masterpieces of French Genre Painting. Yale University Press, 2003.
- Conisbee, Philip. French Genre Painting in the Eighteenth Century. National Gallery of Art, 2007.
- MacDonald, Heather Eleanor (ed.) French Art of the Eighteenth Century. Yale University Press, 2016.
- Whitlum-Cooper, Francesca. Boilly: Scenes of Parisian Life. National Gallery Company, 2019.
