= Portrait of Queen Charlotte (Lawrence) =

1789 painting by Thomas Lawrence

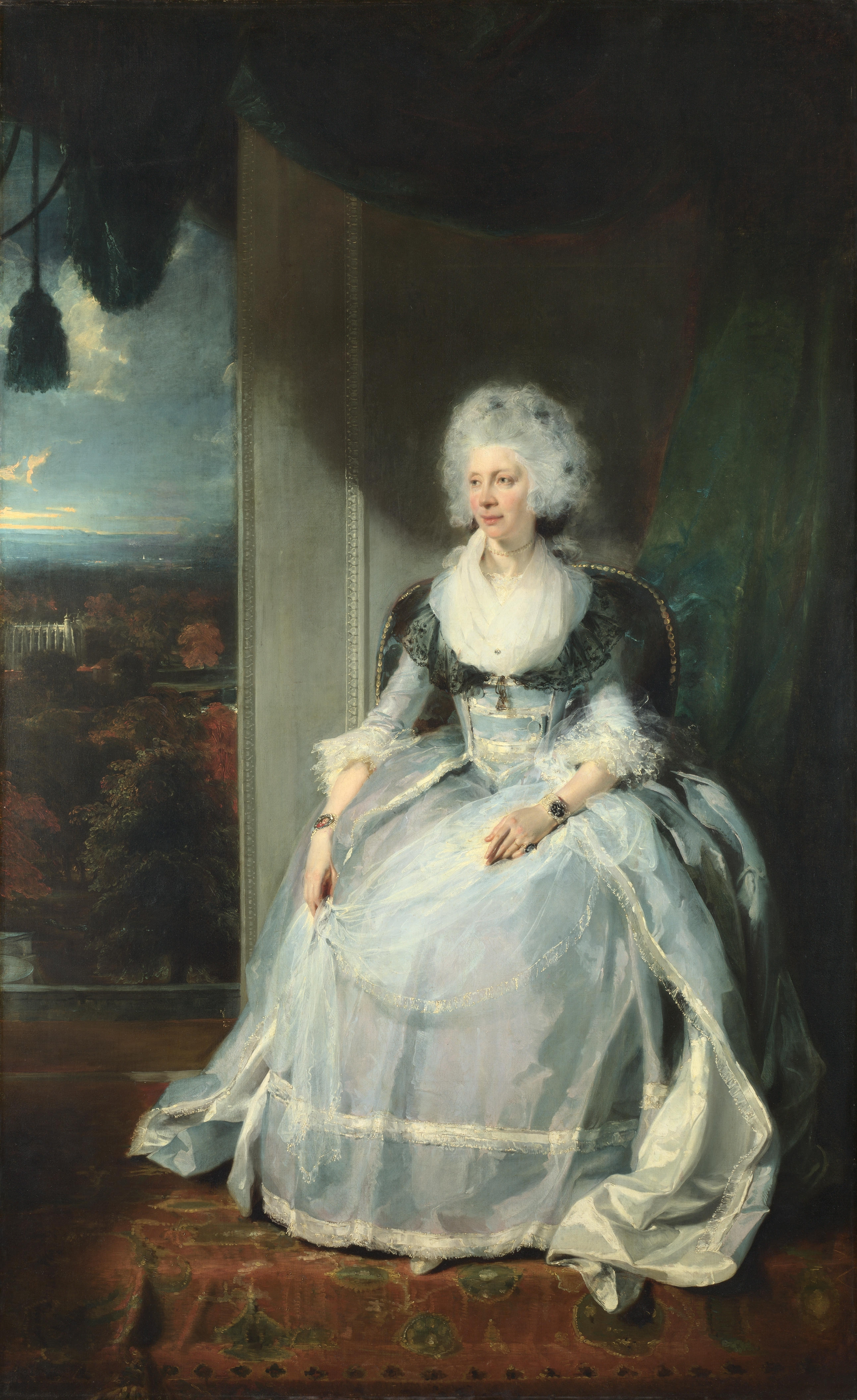
- Artist: Thomas Lawrence
- Year: 1789
- Type: Oil on canvas, portrait painting
- Dimensions: 239.5 cm × 147 cm (94.3 in × 58 in)
- Location: National Gallery, London

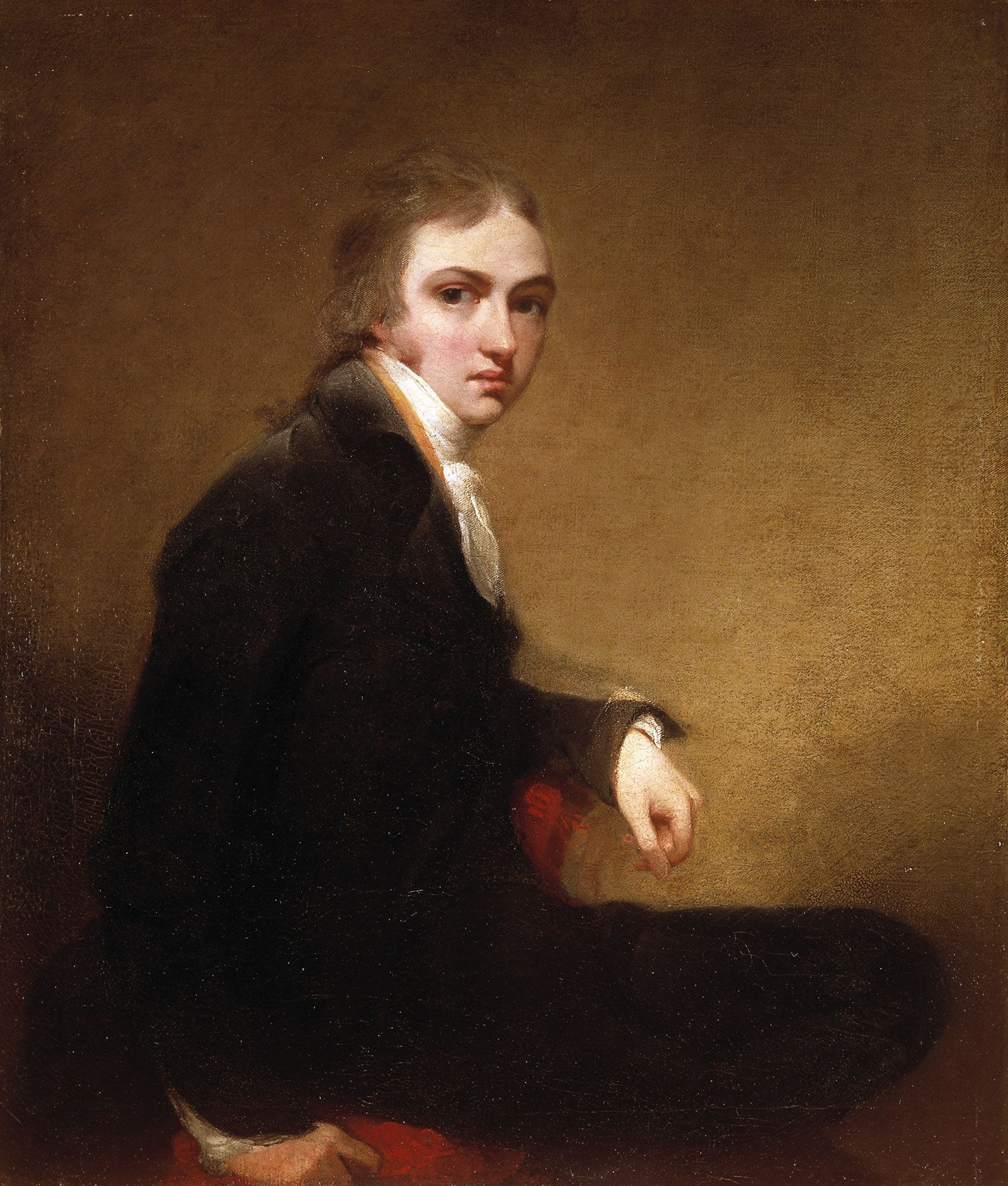
A self-portrait by Lawrence around the time he painted Charlotte.

Portrait of Queen Charlotte is an oil on canvas portrait painting by the English artist Thomas Lawrence, from 1789. It depicts the British queen Charlotte of Mecklenburg-Strelitz, wife of George III.

== History and description ==
Lawrence had emerged as a child prodigy and had been painting society portraits in Bath for a number of years before relocating to London and beginning to exhibit at the Royal Academy. Lawrence was twenty when he painted Queen Charlotte. It represented a major commission for him and the first time he painted a member of the British royal family. It followed the Regency Crisis of 1788 when an outbreak of mental illness nearly led to her husband, King George III, being deprived of his constitutional powers, and the strain is considered to be reflected in the portrait. He painted her at Windsor Castle and nearby Eton College can be seen in the background.

It was exhibited at the Royal Academy Exhibition of 1790 at Somerset House the following year. Although the portrait was considered a resounding success neither the King nor Queen cared for it and it was not acquired for the Royal Collection. Within a few years Lawrence would be Britain's pre-eminent portrait painter, known particularly for his depictions of the Regency era elite and was commissioned by Charlotte's son George to paint European leaders following the victory over Napoleon. His painting of Charlotte is now in the collection of the National Gallery in London.

Regarding the debate over Charlotte's possible African ancestry, it has been cited as a work that portrays no suggestion of this in contrast to other depictions such as Allan Ramsay's 1761 coronation portrait.

== See also ==
- Portrait of Queen Charlotte, a 1768 portrait by Nathaniel Dance-Holland
- Portrait of George IV, 1821 portrait by Lawrence of Charlotte's son in his coronation robes

== Bibliography ==
- Chilvers, Ian. The Oxford Dictionary of Art and Artists. ISBN 0191024171. Oxford University Press, 2015.
- Haehnel, Birgit & Ulz, Melanie. Slavery in Art and Literature: Approaches to Trauma, Memory and Visuality. ISBN 3865962432. Frank & Timme, 2010.
- Norrie, Aidan, Harris, Carolyn, Laynesmith, J.L., Messer, Danna R. and Woodacre, Elena (ed.) Hanoverian to Windsor Consorts: Power, Influence, and Dynasty. ISBN 3031128281. Springer Nature, 2023.
- Levey, Michael. Sir Thomas Lawrence. ISBN 0300109989. Yale University Press, 2005.
