= Lambeth Palace (painting) =

Painting by J. M. W. Turner

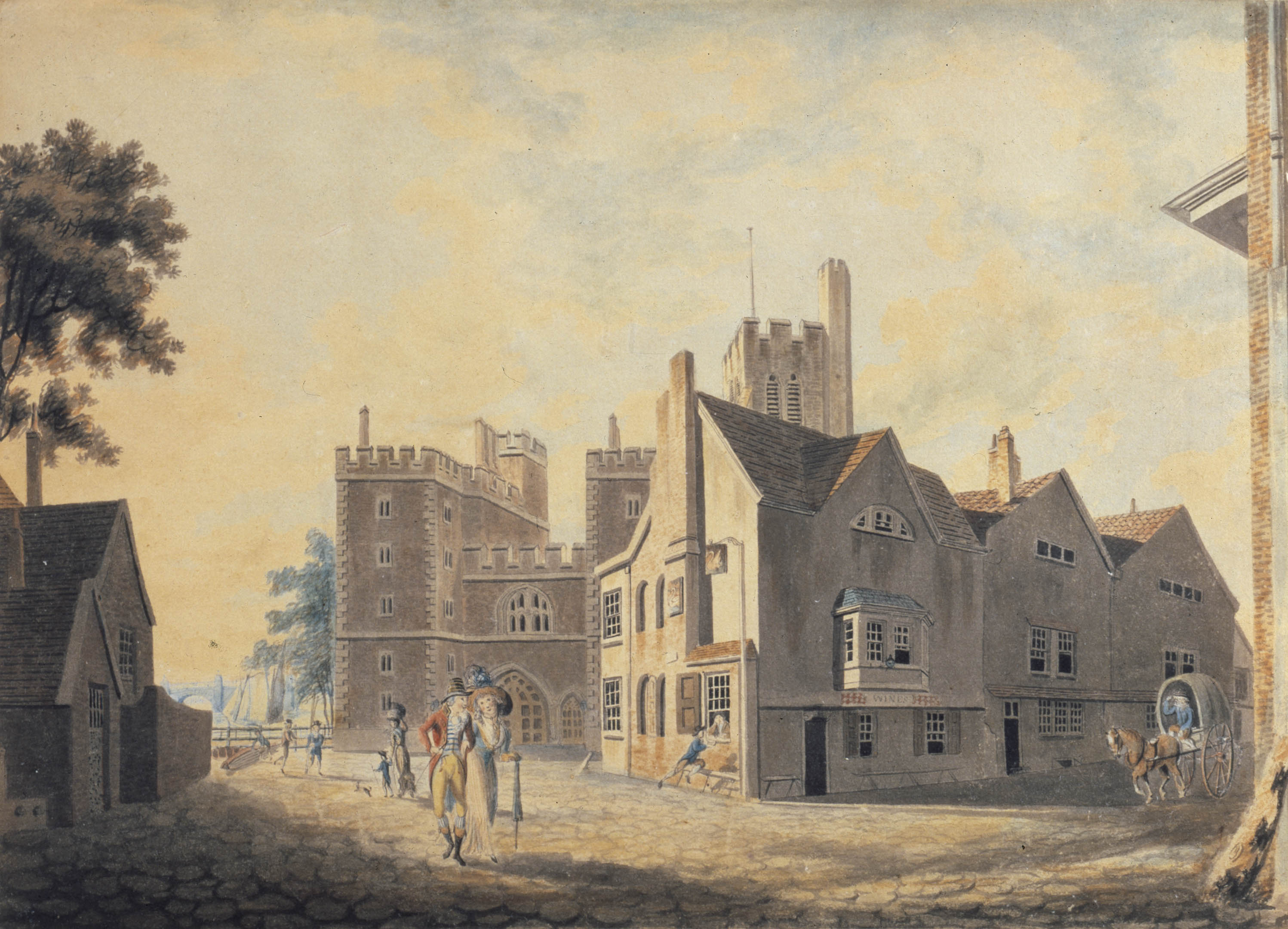
- Artist: J. M. W. Turner
- Year: 1790
- Type: Watercolour
- Dimensions: 26.7 cm × 38.1 cm (10.5 in × 15 in)
- Location: Indianapolis Museum of Art, Indiana
- Website: collections.discovernewfields.org...49351

A View of the Archbishop's Palace, Lambeth is a 1790 watercolour by J. M. W. Turner, one of England's greatest and most influential painters. Turner presented this watercolour to the Royal Academy Exhibition in 1790 when he was 15 years old and is his first work exhibited at that annual event. It features Lambeth Palace, the residence of the Archbishop of Canterbury, with the Swan Inn on the right. The painting shows a precocious talent to control light and shade.

The work required working out difficult perspective projections because the buildings aligned at different angles, a challenging task even for an experienced draughtsman. Turner seems to be trying to impress with his precocious drawing abilities. (Note: In 1811 he would become Professor of Perspective.)

The work was influenced by the style of Thomas Malton (1748–1804), a draughstman of architectural views who taught Turner. Decades later he would say that Malton had been his "real master."

Today the painting is in the Indianapolis Museum of Art in Indiana, having been acquired in 1972.

== See also ==
- List of paintings by J. M. W. Turner

== Bibliography ==
- Bailey, A. (2013). J. M. W. Turner: Standing in the Sun. London: Tate Enterprises Ltd.
- Hamilton, James (2007). Turner. New York: Random House Trade Paperbacks. ISBN 978-0-8129-6791-3.
- Lindsay, Jack (1966). Turner: His Life and Work. Greenwich, Connecticut: New Graphic Society.
- Moorby, N. (2025). Turner and Constable: Art, Life, and Landscape. London: Yale University Press. ISBN 978-0300275810.
- Shanes, Eric (2004). Turner: The Life and Masterworks (Rev. and updated 3rd ed.). New York: Parkstone Press. ISBN 978-1-85995-905-3.
