= Portrait of Richard Arkwright (Brown) =

Painting by Mather Brown

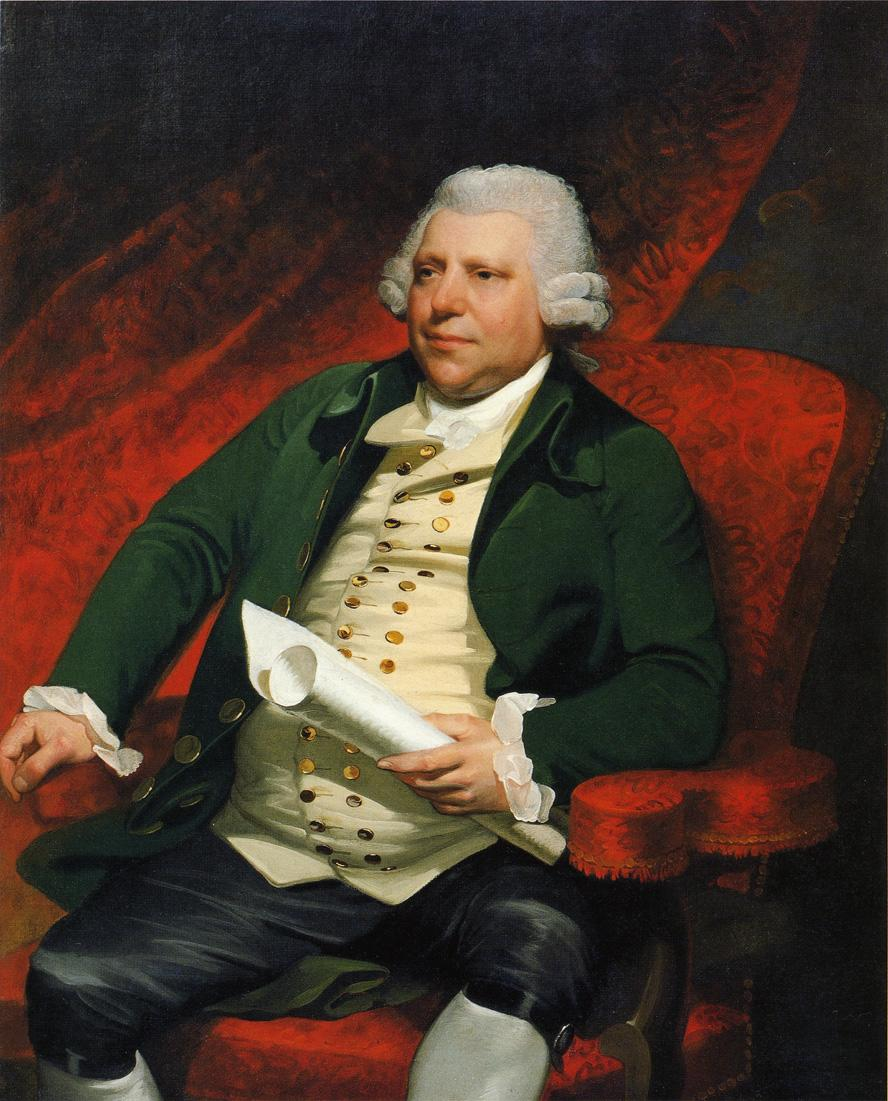
- Artist: Mather Brown
- Year: 1790
- Type: Oil on canvas, portrait painting
- Dimensions: 127.9 cm × 102.5 cm (50.4 in × 40.4 in)
- Location: New Britain Museum of American Art; Connecticut

Portrait of Richard Arkwright is a 1790 portrait painting by the Anglo-American artist Mather Brown. It depicts the English businessmen Richard Arkwright, a major figure in the Industrial Revolution. Arkwright commissioned the painting for his London residence in Adam Street.

Brown settled in London and during his early career enjoyed great success with fashionable portraiture and history paintings for the Boydell Shakespeare Gallery. The painting is now in the Museum of American Art in New Britain, Connecticut.

== See also ==
- Portrait of Richard Arkwright, a contemporary painting by Joseph Wright of Derby

== Bibliography ==
- Evans, Dorinda. Mather Brown, Early American Artist in England. Wesleyan University Press, 1982.
- Fitton, R.S. The Arkwrights: Spinners of Fortune. Manchester University Press, 1989.
