= Portrait of Richard Arkwright (Wright) =

Painting by Joseph Wright of Derby

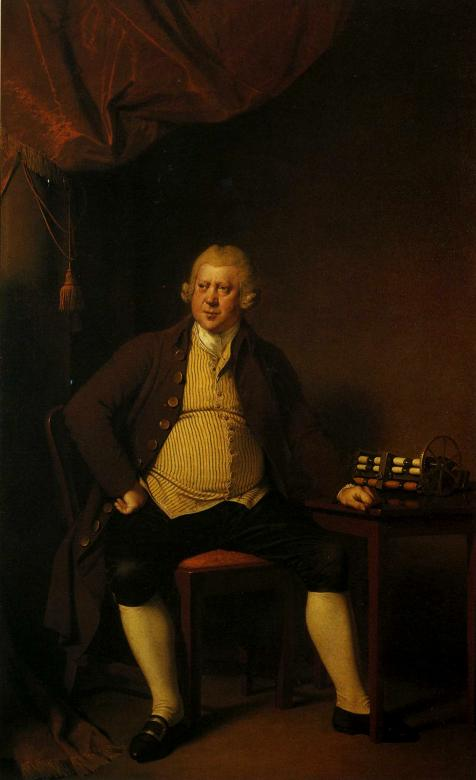
- Artist: Joseph Wright of Derby
- Year: 1790
- Type: Oil on canvas, portrait painting
- Dimensions: 125 cm × 99 cm (49 in × 39 in)
- Location: Derby Museum and Art Gallery, Derby

Portrait of Richard Arkwright is a 1790 portrait painting by the British artist Joseph Wright of Derby. It depicts the pioneer of the Industrial Revolution Richard Arkwright.

The same year Wright painted a Portrait of Jedediah Strutt featuring Arkwright's former business partner. The painting has been on display at the Derby Museum and Art Gallery in Wright's home city since 1993. Wright also produced portraits of Arkwright's son Richard and his family.

Arkwright's portrait was also painted by the American artist Mather Brown. His Portrait of Richard Arkwright shows the industrialist in a more fashionable style.

== Bibliography ==
- Bamford, Lucy & Wallis, Jonathan. Joseph Wright of Derby. Derby Museums, 2017.
- Cosgrove Denis & Daniel's, Stephen The Iconography of Landscape: Essays on the Symbolic Representation, Design and Use of Past Environments. Cambridge University Press, 1988.
- Leach, Stephen H. Joseph Wright and the Final Farewell. Cambridge Scholars Publishing, 2022.
