= English art =

Overview of the art of England

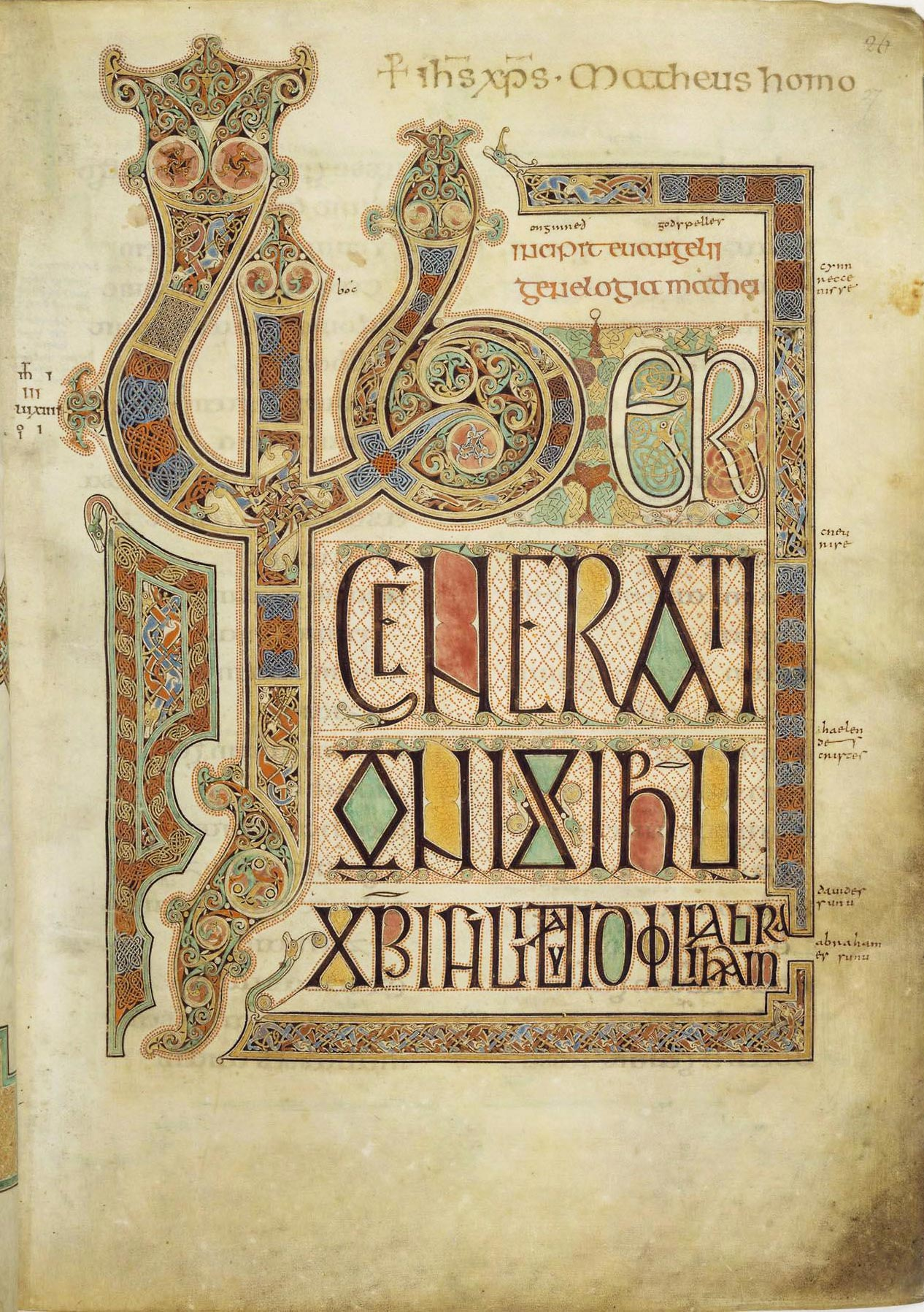
Folio 27r from the 8th-century Lindisfarne Gospels contains the incipit from the Gospel of Matthew.

English art is the body of visual arts made in England. England has Europe's earliest and northernmost ice-age cave art. Prehistoric art in England largely corresponds with art made elsewhere in contemporary Britain, but early medieval Anglo-Saxon art saw the development of a distinctly English style, and English art continued thereafter to have a distinct character. English art made after the formation in 1707 of the Kingdom of Great Britain may be regarded in most respects simultaneously as art of the United Kingdom.

Medieval English painting, mainly religious, had a strong national tradition and was influential in Europe. The English Reformation, which was antipathetic to art, not only brought this tradition to an abrupt stop but resulted in the destruction of almost all wall-paintings. Only illuminated manuscripts now survive in good numbers.

There is in the art of the English Renaissance a strong interest in portraiture, and the portrait miniature was more popular in England than anywhere else. English Renaissance sculpture was mainly architectural and for monumental tombs. Interest in English landscape painting had begun to develop by the time of the 1707 Act of Union.

Substantive definitions of English art have been attempted by, among others, art scholar Nikolaus Pevsner (in his 1956 book The Englishness of English Art), art historian Roy Strong (in his 2000 book The Spirit of Britain: A narrative history of the arts) and critic Peter Ackroyd (in his 2002 book Albion).

== Earliest art ==
The earliest English art – also Europe's earliest and northernmost cave art – is located at Creswell Crags in Derbyshire, estimated at between 13,000 and 15,000 years old. In 2003, more than 80 engravings and bas-reliefs, depicting deer, bison, horses, and what may be birds or bird-headed people were found there. The famous, large ritual landscape of Stonehenge dates from the Neolithic period; around 2600 BC. From around 2150 BC, the Beaker people learned how to make bronze, and used both tin and gold. They became skilled in metal refining and their works of art, placed in graves or sacrificial pits have survived. In the Iron Age, a new art style arrived as Celtic culture and spread across the British isles. Though metalwork, especially gold ornaments, was still important, stone and most likely wood were also used. This style continued into the Roman period, beginning in the 1st century BC, and found a renaissance in the Medieval period. The arrival of the Romans brought the Classical style of which many monuments have survived, especially funerary monuments, statues and busts. They also brought glasswork and mosaics. In the 4th century, a new element was introduced as the first Christian art was made in Britain. Several mosaics with Christian symbols and pictures have been preserved. England boasts some remarkable prehistoric hill figures; a famous example is the Uffington White Horse in Oxfordshire, which "for more than 3,000 years ... has been jealously guarded as a masterpiece of minimalist art."

=== Earliest art: gallery ===
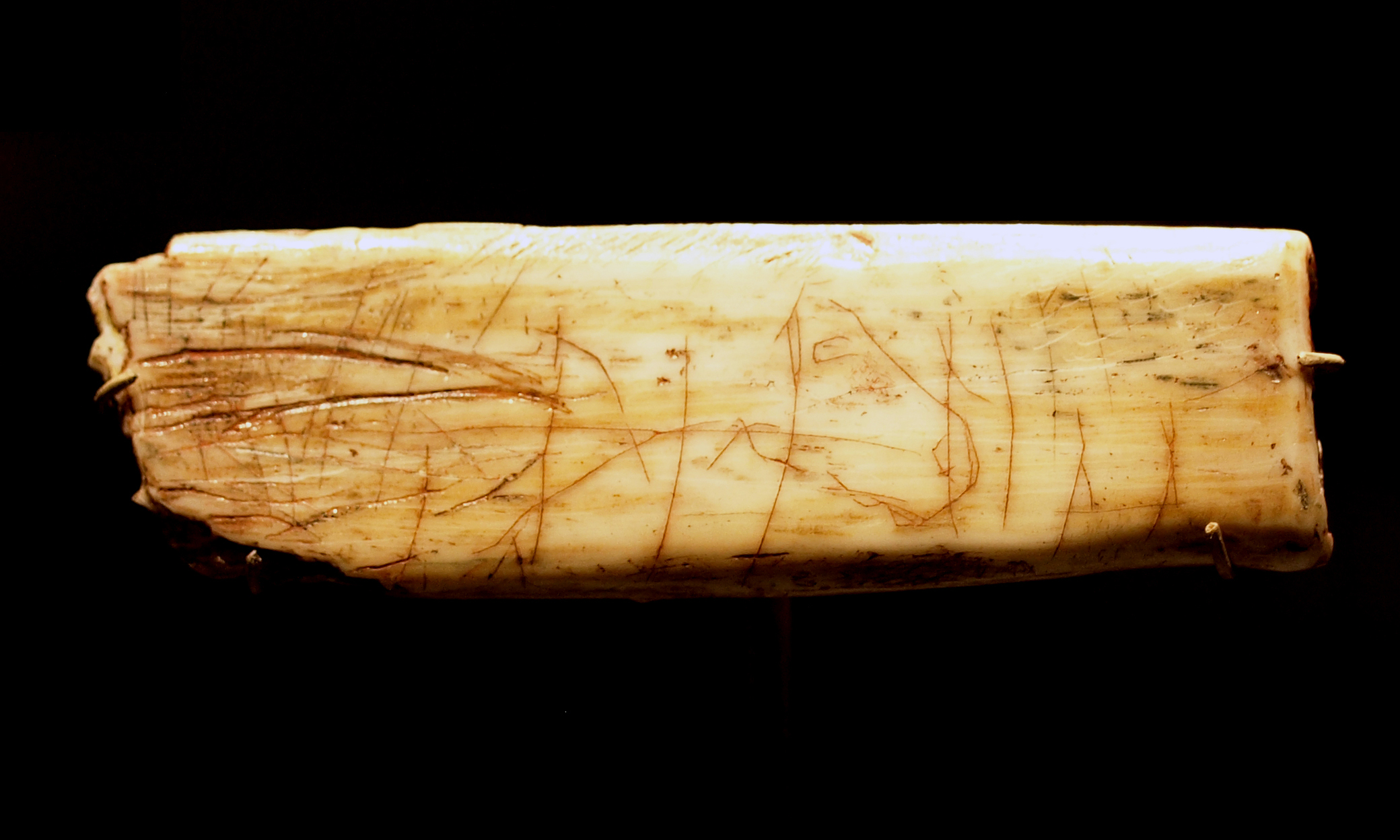
Ochre horse illustration from the Creswell Crags; 11000-13000 BC.

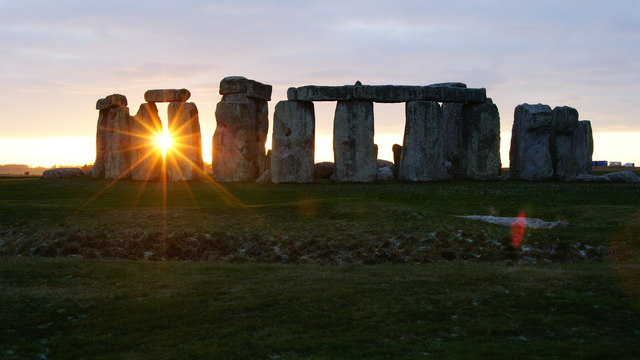
Stonehenge; 2600 BC.

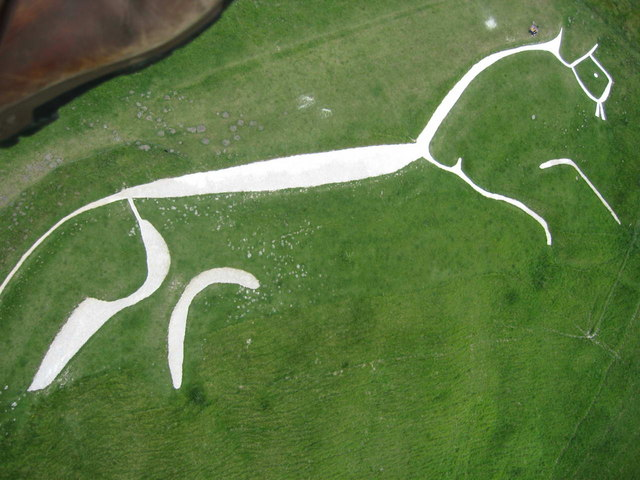
Uffington White Horse; c. 1000 BC.

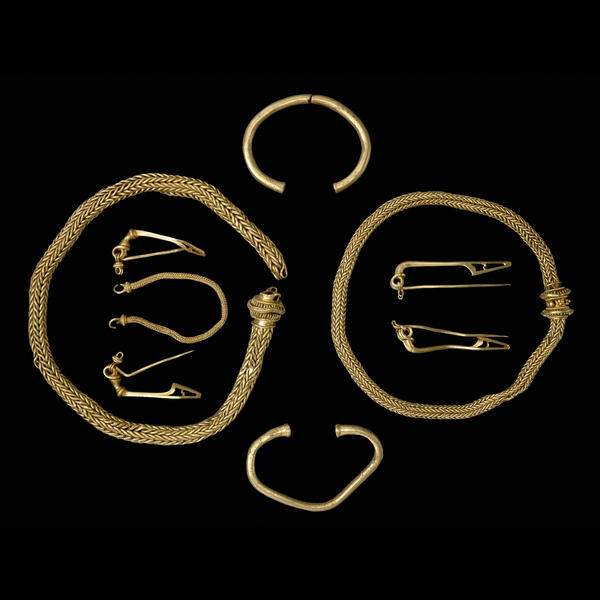
Winchester Hoard items; 75-25 BC.

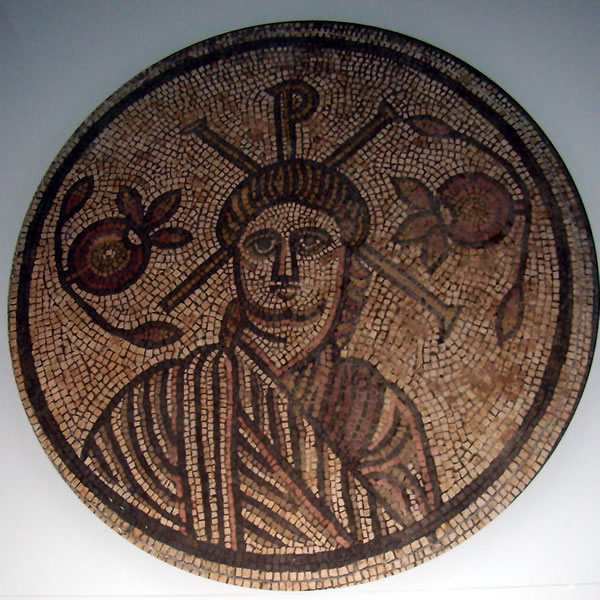
Hinton St Mary Mosaic; 4th century AD.

== Medieval art ==
After Roman rule, Anglo-Saxon art brought the incorporation of Germanic traditions, as may be seen in the metalwork of Sutton Hoo. Anglo-Saxon sculpture was outstanding for its time, at least in the small works in ivory or bone which are almost all that survive. Especially in Northumbria, the Insular art style shared across the British Isles produced the finest work being produced in Europe, until the Viking raids and invasions largely suppressed the movement; the Book of Lindisfarne is one example certainly produced in Northumbria. Anglo-Saxon art developed a very sophisticated variation on contemporary Continental styles, seen especially in metalwork and illuminated manuscripts such as the Benedictional of St. Æthelwold. None of the large-scale Anglo-Saxon paintings and sculptures that we know existed have survived.

By the first half of the 11th century, English art benefited from lavish patronage by a wealthy Anglo-Saxon elite, who valued above all works in precious metals. but the Norman Conquest in 1066 brought a sudden halt to this art boom, and instead works were melted down or removed to Normandy. The so-called Bayeux Tapestry - the large, English-made, embroidered cloth depicting events leading up to the Norman conquest - dates to the late 11th century. Some decades after the Norman conquest, manuscript painting in England was soon again among the best of any in Europe; in Romanesque works such as the Winchester Bible and the St. Albans Psalter, and then in early Gothic ones like the Tickhill Psalter. The best-known English illuminator of the period is Matthew Paris (c. 1200–1259). Some of the rare surviving examples of English medieval panel paintings, such as the Westminster Retable and Wilton Diptych, are of the highest quality. From the late 14th century to the early 16th century, England had a considerable industry in Nottingham alabaster reliefs for mid-market altarpieces and small statues, which were exported across Northern Europe. Another art form introduced through the church was stained glass, which was also adopted for secular uses.

=== Medieval art: gallery ===
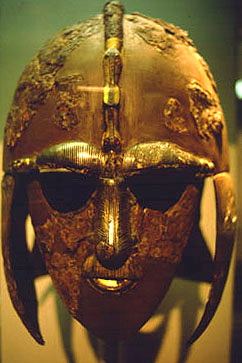
Sutton Hoo helmet; c. 625.

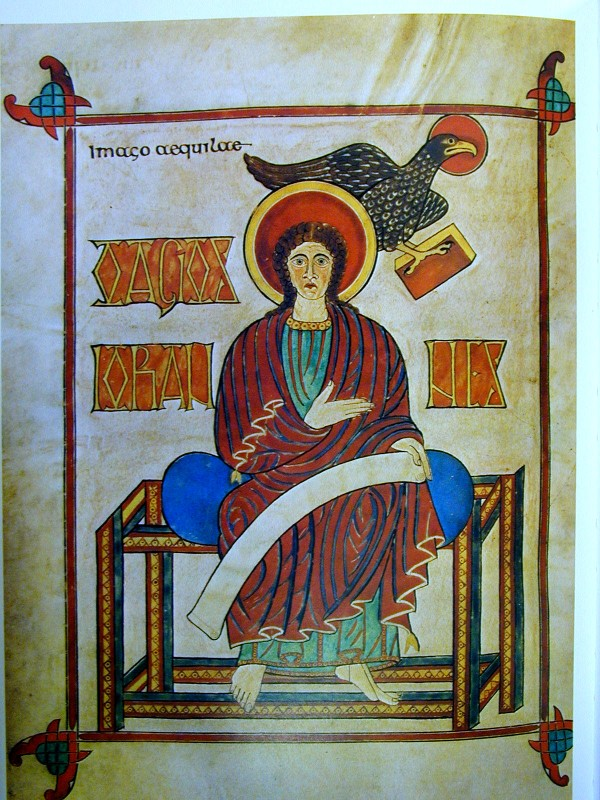
Lindisfarne Gospels; c. 700.

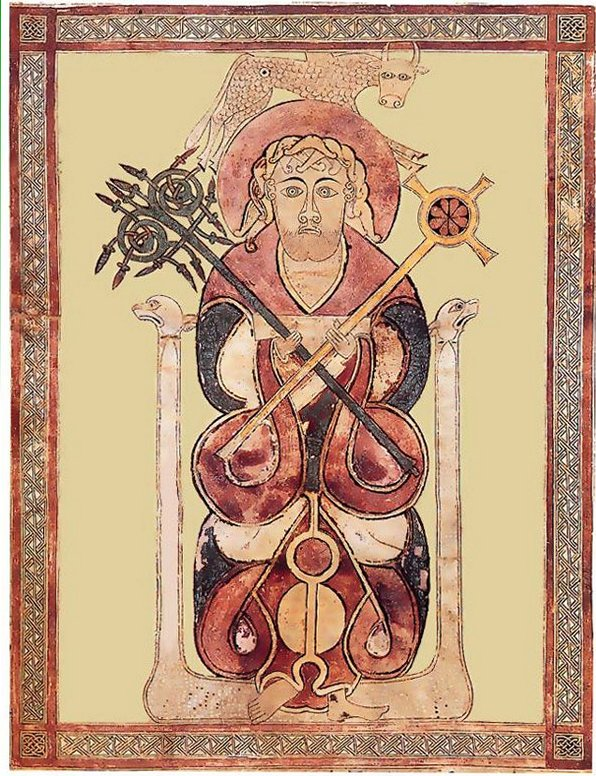
Lichfield Gospels; c. 730.

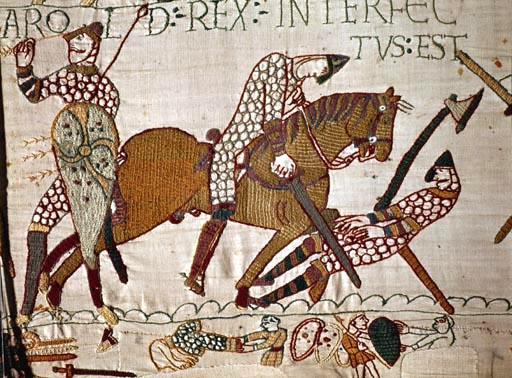
Detail from the so-called Bayeux Tapestry; c. 1070s.

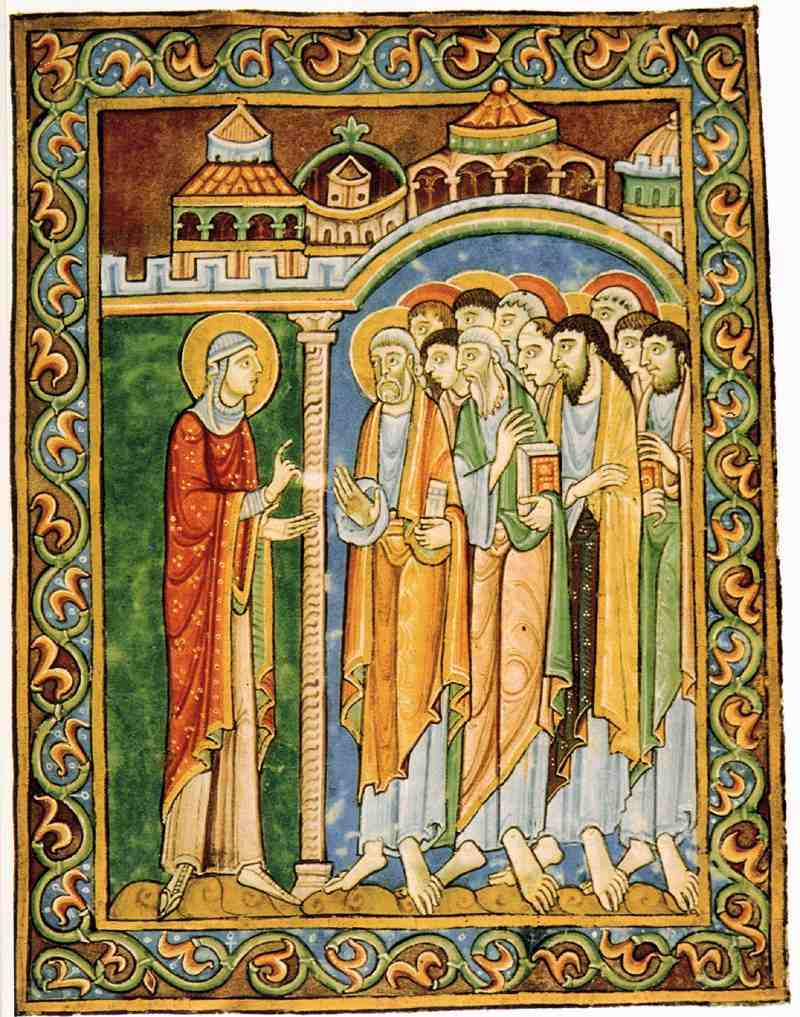
Mary Magdalen announcing the Resurrection, from the St. Albans Psalter; 1120–1145.

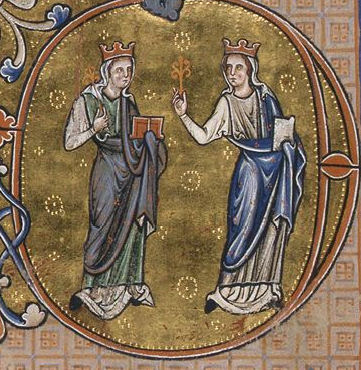
The Fitzwilliam Peterborough Psalter; before 1222.

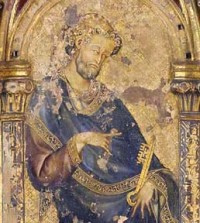
The Westminster Retable; c. 1270s.

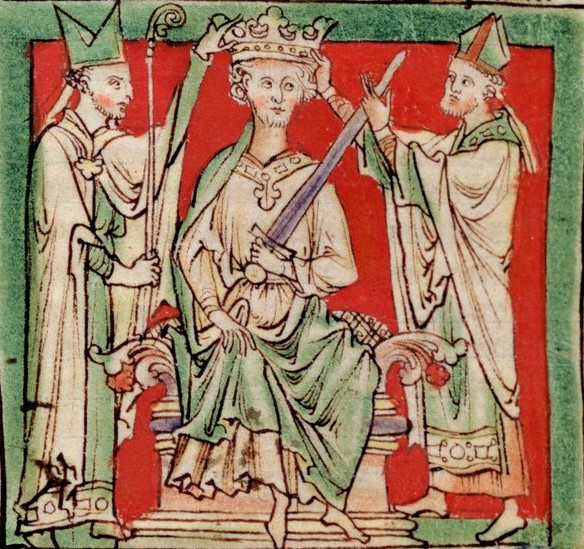
King Arthur in Matthew Paris's Flores Historiarum; 1306–1326.

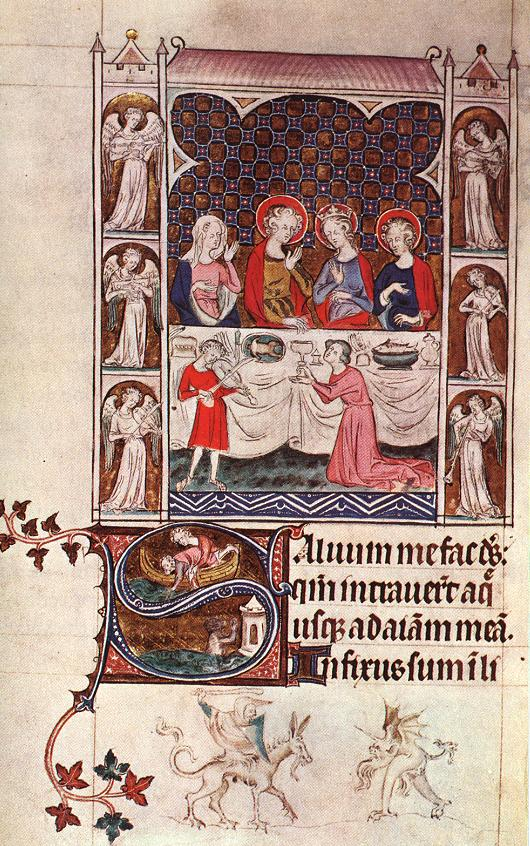
The Queen Mary Psalter; 1310–1320.

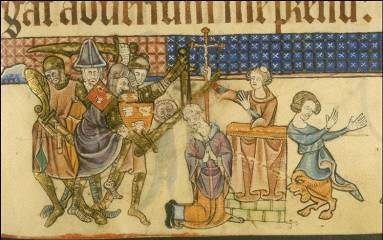
Becket's death in the Luttrell Psalter; 1320–1345.

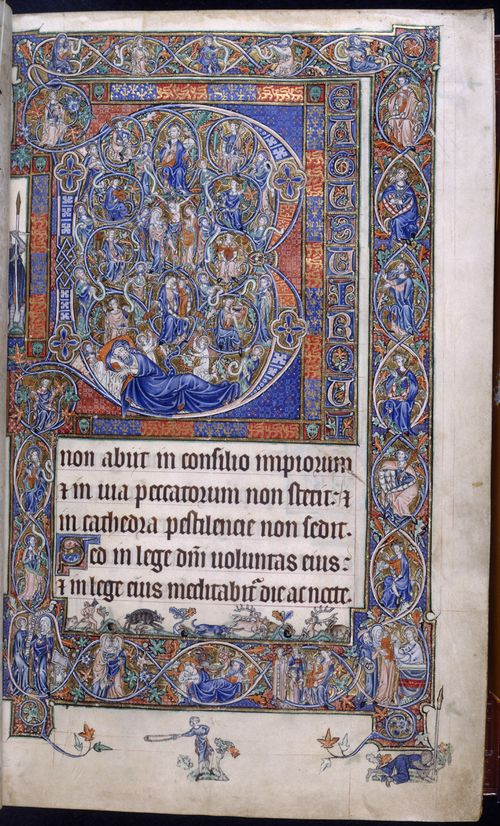
Gorleston Psalter; 14th century.

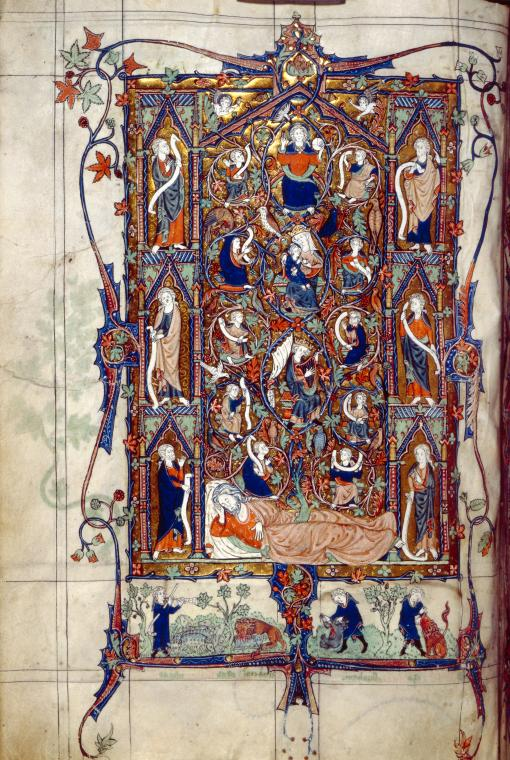
Tickhill Psalter; 14th century.

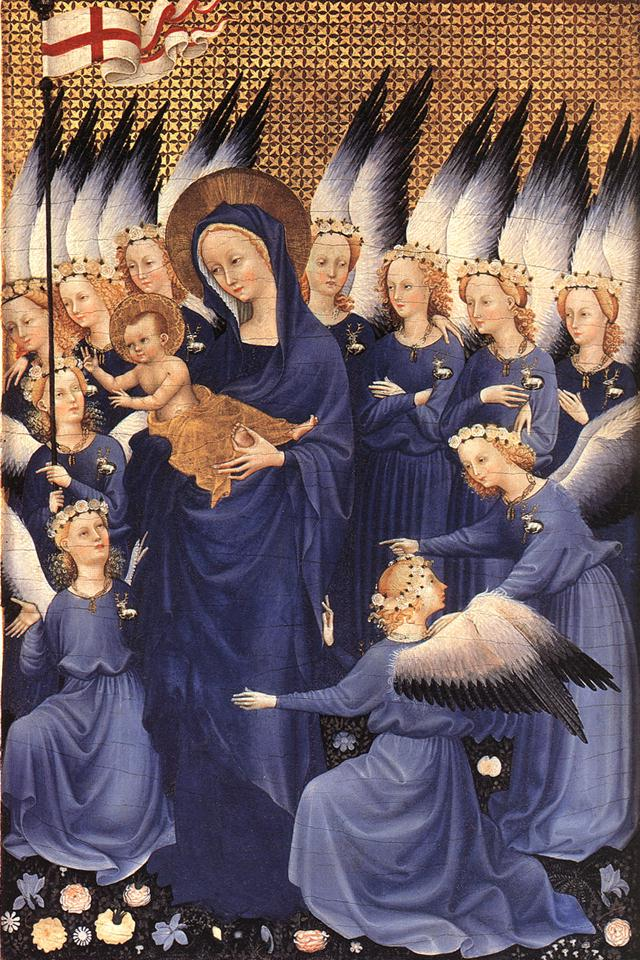
The Wilton Diptych (right); c. 1395–1399.

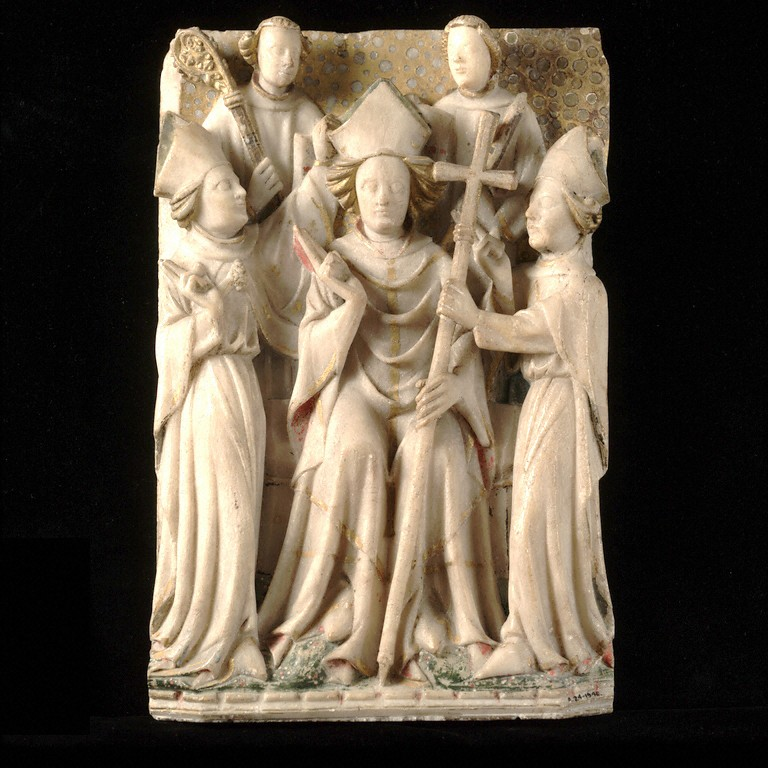
Nottingham Alabaster of St Thomas Becket; 15th century.

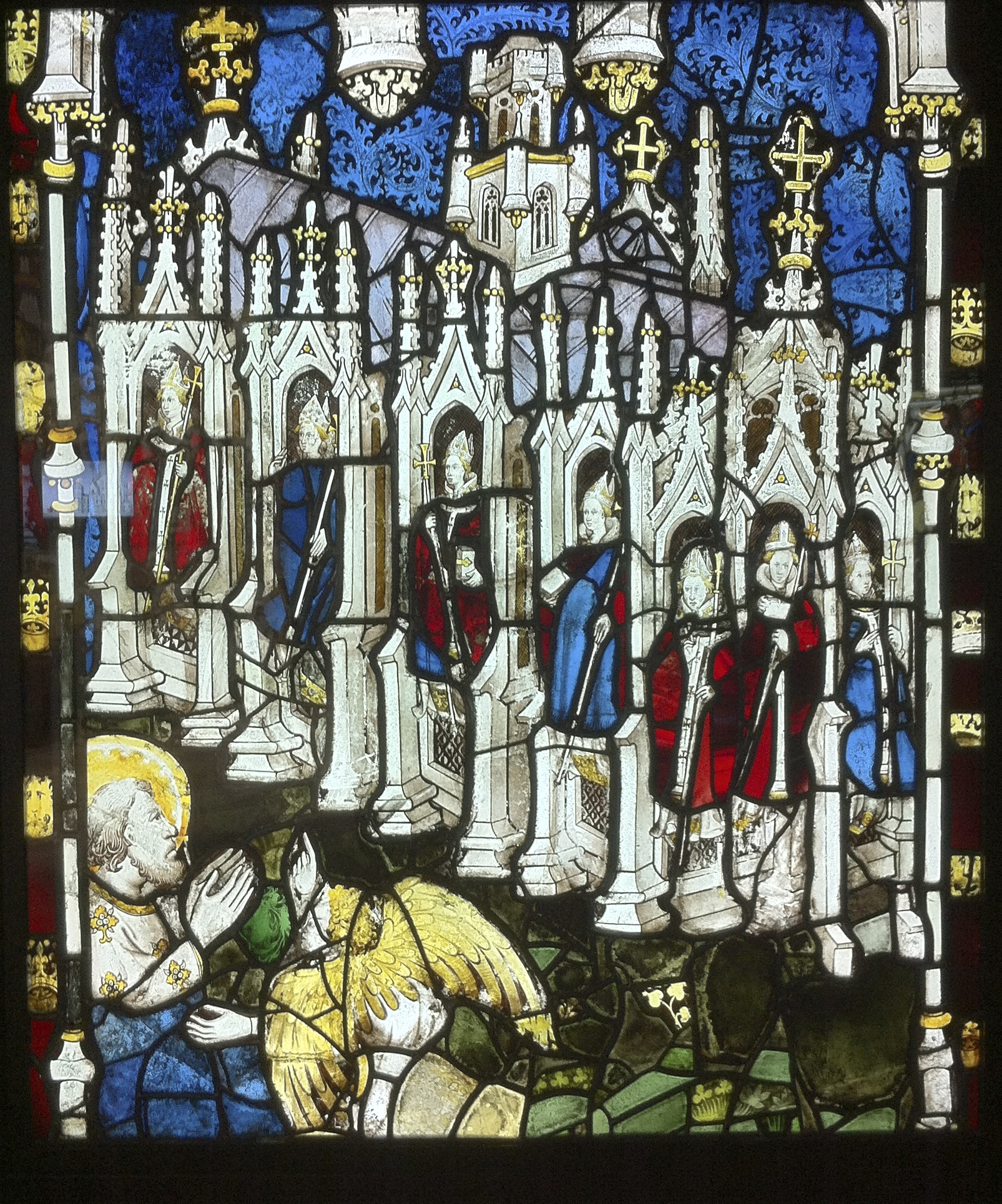
Stained glass at York Minster by John Thornton (fl. 1405–1433).

== 16th and 17th centuries ==
Nicholas Hilliard (c. 1547–7 January 1619) – "the first native-born genius of English painting" – began a strong English tradition in the portrait miniature. The tradition was continued by Hilliard's pupil Isaac Oliver (c. 1565–bur. 2 October 1617), whose French Huguenot parents had escaped to England in the artist's childhood.

Other notable English artists across the period include: Nathaniel Bacon (1585–1627); John Bettes the Elder (active c. 1531–1570) and John Bettes the Younger (died 1616); George Gower (c. 1540–1596), William Larkin (early 1580s–1619), and Robert Peake the Elder (c. 1551–1619). The artists of the Tudor court and their successors until the early 18th century included a number of influential imported talents: Hans Holbein the Younger, Anthony van Dyck, Peter Paul Rubens, Orazio Gentileschi and his daughter Artemisia, Sir Peter Lely (a naturalised English subject from 1662), and Sir Godfrey Kneller (a naturalised English subject by the time of his 1691 knighthood).

The 17th century saw a number of significant English painters of full-size portraits, most notably William Dobson 1611 (bapt. 1611–bur. 1646); others include Cornelius Johnson (bapt. 1593–bur. 1661) and Robert Walker (1599–1658). Samuel Cooper (1609–1672) was an accomplished miniaturist in Hilliard's tradition, as was his brother Alexander Cooper (1609–1660), and their uncle, John Hoskins (1589/1590–1664). Other notable portraitists of the period include: Thomas Flatman (1635–1688), Richard Gibson (1615–1690), the dissolute John Greenhill (c. 1644–1676), John Riley (1646–1691), and John Michael Wright (1617–1694). Francis Barlow (c. 1626–1704) is known as "the father of British sporting painting"; he was England's first wildlife painter, beginning a tradition that reached a high-point a century later, in the work of George Stubbs (1724–1806). English women began painting professionally in the 17th century; notable examples include Joan Carlile (c. 1606–79), and Mary Beale (née Cradock; 1633–1699).

In the first half of the 17th century the English nobility became important collectors of European art, led by King Charles I and Thomas Howard, 21st Earl of Arundel. By the end of the 17th century, the Grand Tour – a trip of Europe giving exposure to the cultural legacy of classical antiquity and the Renaissance – was de rigueur for wealthy young Englishmen.

=== 16th and 17th centuries: gallery ===
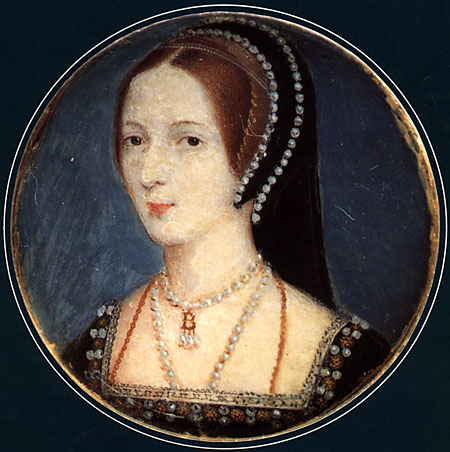
Hoskins's miniature of Anne Boleyn (c. 1501–1536); n.d.

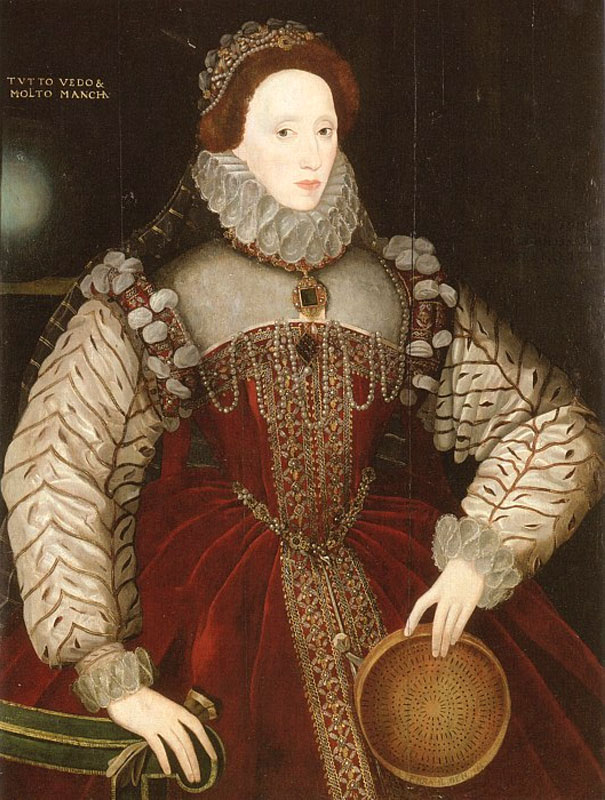
George Gower's sieve portrait of Elizabeth I; 1579.

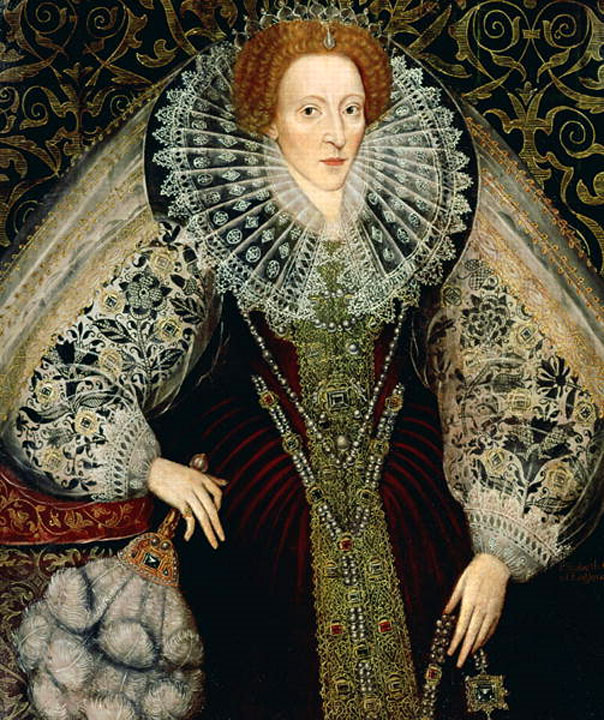
John Bettes the Younger's portrait of Elizabeth I; c. 1585.

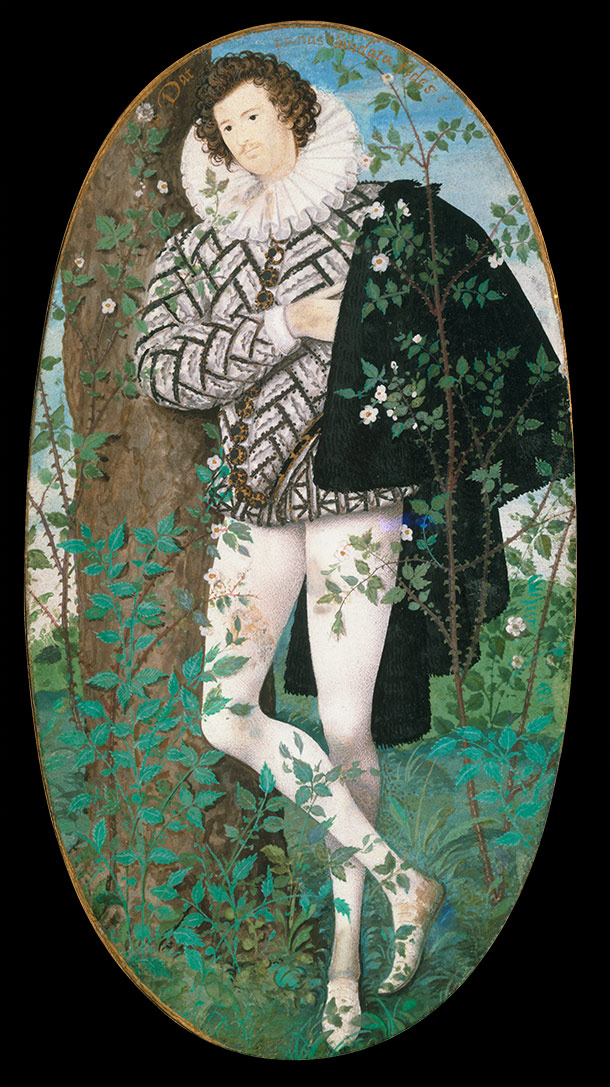
Nicholas Hilliard's Young Man Among Roses; 1587.

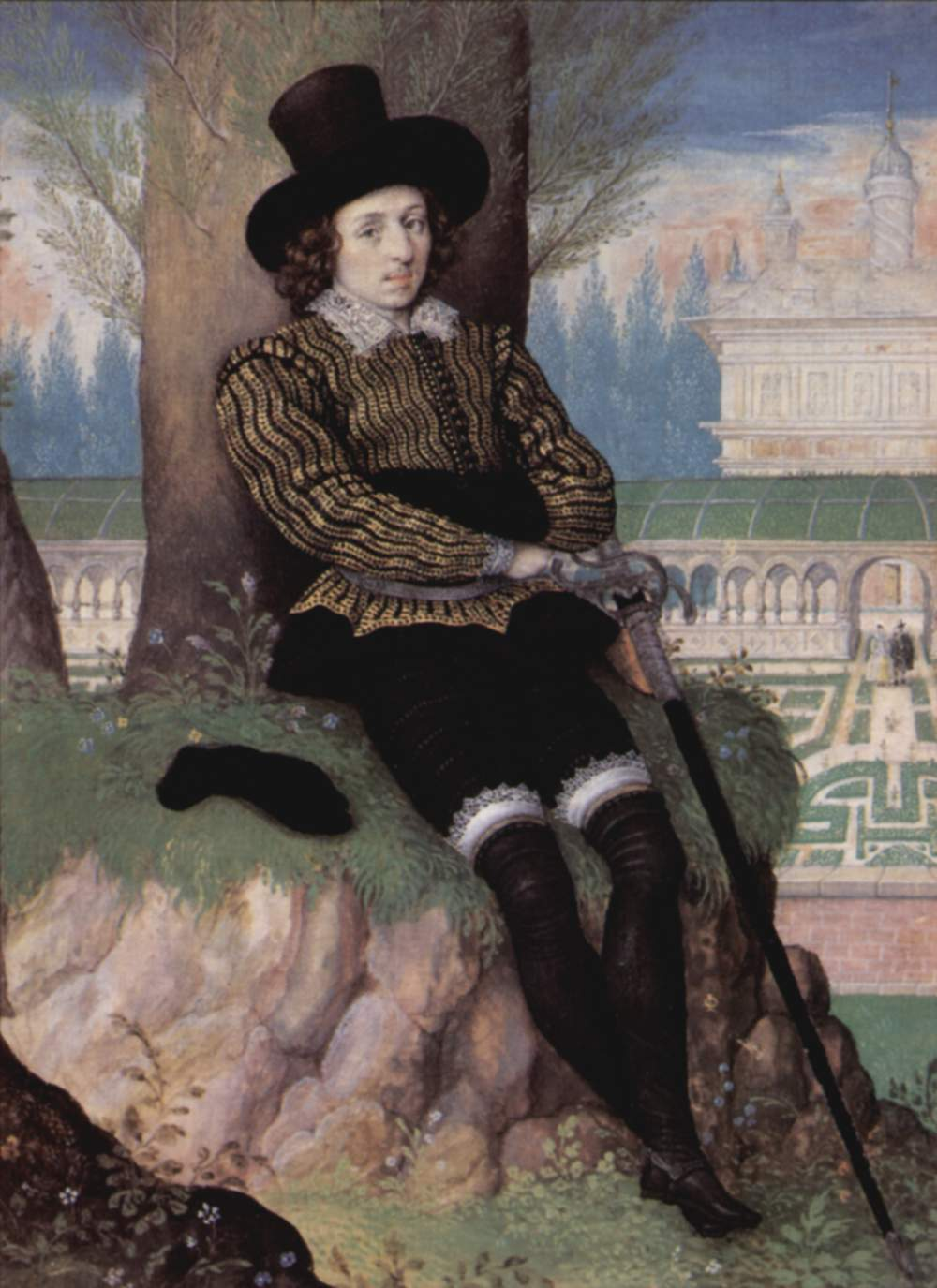
Isaac Oliver's A Young Man Seated Under a Tree; 1590–1595.

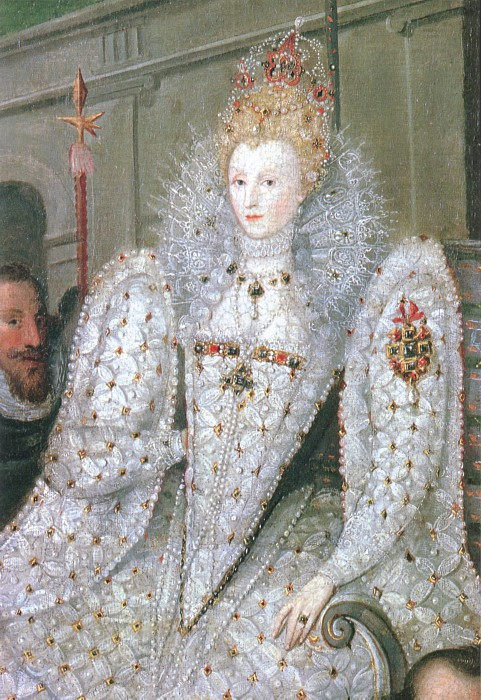
Detail of Robert Peake the Elder's procession portrait of Elizabeth I; c. 1601.

The Chandos portrait of Shakespeare, attributed to John Taylor; 1600–1610.

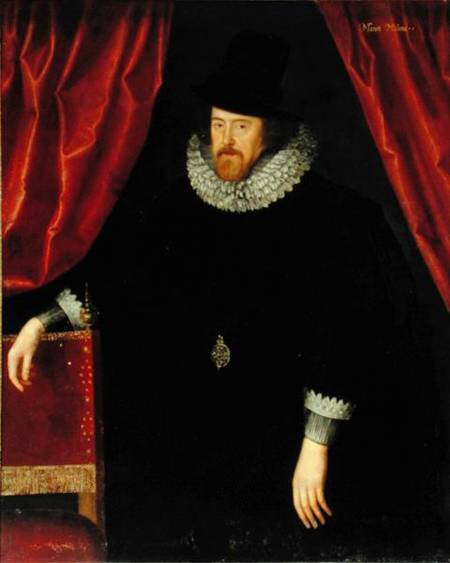
William Larkin's portrait of Sir Francis Bacon; c. 1610.

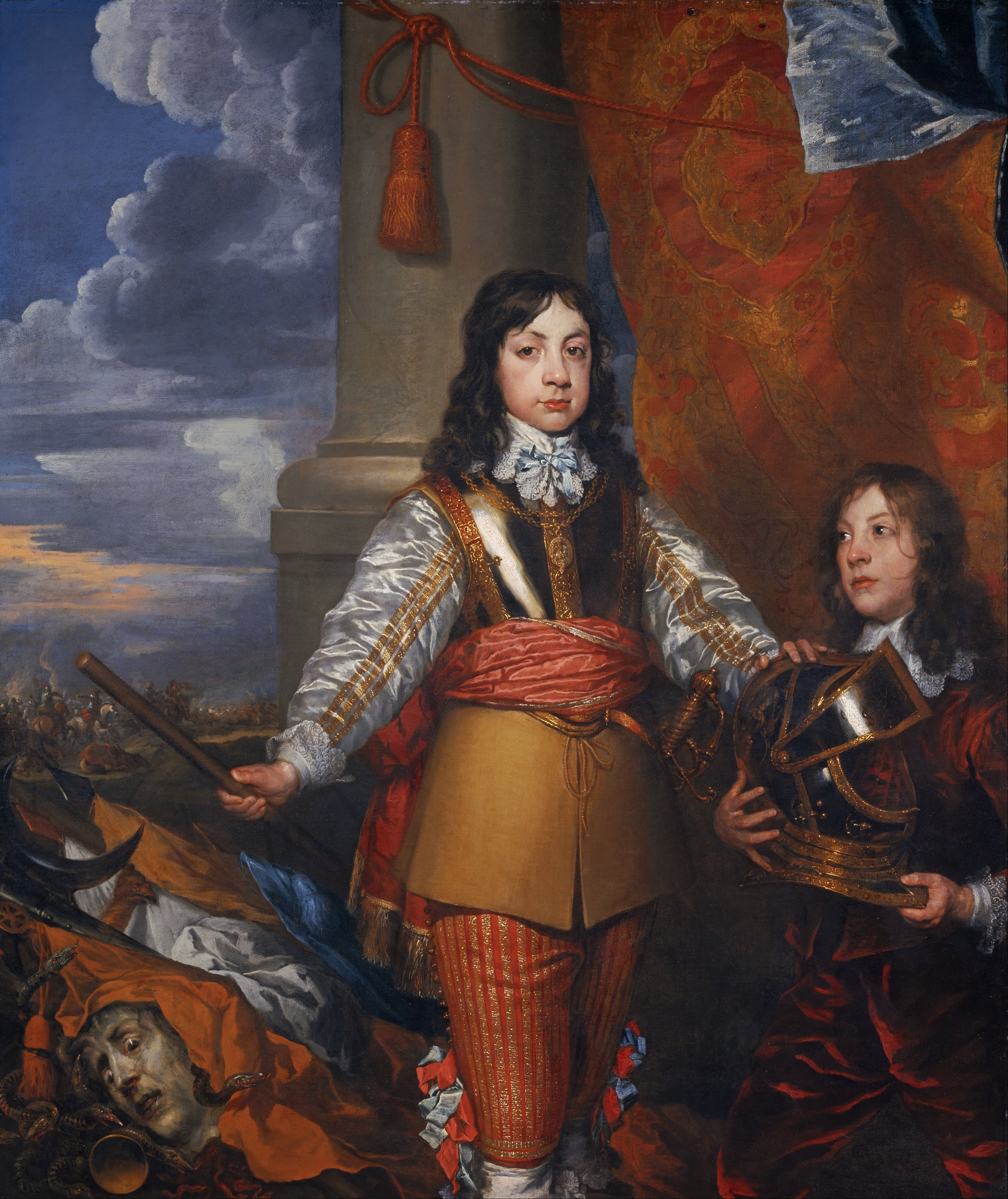
Dobson's portrait of Charles II when Prince of Wales; 1644.

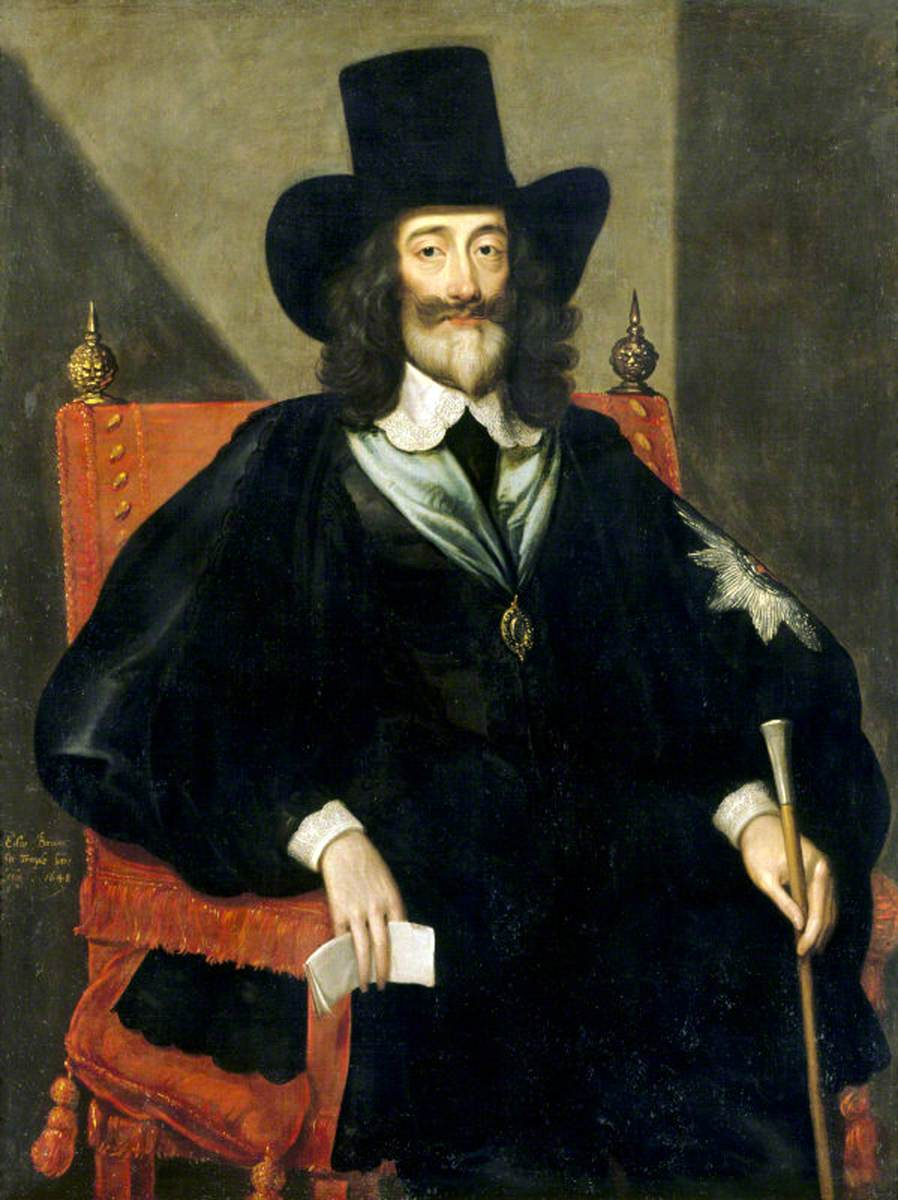
Edward Bower's King Charles I at his trial; 1648.

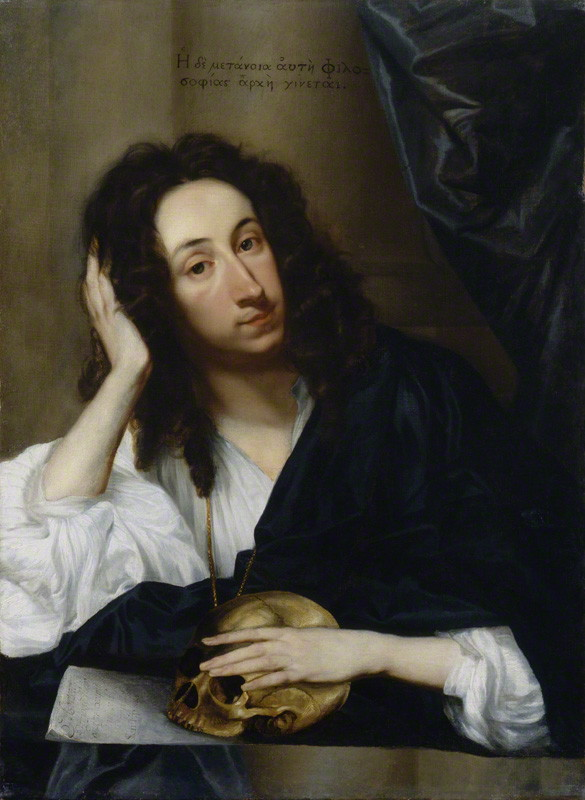
Robert Walker's portrait of diarist John Evelyn; 1648.

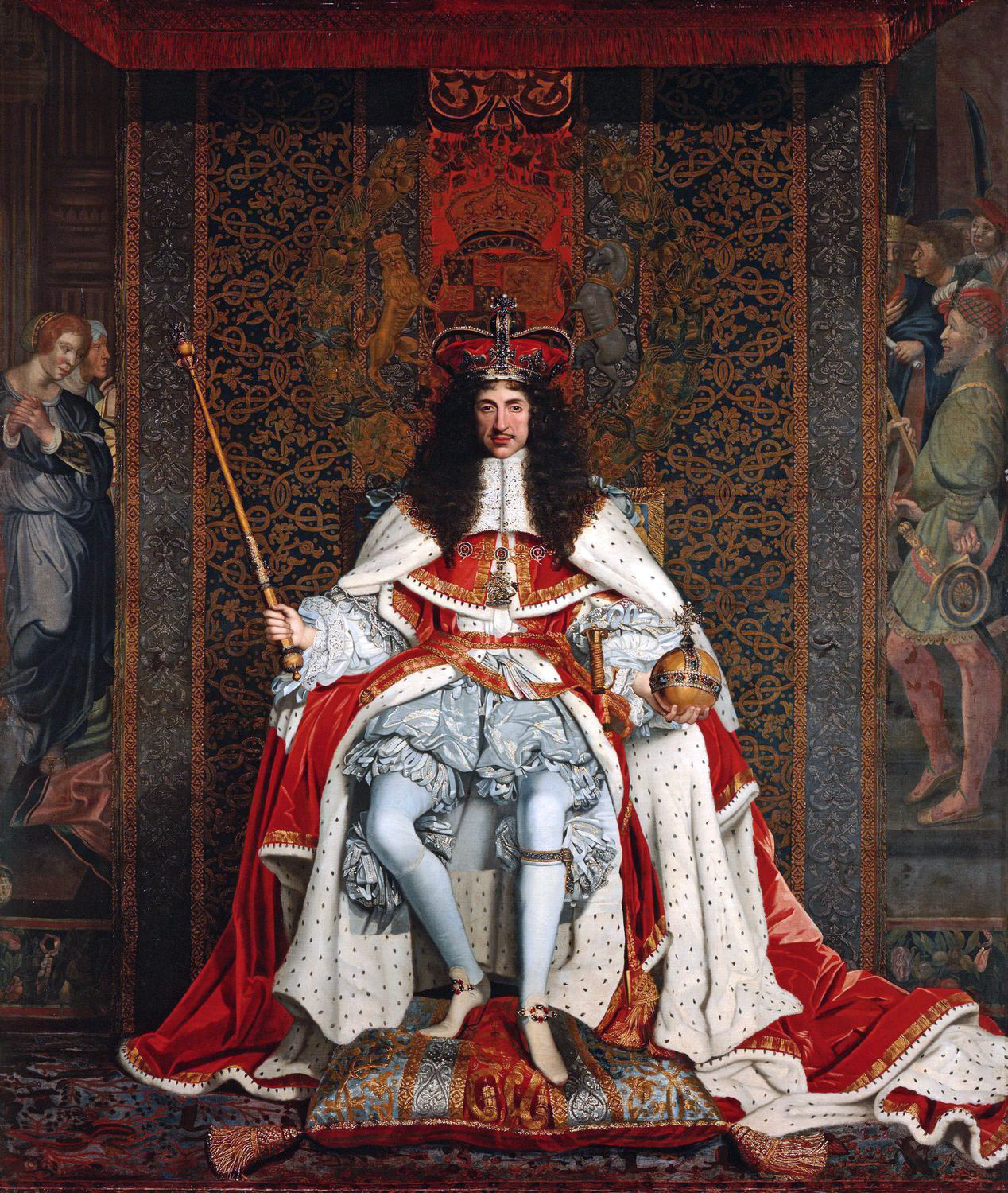
John Michael Wright's portrait of Charles II; c. 1676.

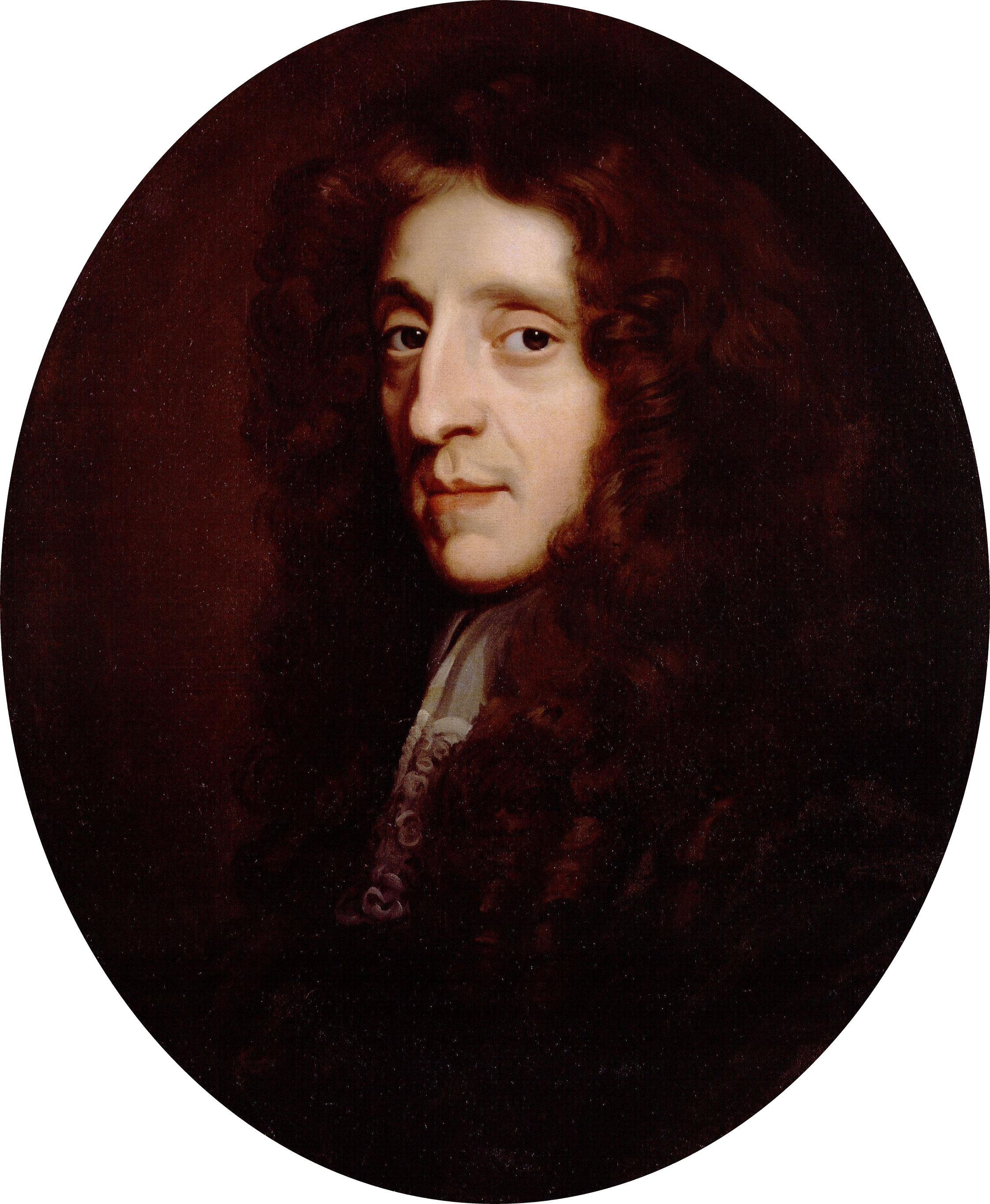
John Greenhill's portrait of John Locke; c. 1672–1676.

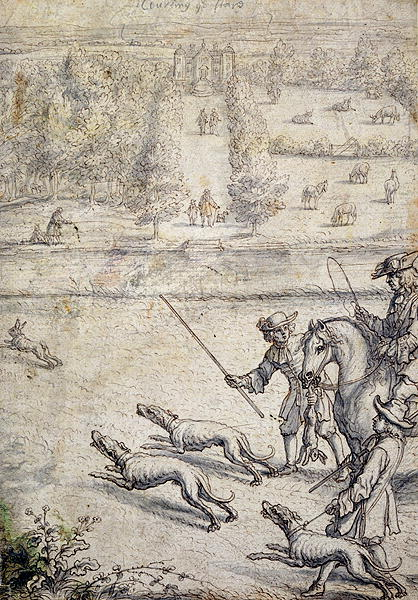
Francis Barlow's Coursing the Hare; 1686.

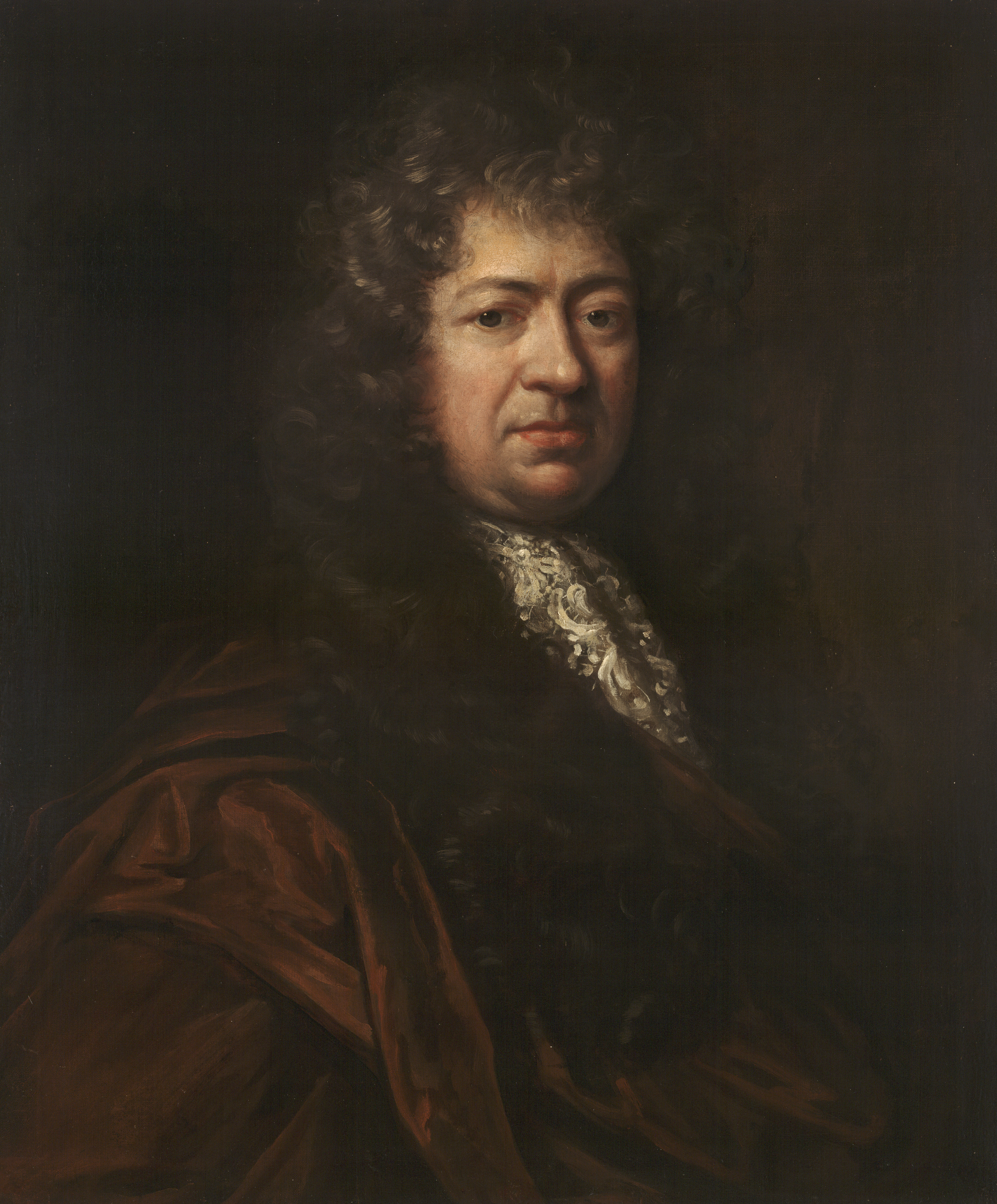
John Riley's portrait of Samuel Pepys; c. 1690.

== 18th and 19th centuries ==
In the 18th century, English painting's distinct style and tradition continued to concentrate frequently on portraiture, but interest in landscapes increased, and a new focus was placed on history painting, which was regarded as the highest of the hierarchy of genres, and is exemplified in the extraordinary work of Sir James Thornhill (1675/1676–1734). History painter Robert Streater (1621–1679) was highly thought of in his time.

William Hogarth (1697–1764) reflected the burgeoning English middle-class temperament — English in habits, disposition, and temperament, as well as by birth. His satirical works, full of black humour, point out to contemporary society the deformities, weaknesses and vices of London life. Hogarth's influence can be found in the distinctively English satirical tradition continued by James Gillray (1756–1815), and George Cruikshank (1792–1878). One of the genres in which Hogarth worked was the conversation piece, a form in which certain of his contemporaries also excelled: Joseph Highmore (1692–1780), Francis Hayman (1708–1776), and Arthur Devis (1712–1787).

Portraits were in England, as in Europe, the easiest and most profitable way for an artist to make a living, and the English tradition continued to show the relaxed elegance of the portrait-style traceable to Van Dyck. The leading portraitists are: Thomas Gainsborough (1727–1788); Sir Joshua Reynolds (1723–1792), founder of the Royal Academy of Arts; George Romney (1734–1802); Lemuel "Francis" Abbott (1760/61–1802); Richard Westall (1765–1836); Sir Thomas Lawrence (1769–1830); and Thomas Phillips (1770–1845). Also of note are Jonathan Richardson (1667–1745) and his pupil (and defiant son-in-law) Thomas Hudson (1701–1779). Joseph Wright of Derby (1734–1797) was well known for his candlelight pictures; George Stubbs (1724–1806) and, later, Edwin Henry Landseer (1802–1873) for their animal paintings. By the end of the century, the English swagger portrait was much admired abroad.

London's William Blake (1757–1827) produced a diverse and visionary body of work defying straightforward classification; critic Jonathan Jones regards him as "far and away the greatest artist Britain has ever produced". Blake's artist friends included neoclassicist John Flaxman (1755–1826), and Thomas Stothard (1755–1834) with whom Blake quarrelled.

In the popular imagination English landscape painting from the 18th century onwards typifies English art, inspired largely from the love of the pastoral and mirroring as it does the development of larger country houses set in a pastoral rural landscape. Two English Romantics are largely responsible for raising the status of landscape painting worldwide: John Constable (1776–1837) and J. M. W. Turner (1775–1851), who is credited with elevating landscape painting to an eminence rivalling history painting. Other notable 18th and 19th century landscape painters include: George Arnald (1763–1841); John Linnell (1792–1882), a rival to Constable in his time; George Morland (1763–1804), who developed on Francis Barlow's tradition of animal and rustic painting; Samuel Palmer (1805–1881); Paul Sandby (1731–1809), who is recognised as the father of English watercolour painting; and subsequent watercolourists John Robert Cozens (1752–1797), Turner's friend Thomas Girtin (1775–1802), and Thomas Heaphy (1775–1835).

The early 19th century saw the emergence of the Norwich school of painters, the first provincial art movement outside of London. Short-lived owing to sparse patronage and internal dissent, its prominent members were "founding father" John Crome (1768–1821), John Sell Cotman (1782–1842), James Stark (1794–1859), and Joseph Stannard (1797–1830).

The Pre-Raphaelite Brotherhood movement, established in the 1840s, dominated English art in the second half of the 19th century. Its members — William Holman Hunt (1827–1910), Dante Gabriel Rossetti (1828–1882), John Everett Millais (1828–1896) and others — concentrated on religious, literary, and genre works executed in a colorful and minutely detailed, almost photographic style. Ford Madox Brown (1821–1893) shared the Pre-Raphaelites' principles.

Leading English art critic John Ruskin (1819–1900) was hugely influential in the latter half of the 19th century; from the 1850s he championed the Pre-Raphaelites, who were influenced by his ideas. William Morris (1834–1896), founder of the Arts and Crafts Movement, emphasised the value of traditional craft skills which seemed to be in decline in the mass industrial age. His designs, like the work of the Pre-Raphaelite painters with whom he was associated, referred frequently to medieval motifs. English narrative painter William Powell Frith (1819–1909) has been described as the "greatest British painter of the social scene since Hogarth", and painter and sculptor George Frederic Watts (1817–1904) became famous for his symbolist work.

The gallant spirit of 19th century English military art helped shape Victorian England's self-image. Notable English military artists include: John Edward Chapman 'Chester' Mathews (1843–1927); Lady Butler (1846–1933); Frank Dadd (1851–1929); Edward Matthew Hale (1852–1924); Charles Edwin Fripp (1854–1906); Richard Caton Woodville, Jr. (1856–1927); Harry Payne (1858–1927); George Delville Rowlandson (1861–1930); and Edgar Alfred Holloway (1870–1941). Thomas Davidson (1842–1919), who specialised in historical naval scenes, incorporated remarkable reproductions of Nelson-related works by Arnald, Westall and Abbott in England's Pride and Glory (1894).

To the end of the 19th century, the art of Aubrey Beardsley (1872–1898) contributed to the development of Art Nouveau, and suggested, among other things, an interest in the visual art of Japan.

=== 18th and 19th centuries: gallery ===
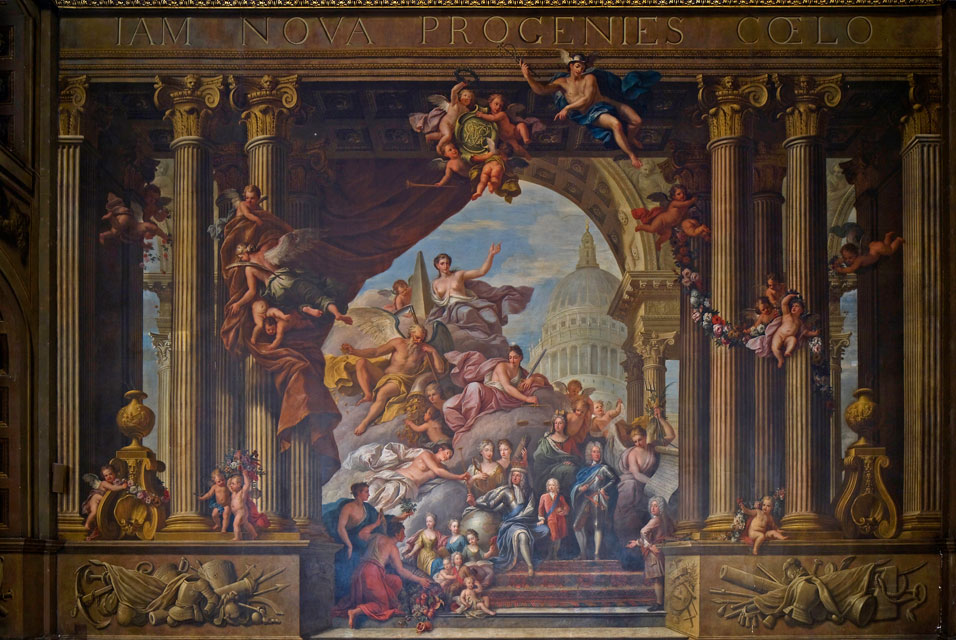
West wall of James Thornhill's Painted Hall at the Old Royal Naval College; 1707–1726.

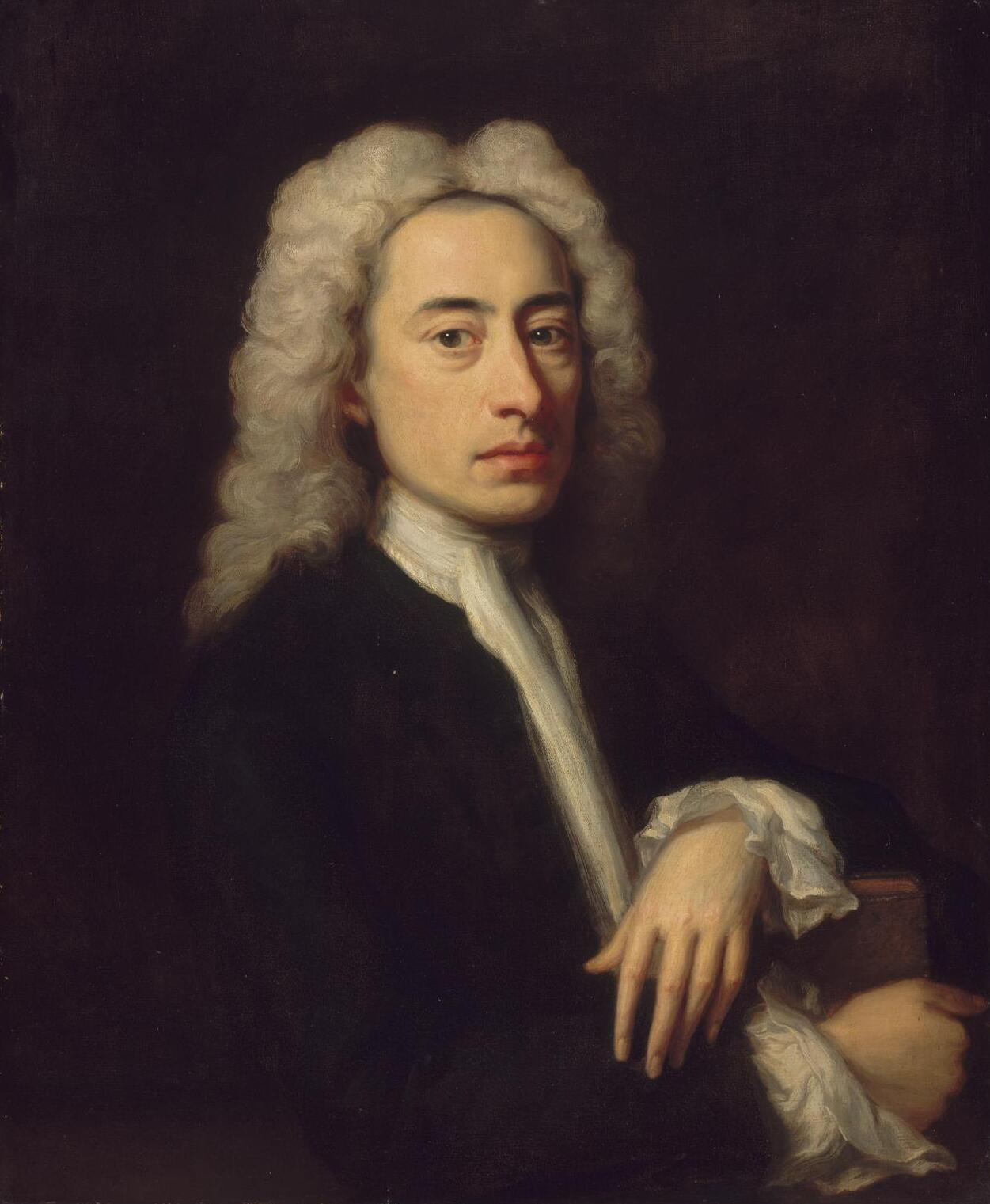
Richardson's portrait of Alexander Pope; c. 1736.

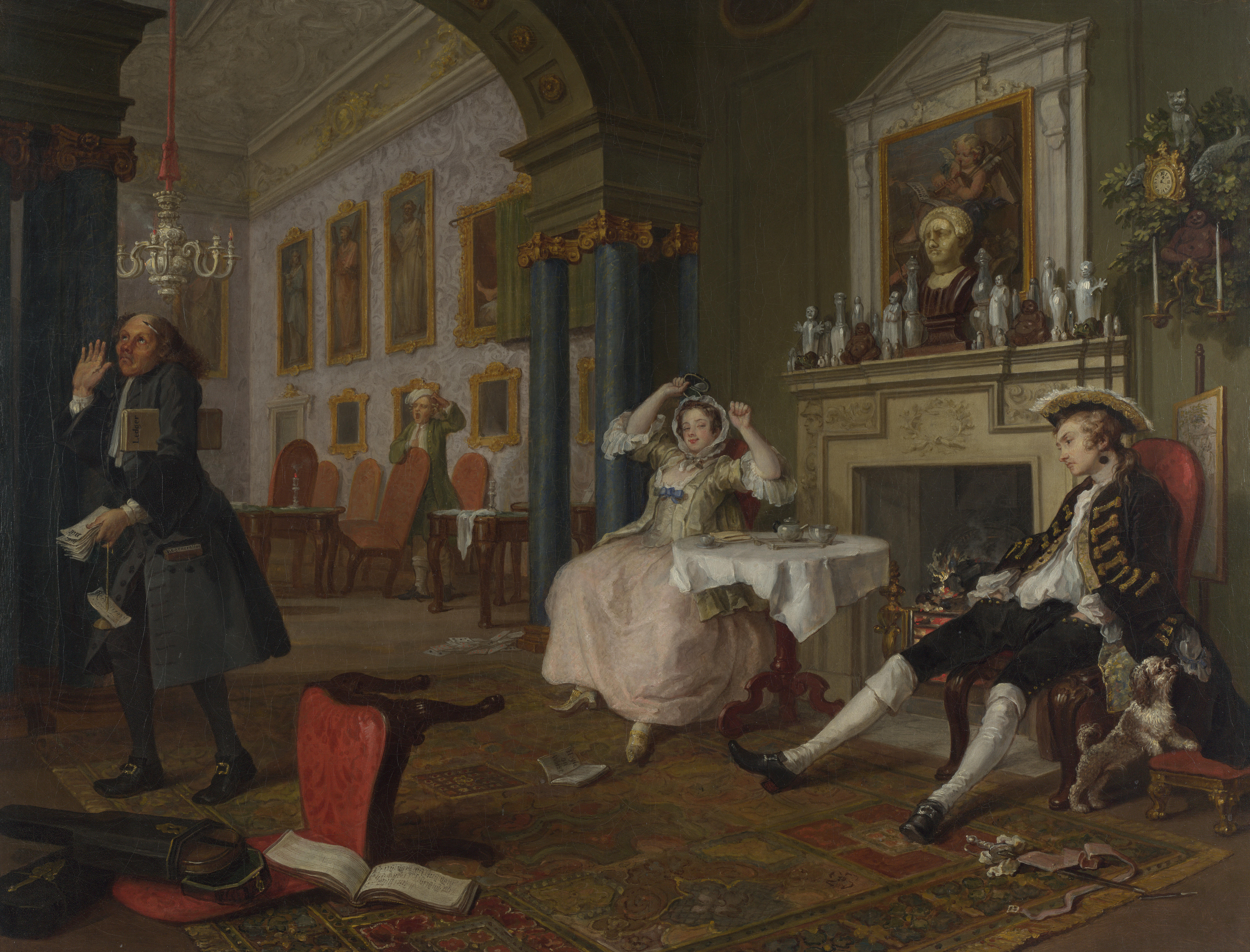
Hogarth's Marriage A-la-Mode: 2, The Tête à Tête; c. 1743.

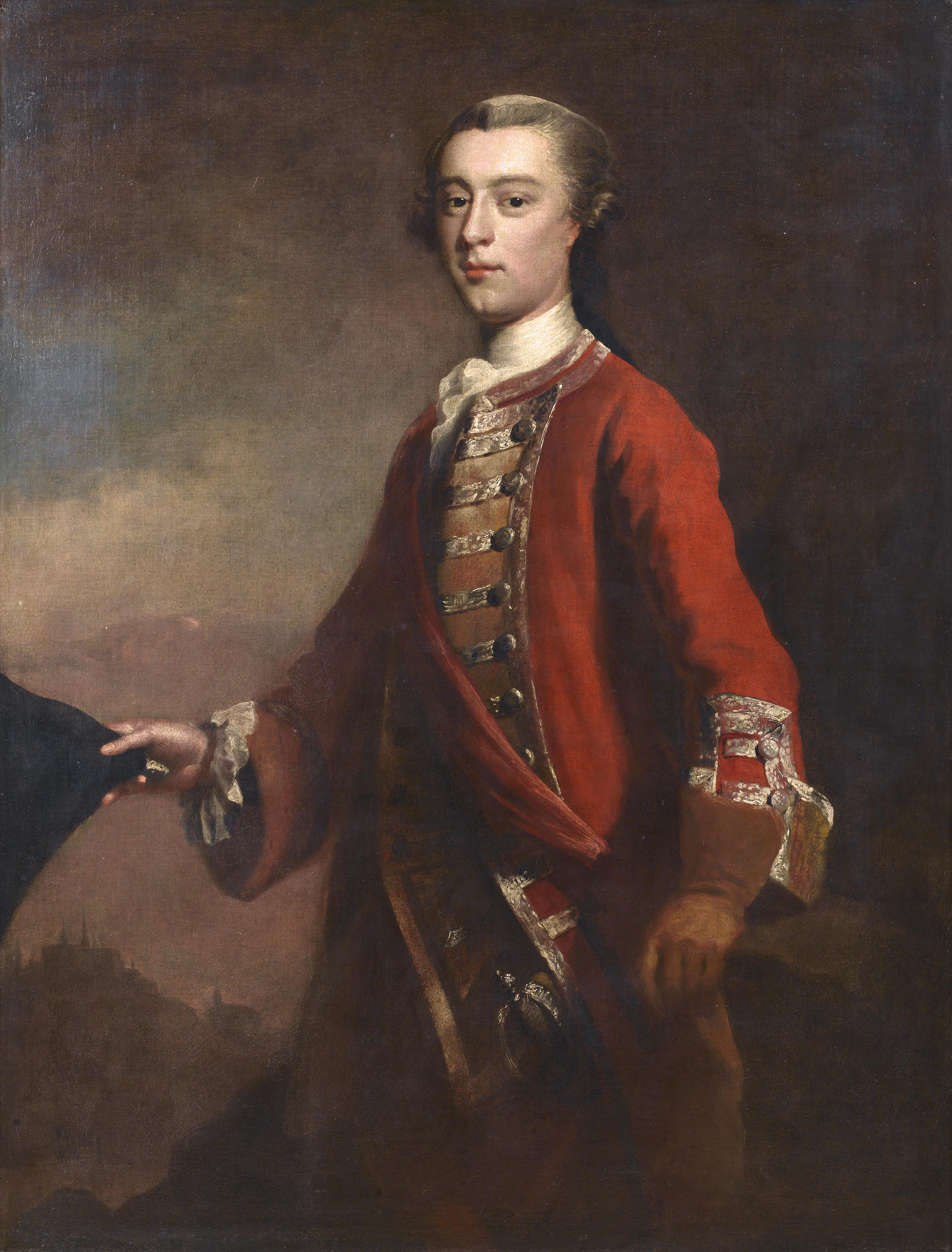
Highmore's portrait of General James Wolfe; 1749.

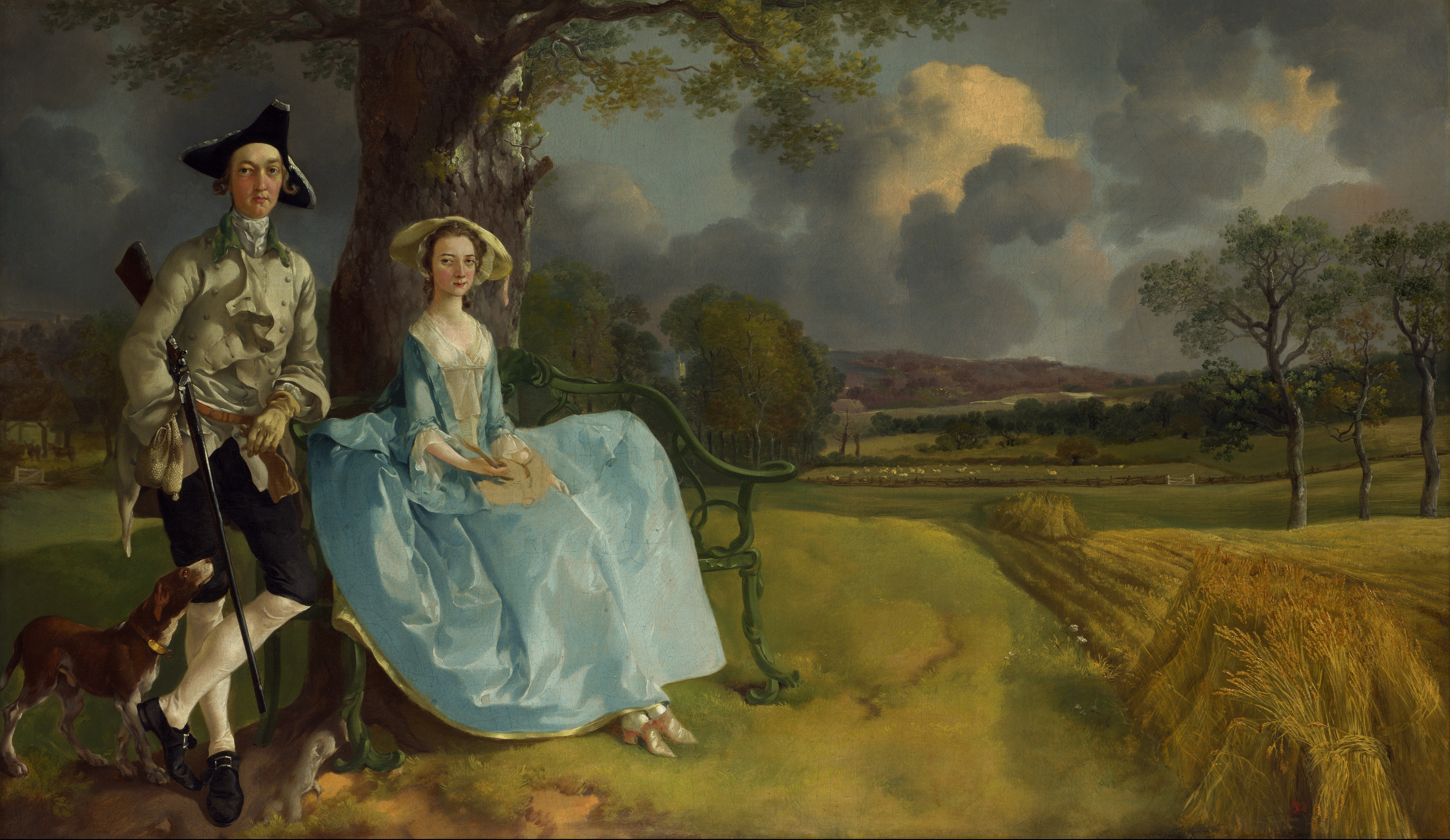
Gainsborough's Mr and Mrs Andrews; c. 1750.

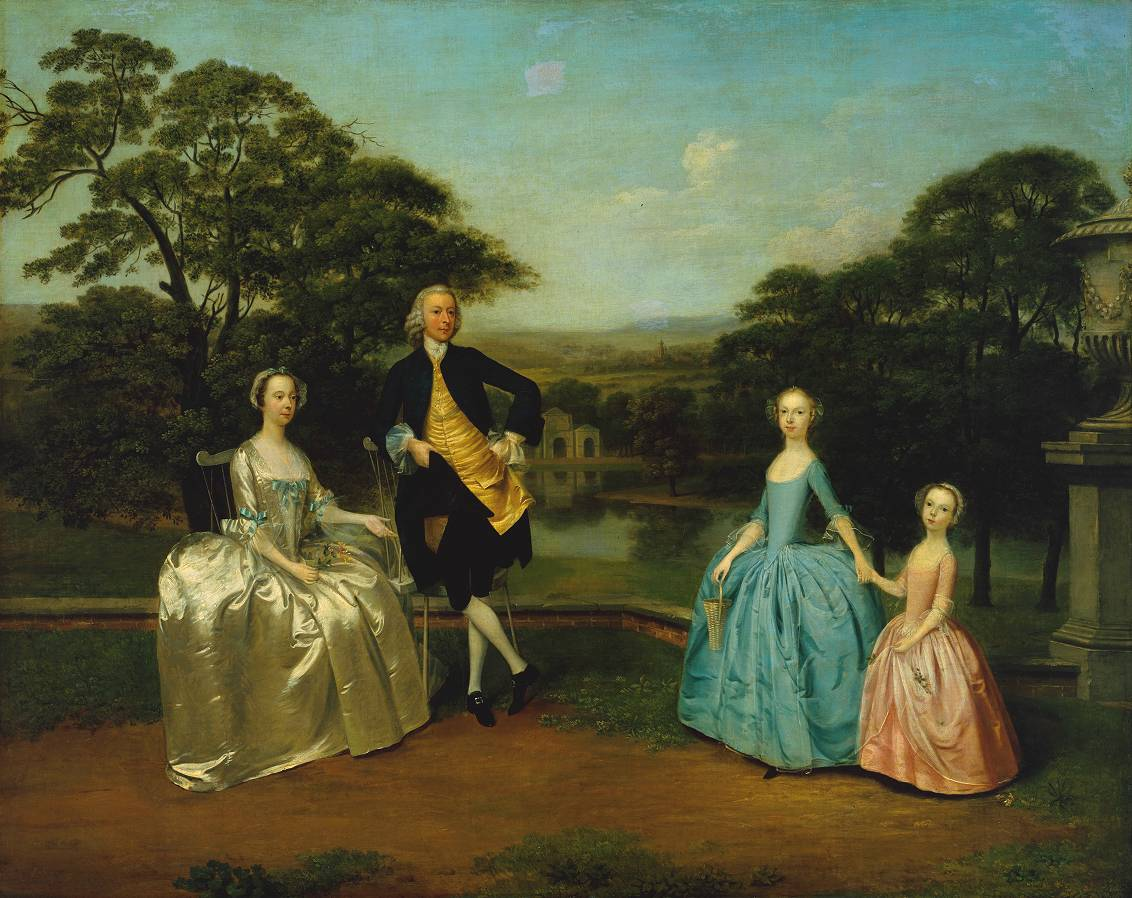
Arthur Devis's "conversation piece" portrait of the East India Company's Robert James and family; 1751.

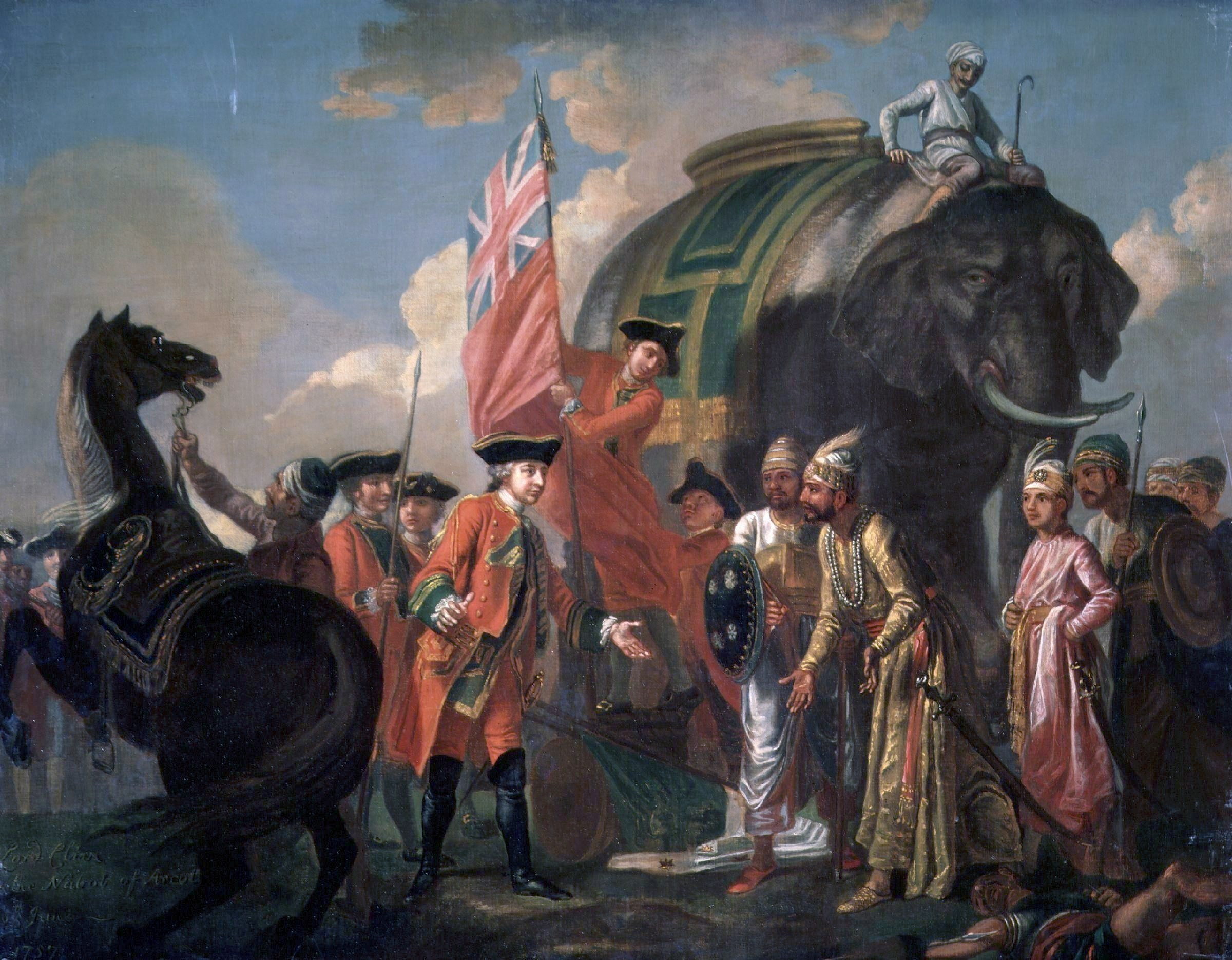
Francis Hayman's Robert Clive and Mir Jafar after the Battle of Plassey; 1757.

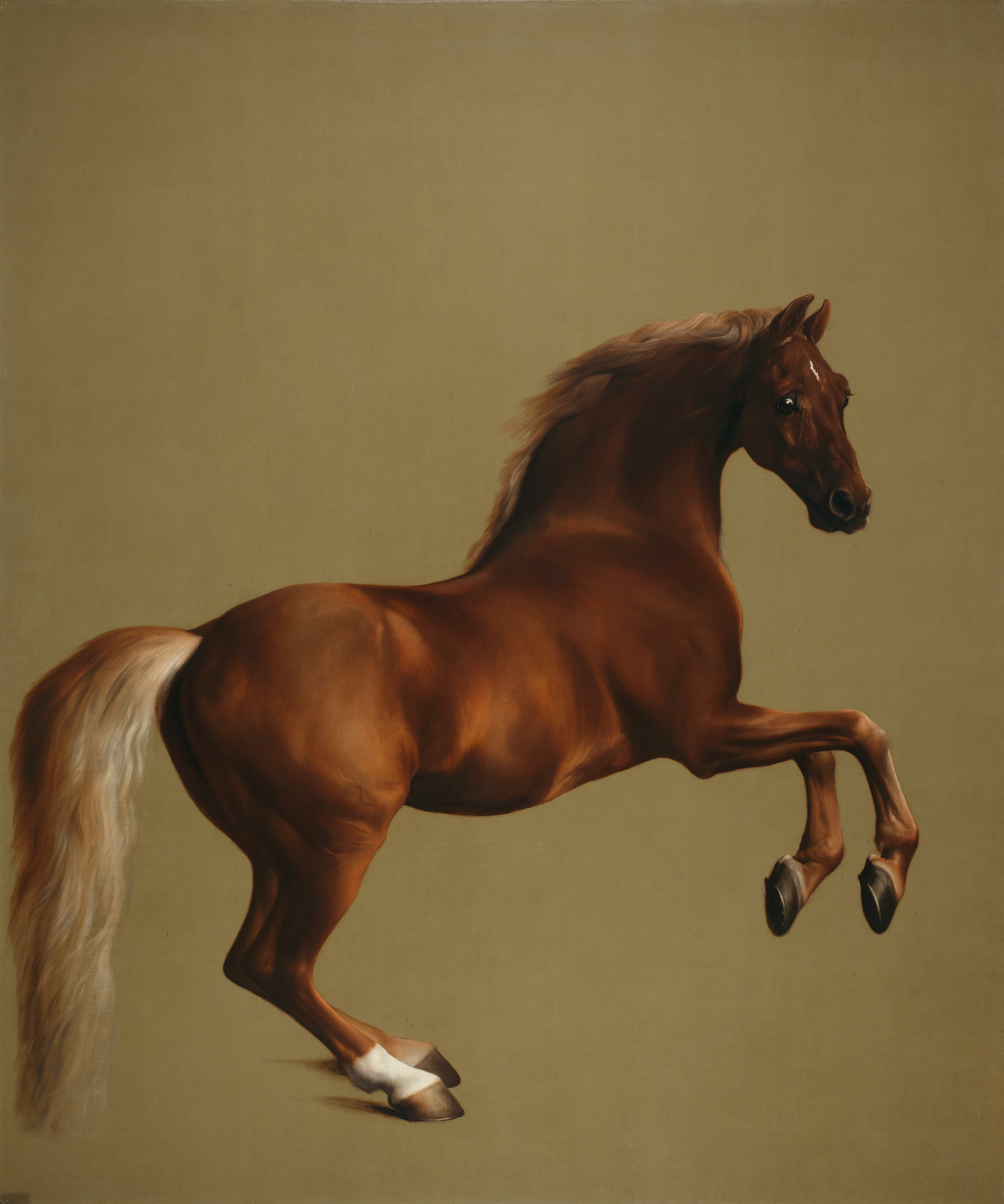
George Stubbs's Whistlejacket; c. 1762.

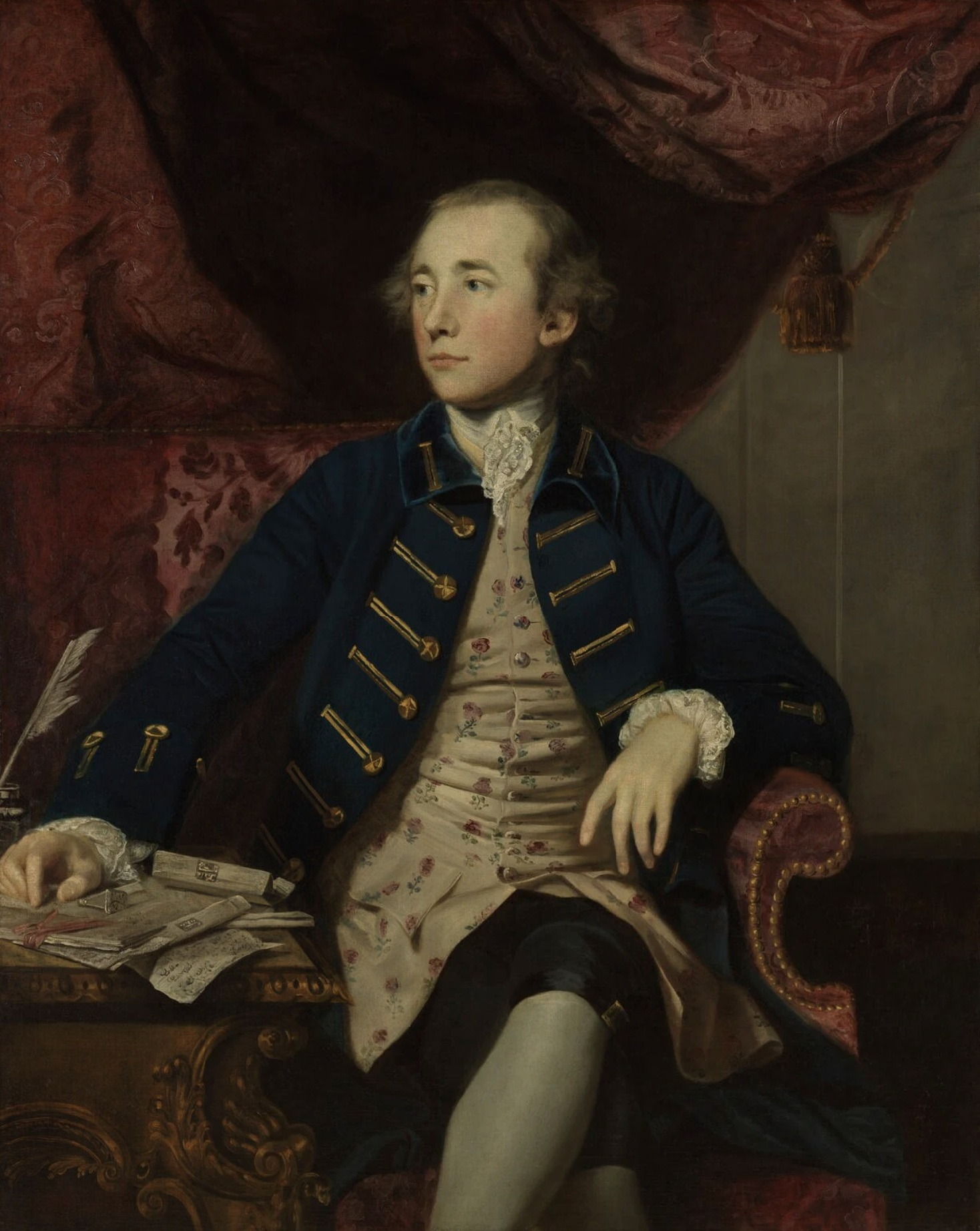
Sir Joshua Reynolds's portrait of Warren Hastings; 1766–1768.

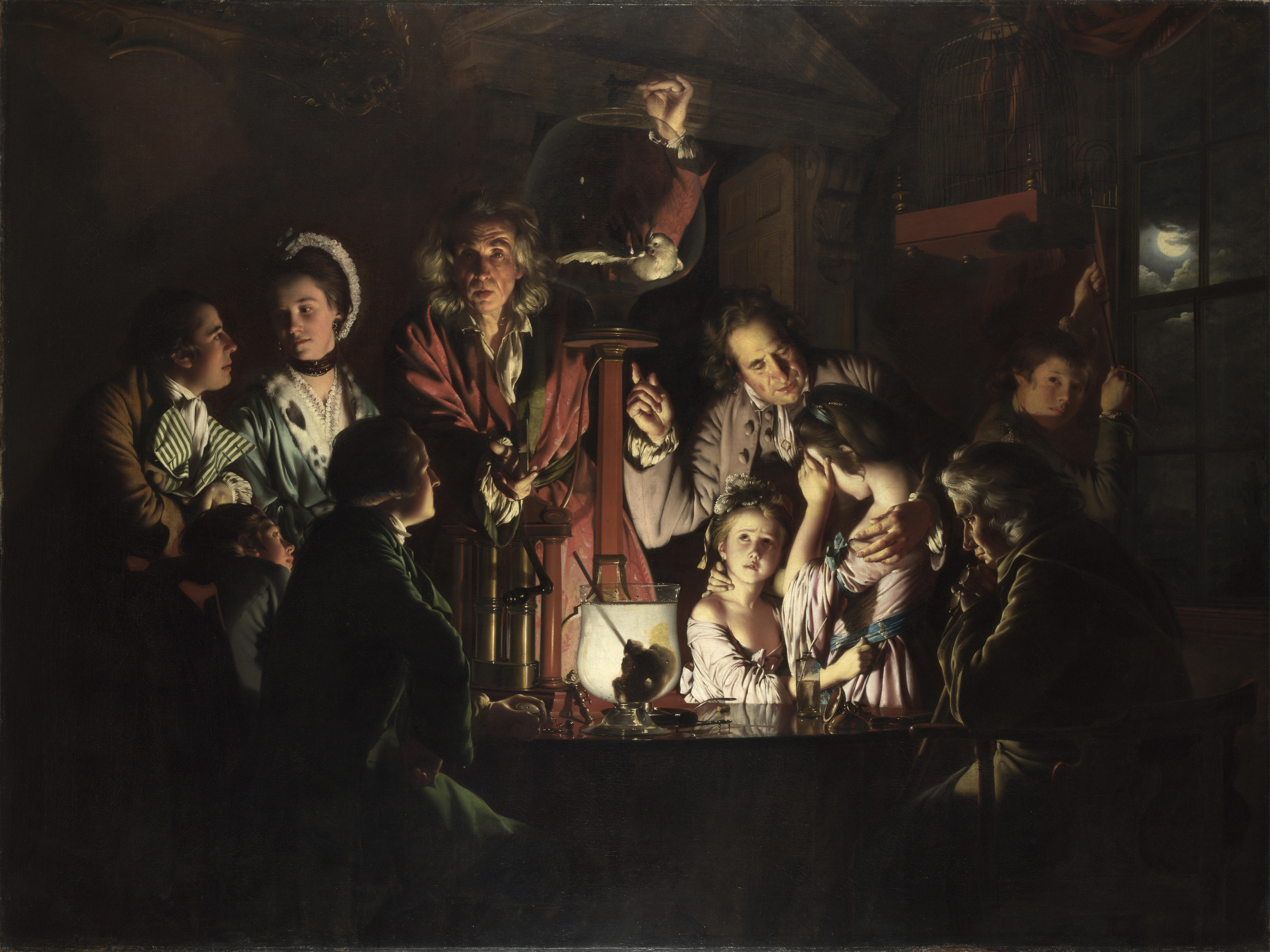
Joseph Wright of Derby's An Experiment on a Bird in the Air Pump; 1768.

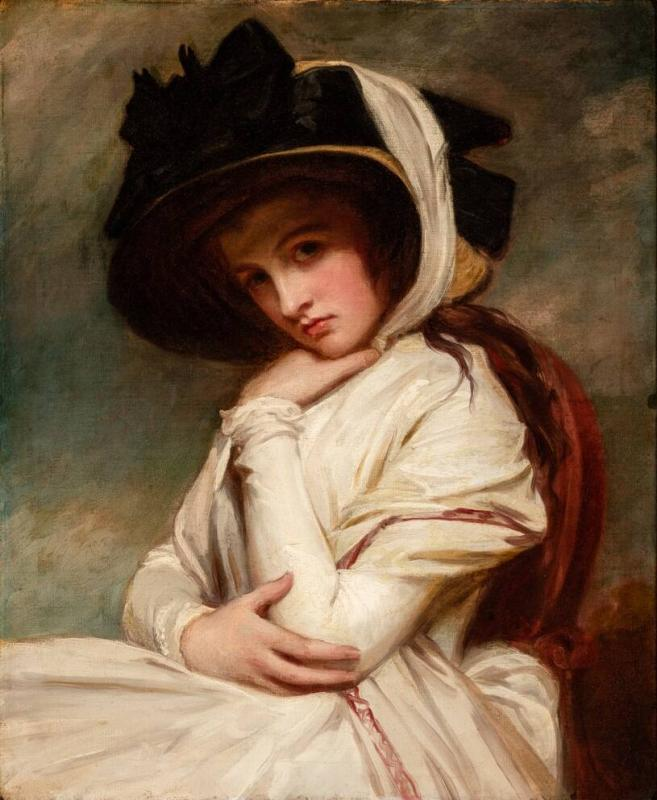
George Romney's Emma Hart in a Straw Hat; 1785.

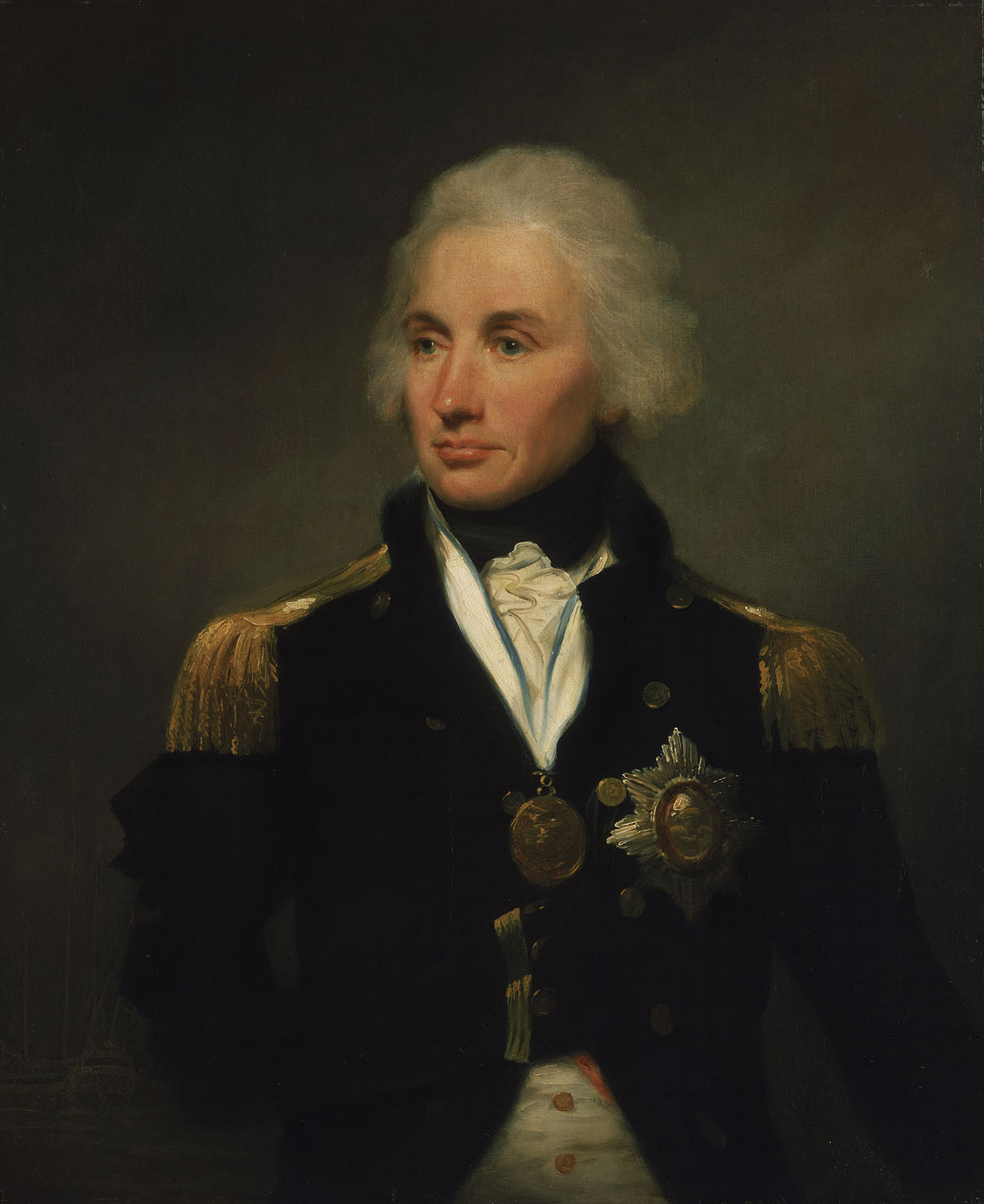
Lemuel Francis Abbott's portrait of Vice-Admiral Horatio Nelson; 1797.

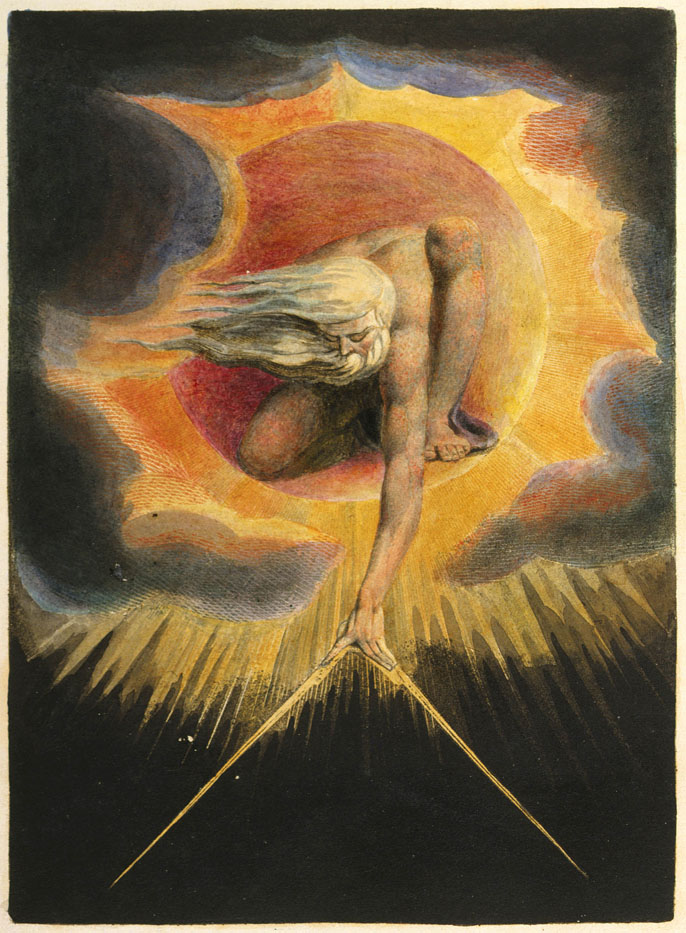
William Blake's The Ancient of Days, frontispiece to Europe a Prophecy; 1794.

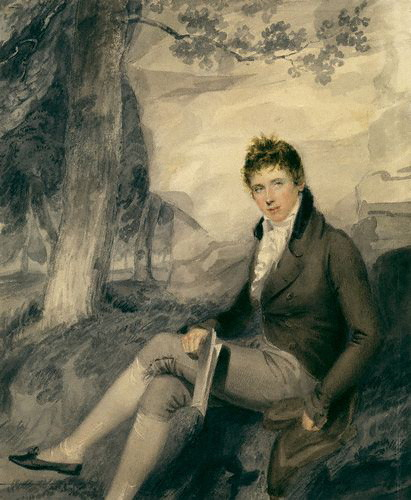
Thomas Heaphy's portrait of Palmerston; 1802.

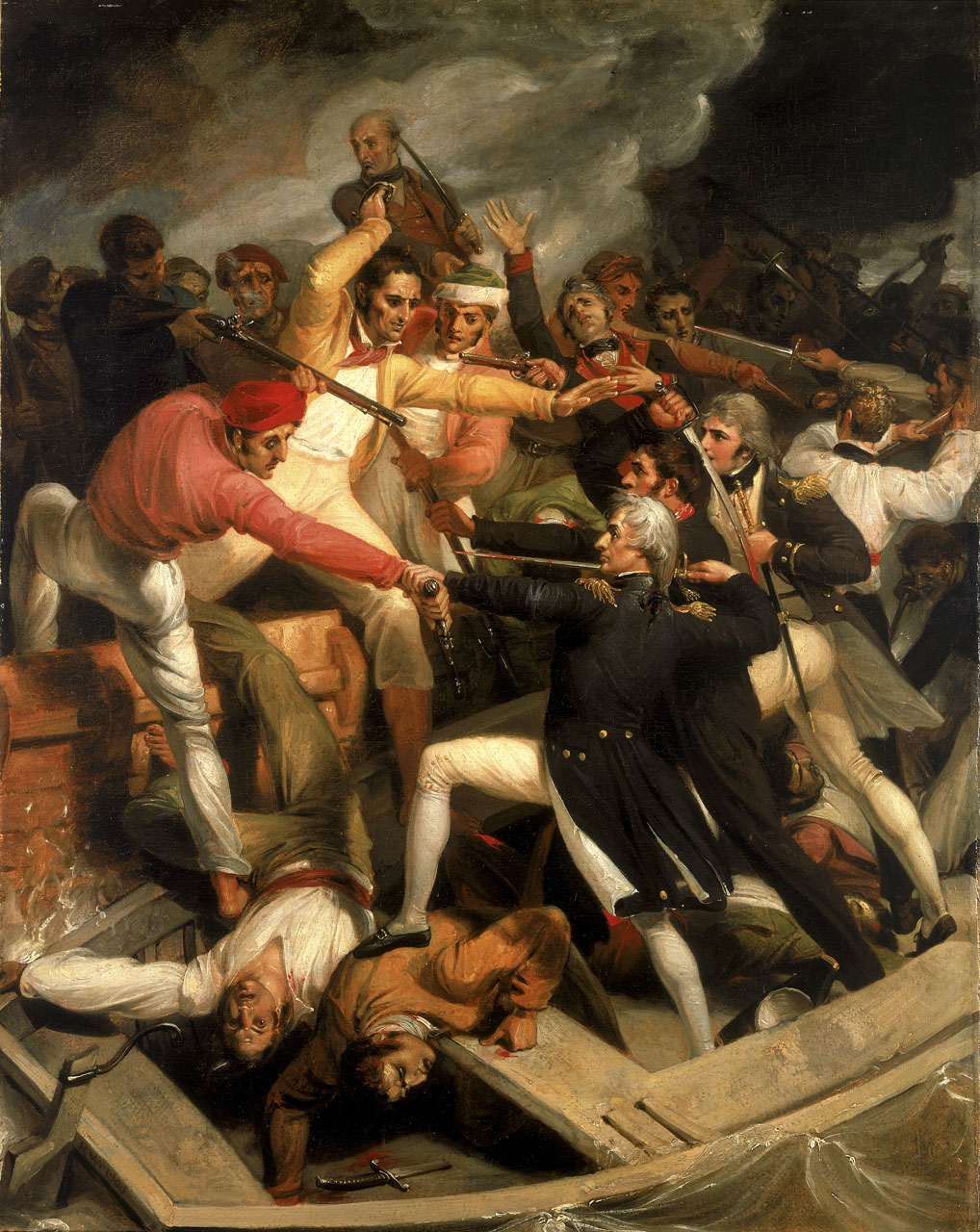
Richard Westall's Nelson in conflict with a Spanish launch, 3 July 1797; 1806.

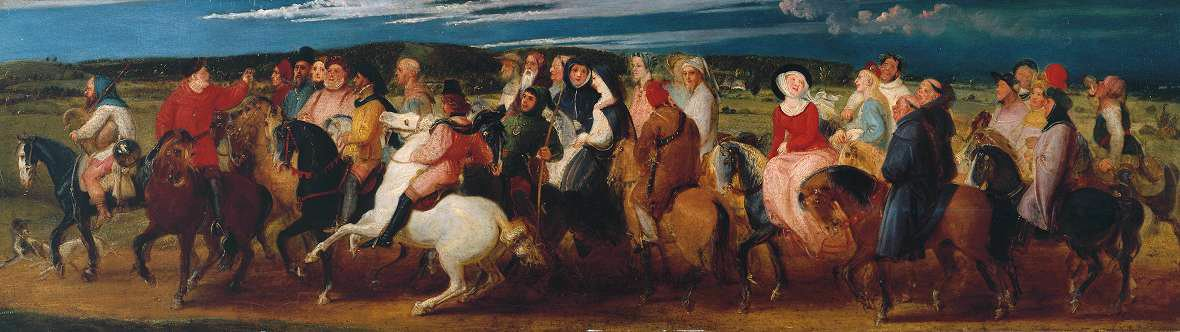
Thomas Stothard's Procession of the Canterbury Pilgrims; 1806–7.

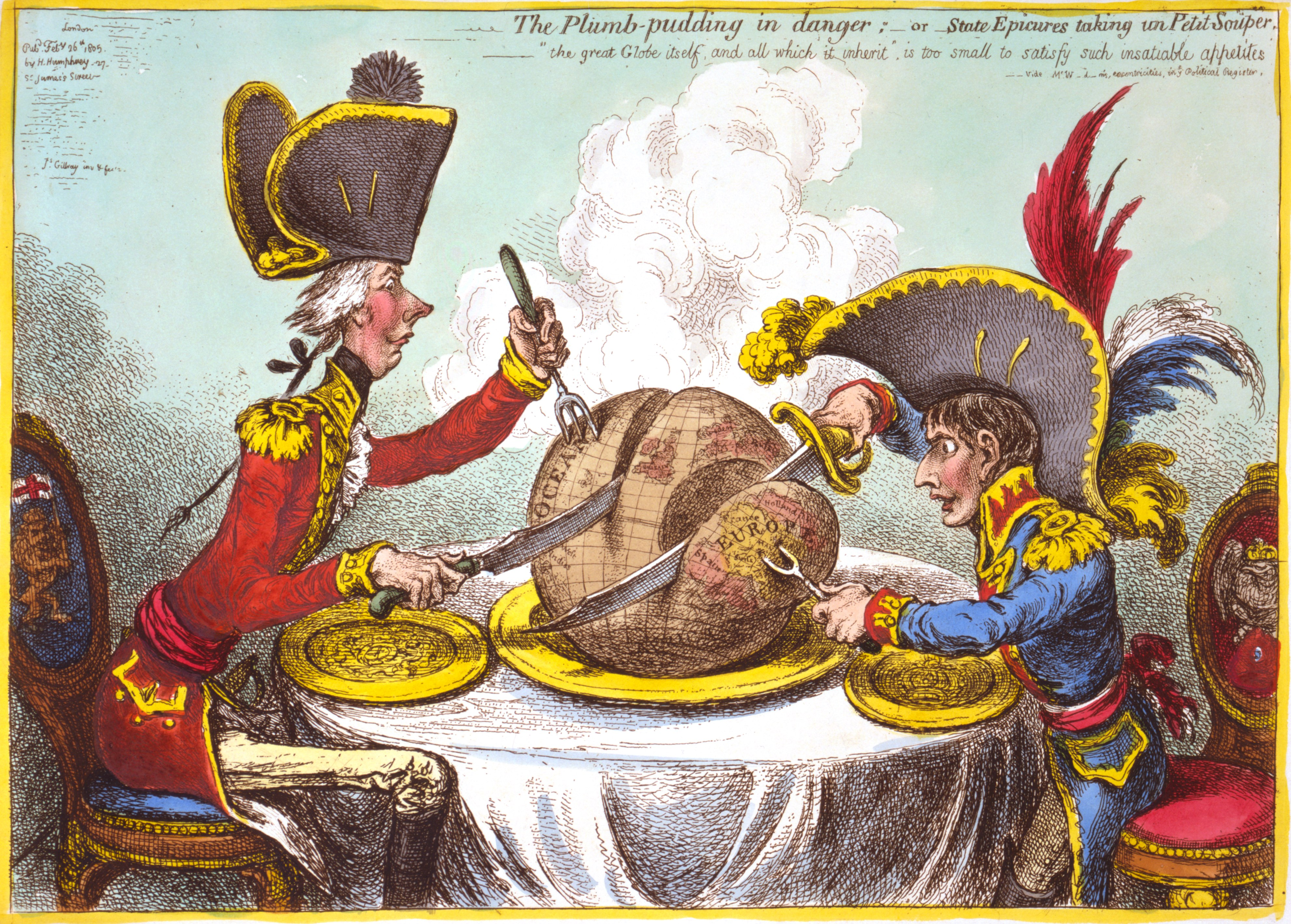
Gillray's The Plumb-pudding in danger; 1805.

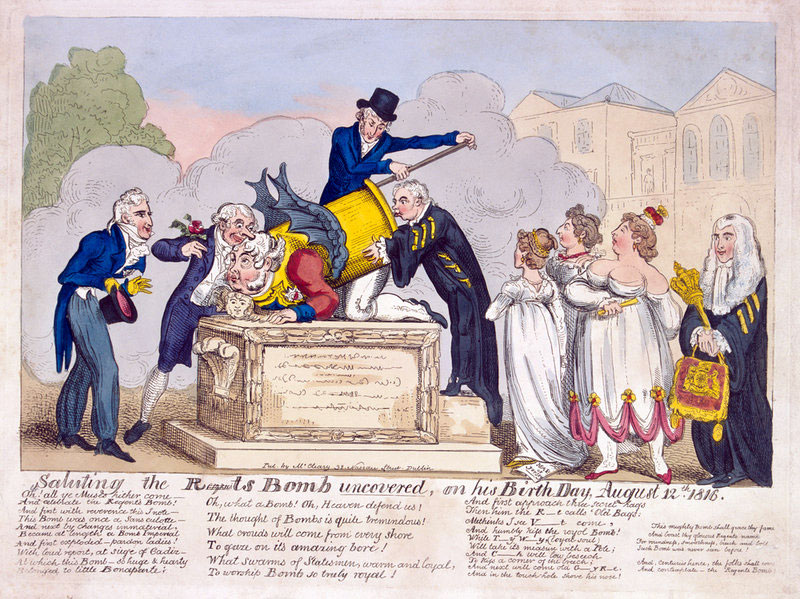
Cruikshank's Saluting the Regent's Bomb; 1816.

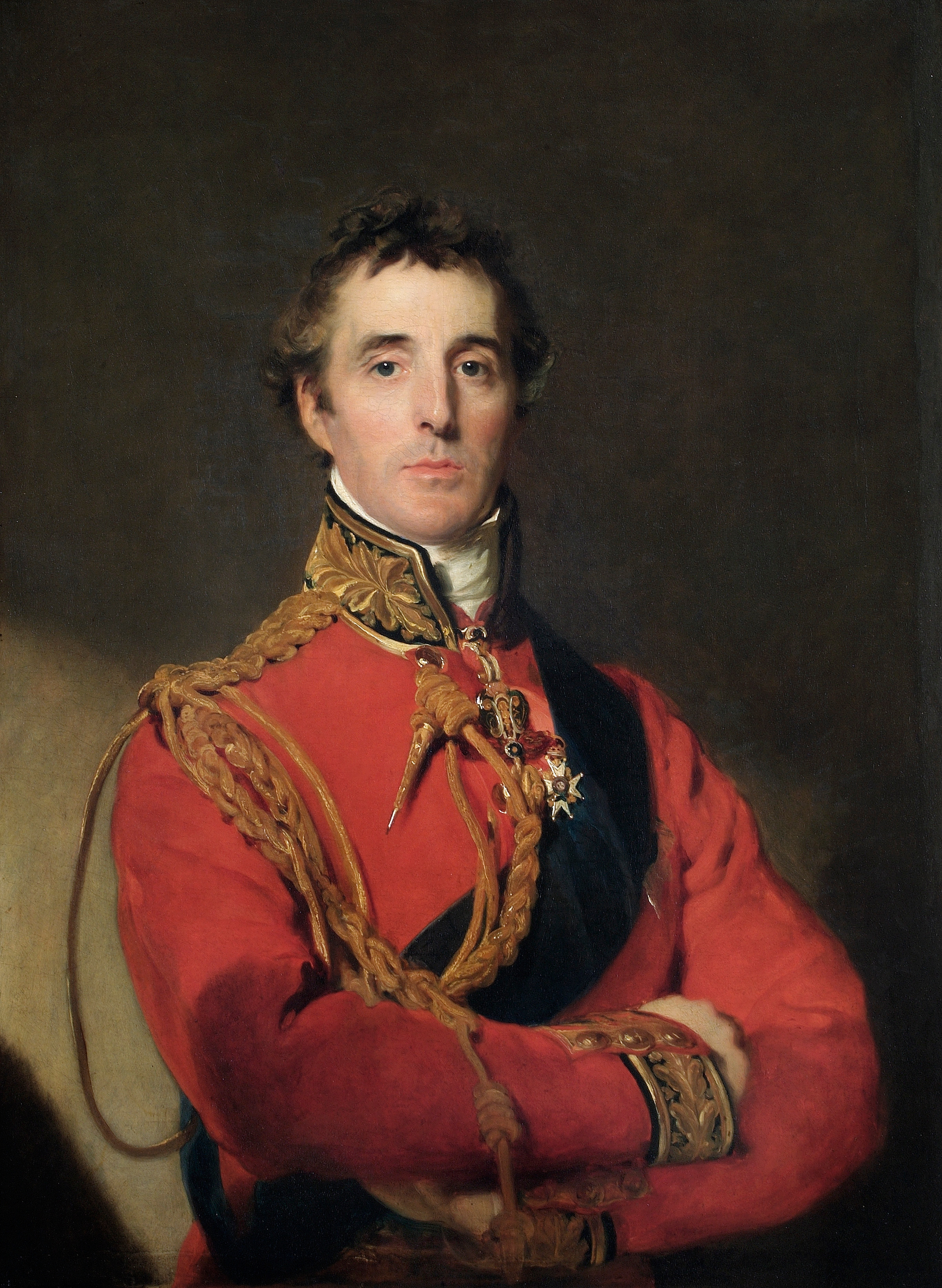
Lawrence's post-Waterloo Portrait of the Duke of Wellington; 1816.

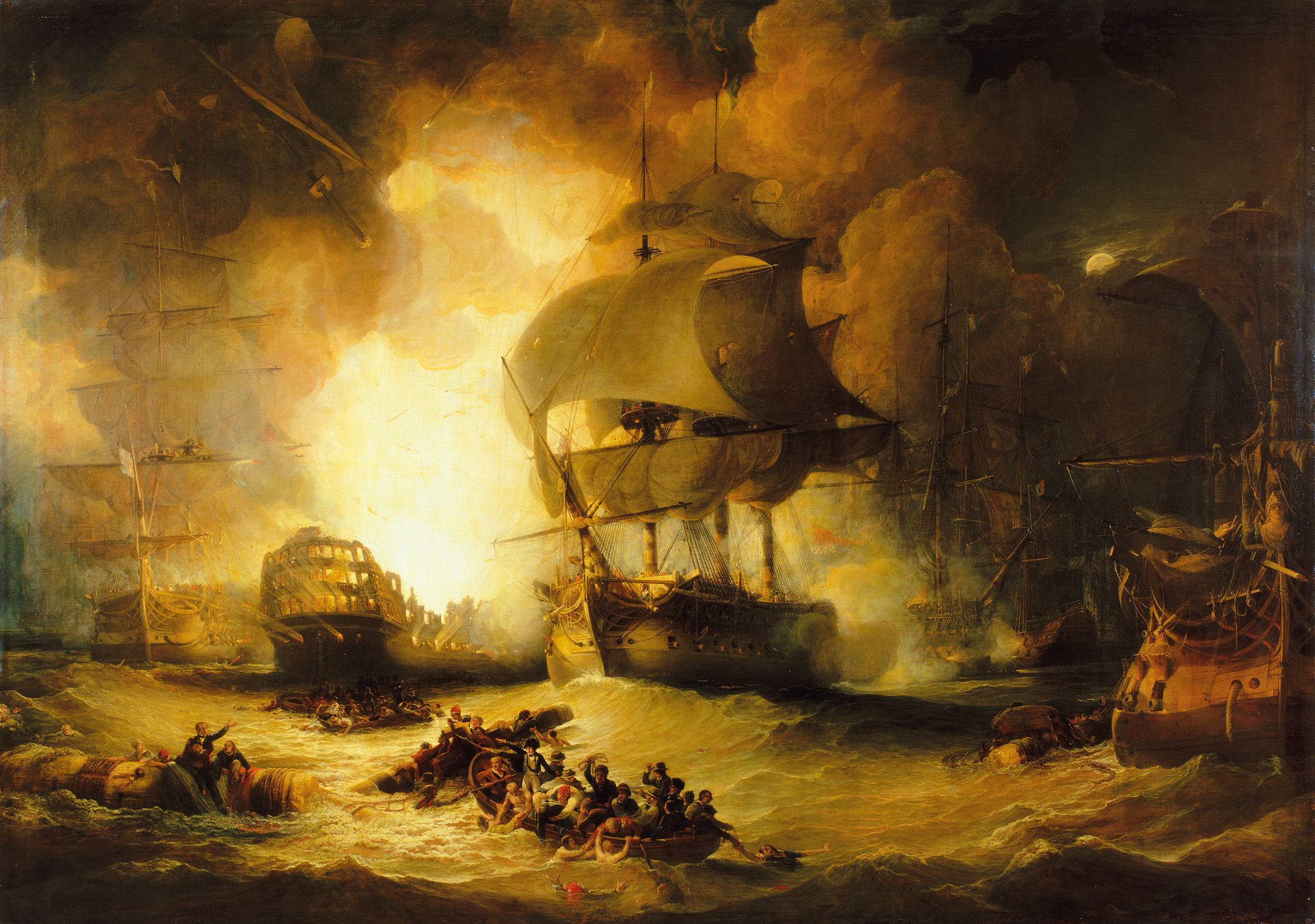
George Arnald's The Destruction of 'L'Orient' at the Battle of the Nile, 1 August 1798; 1825–27.

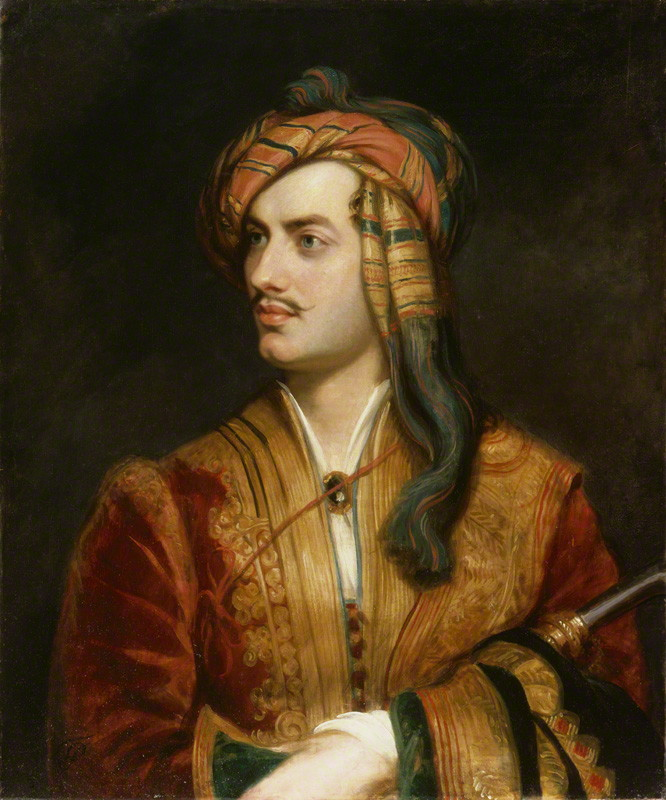
Phillips's Lord Byron in Albanian Dress; c. 1835.

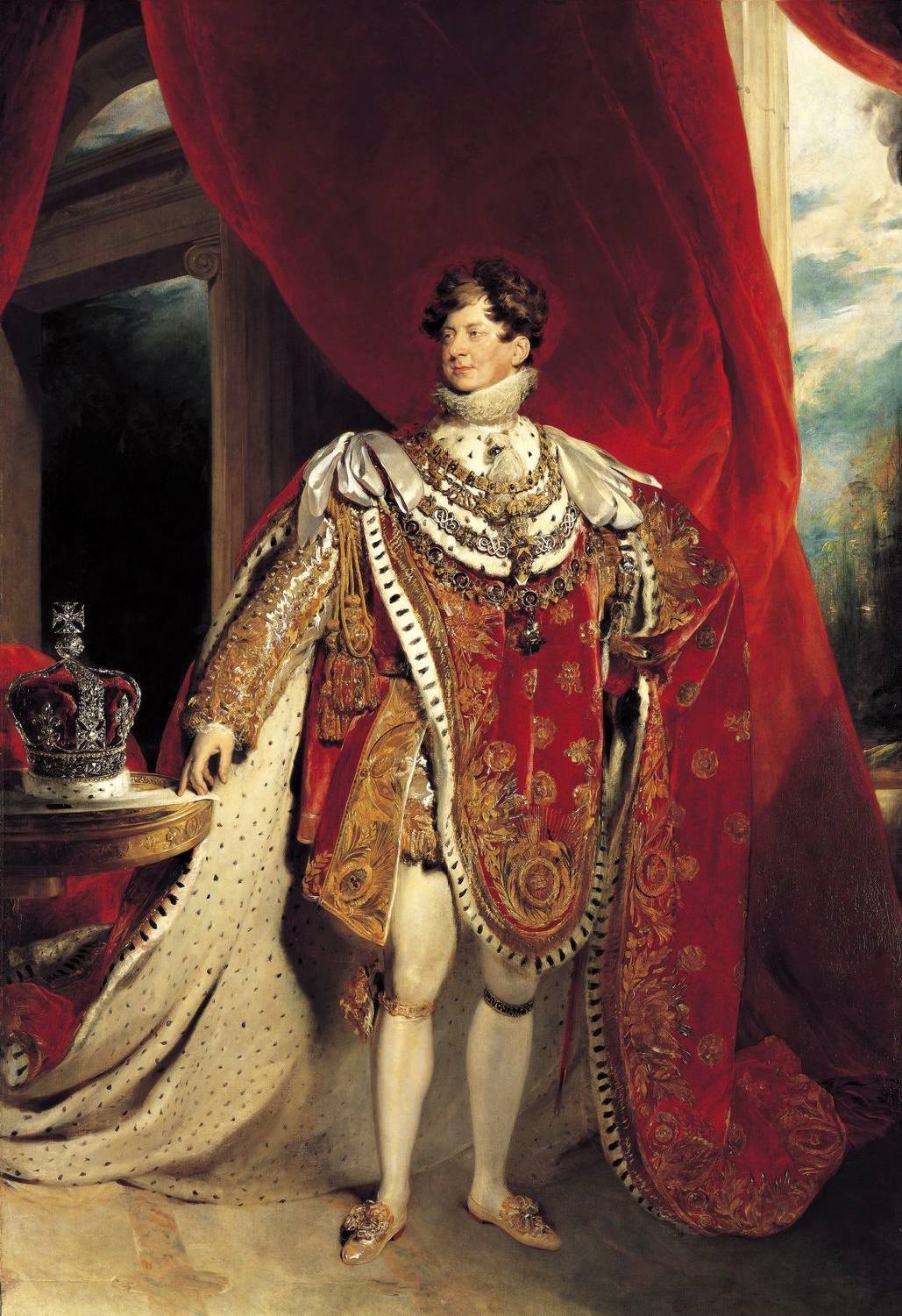
King George IV depicted wearing coronation robes and four collars of chivalric orders: the Golden Fleece, Royal Guelphic, Bath and Garter by Thomas Lawrence; c. 1821

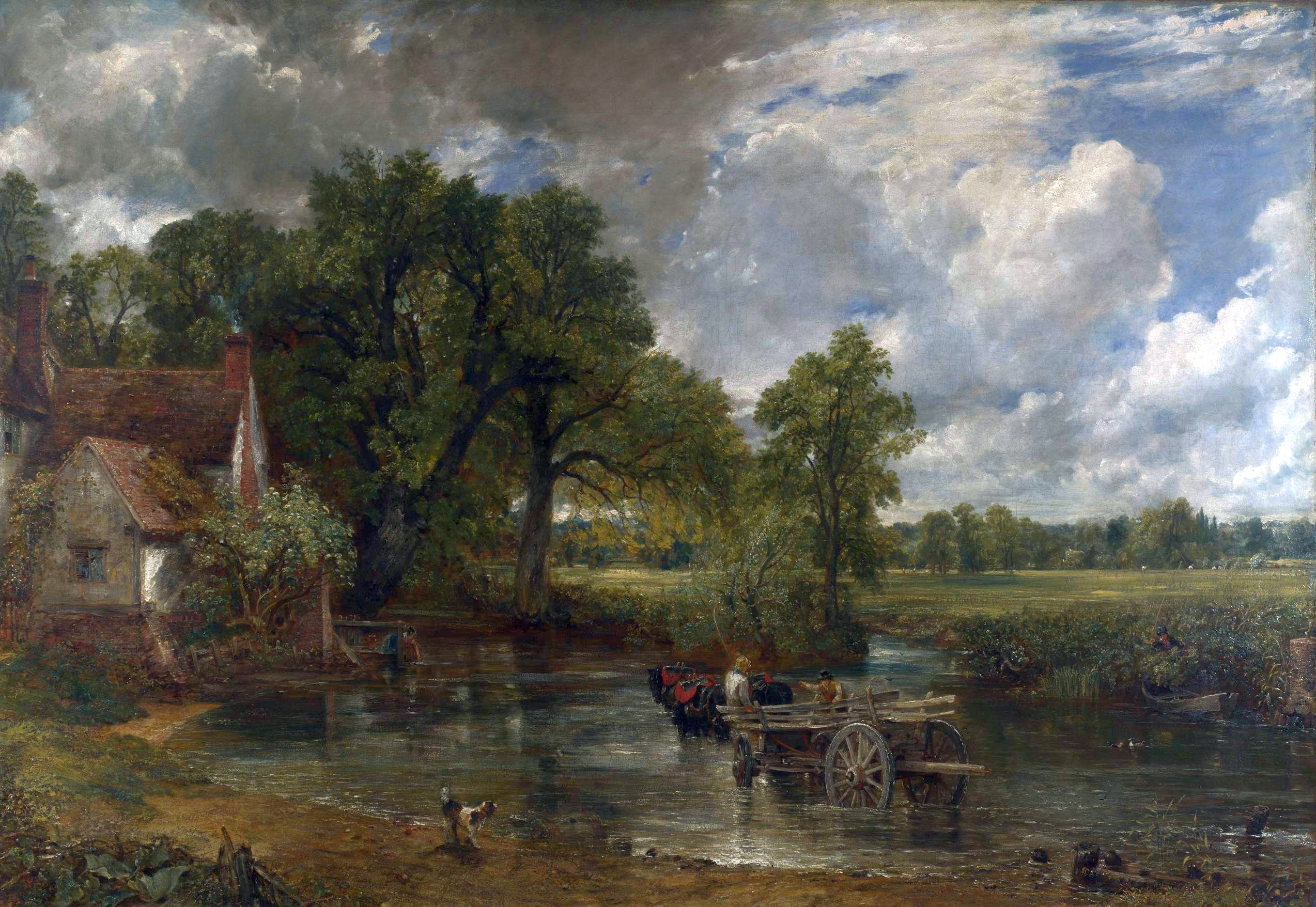
John Constable's The Hay Wain; c. 1821

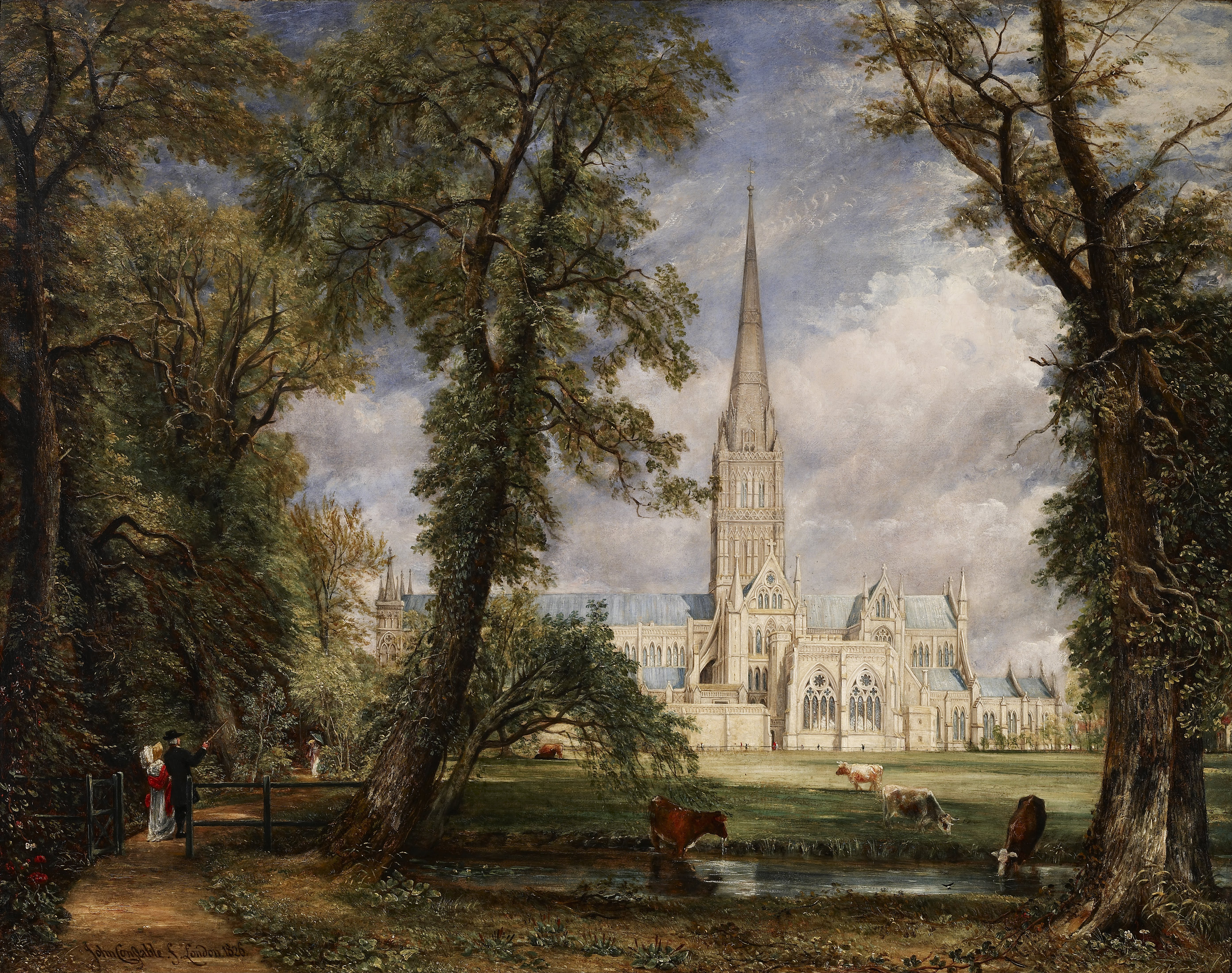
Constable's Salisbury Cathedral from the Bishop's Grounds; c. 1826 version

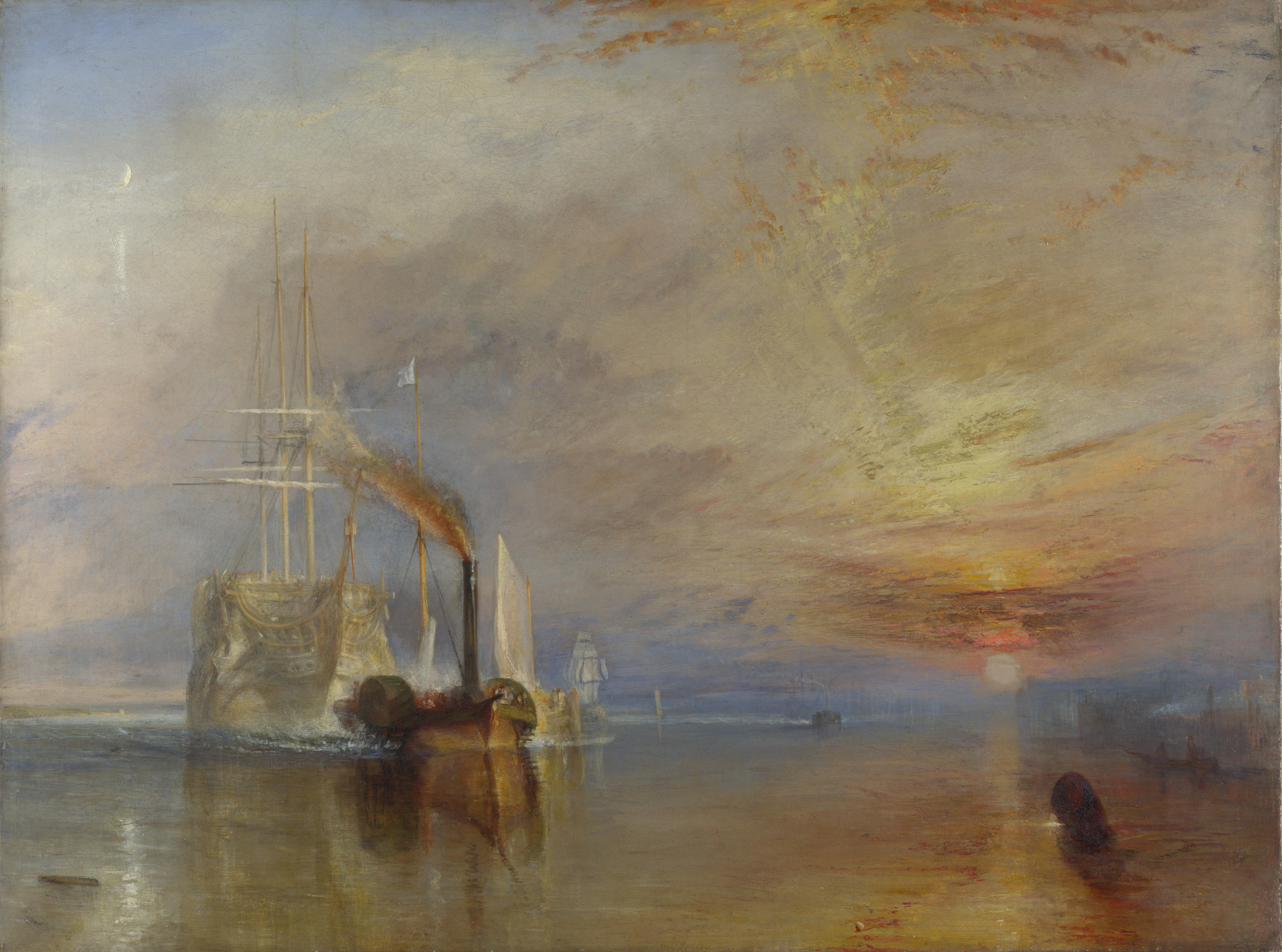
Turner's The Fighting Temeraire; 1839.

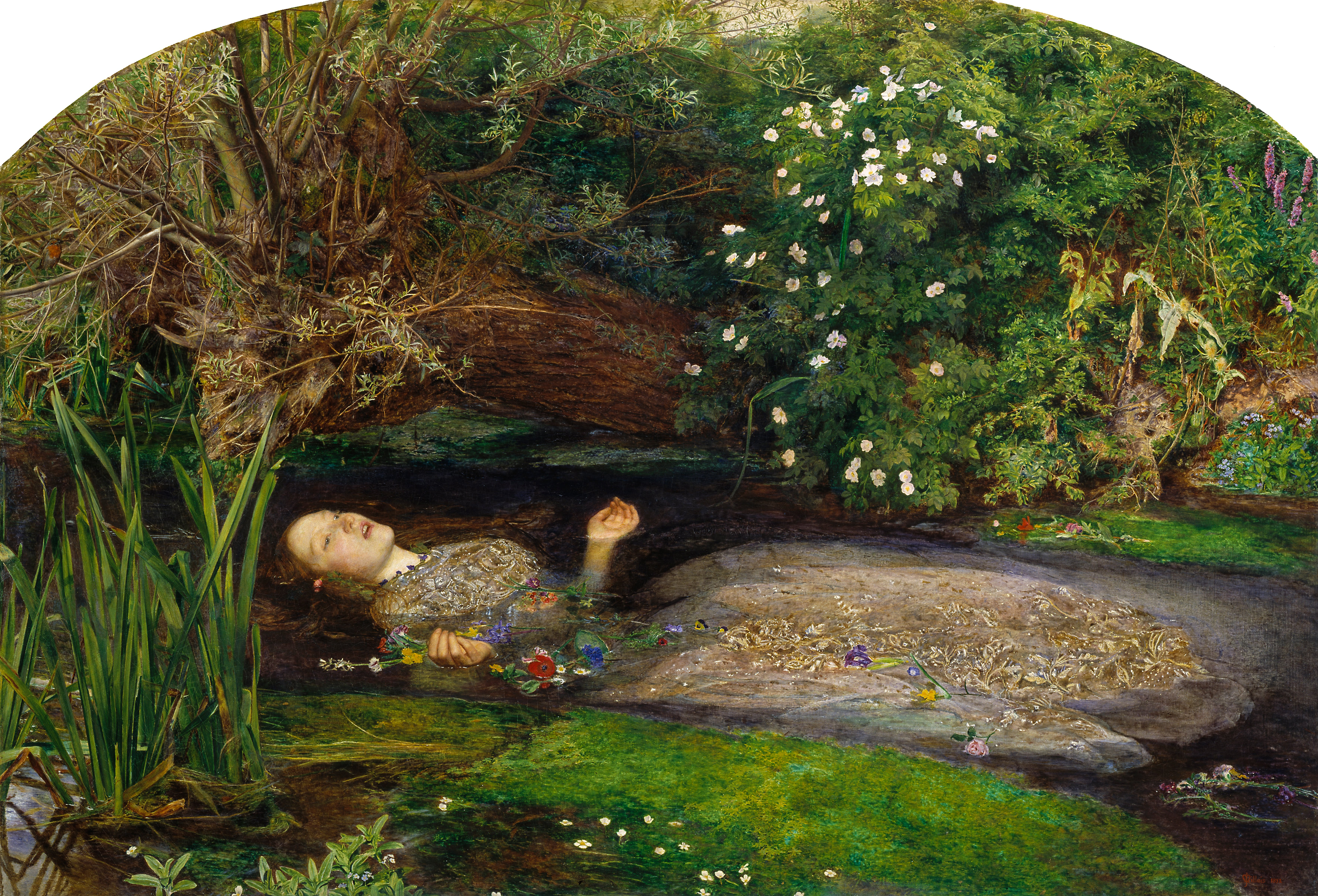
Millais's Ophelia; 1851–1852.

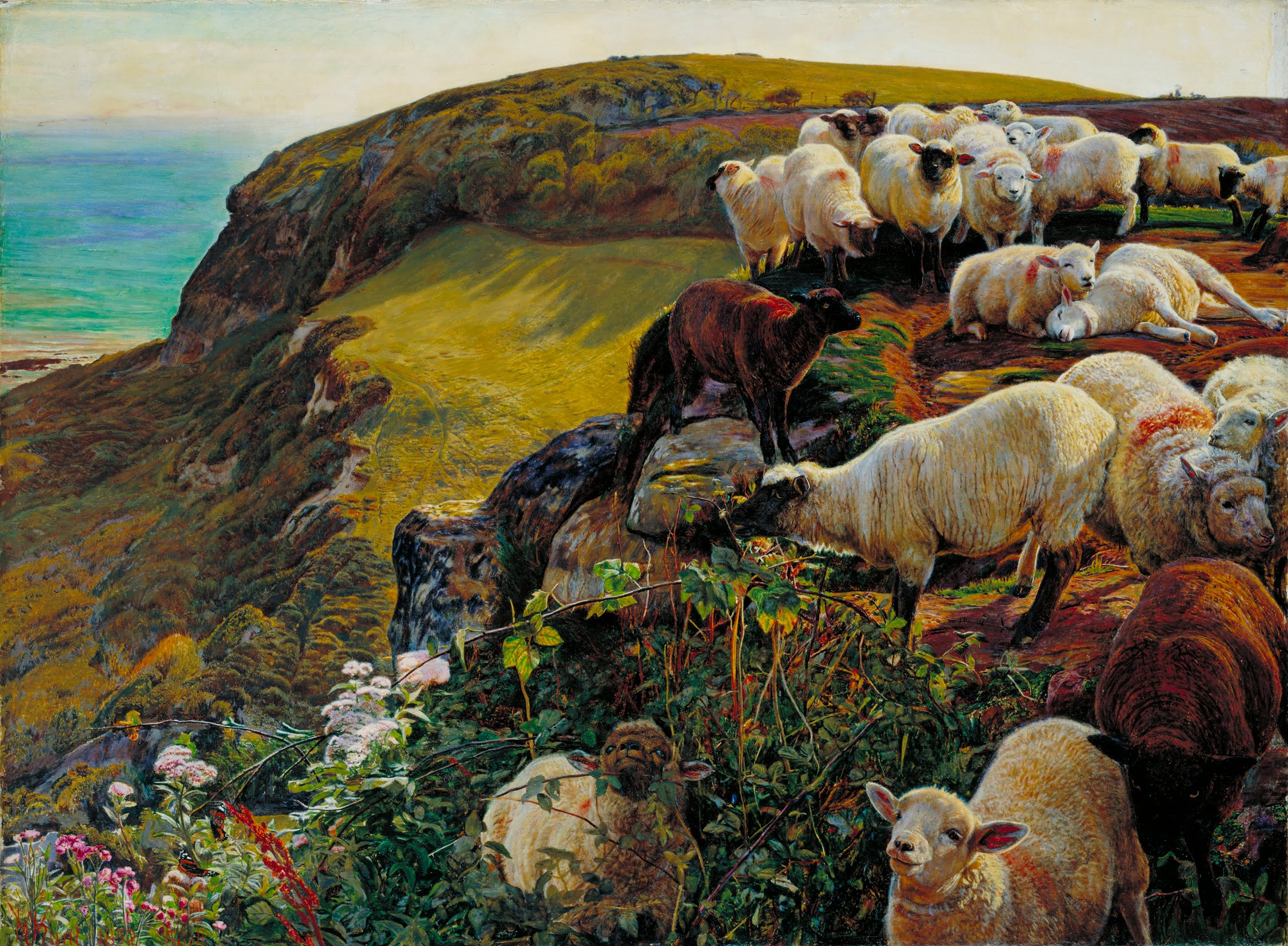
Holman Hunt's Our English Coasts; 1852.

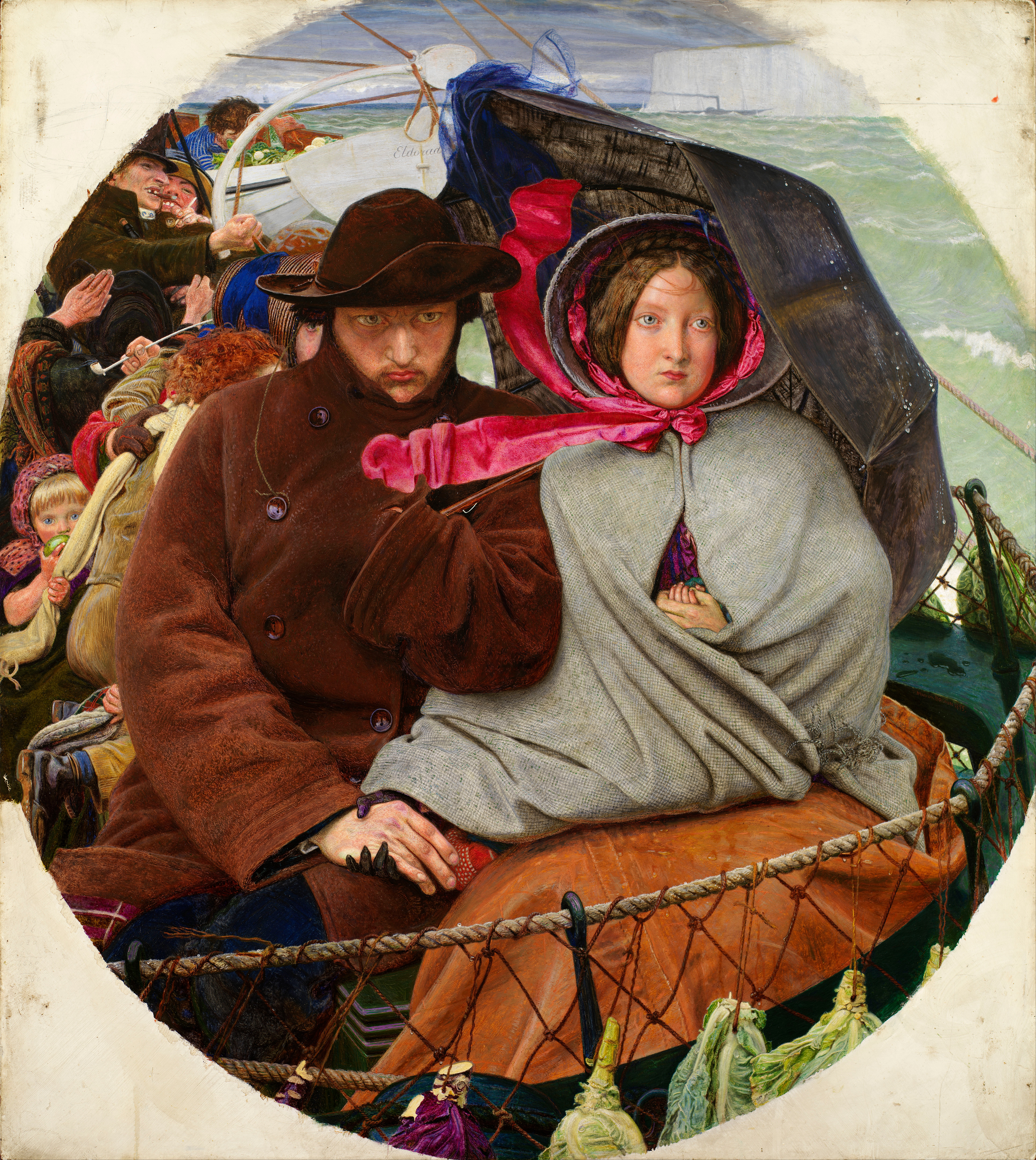
Ford Madox Brown's The Last of England; 1852–1855.

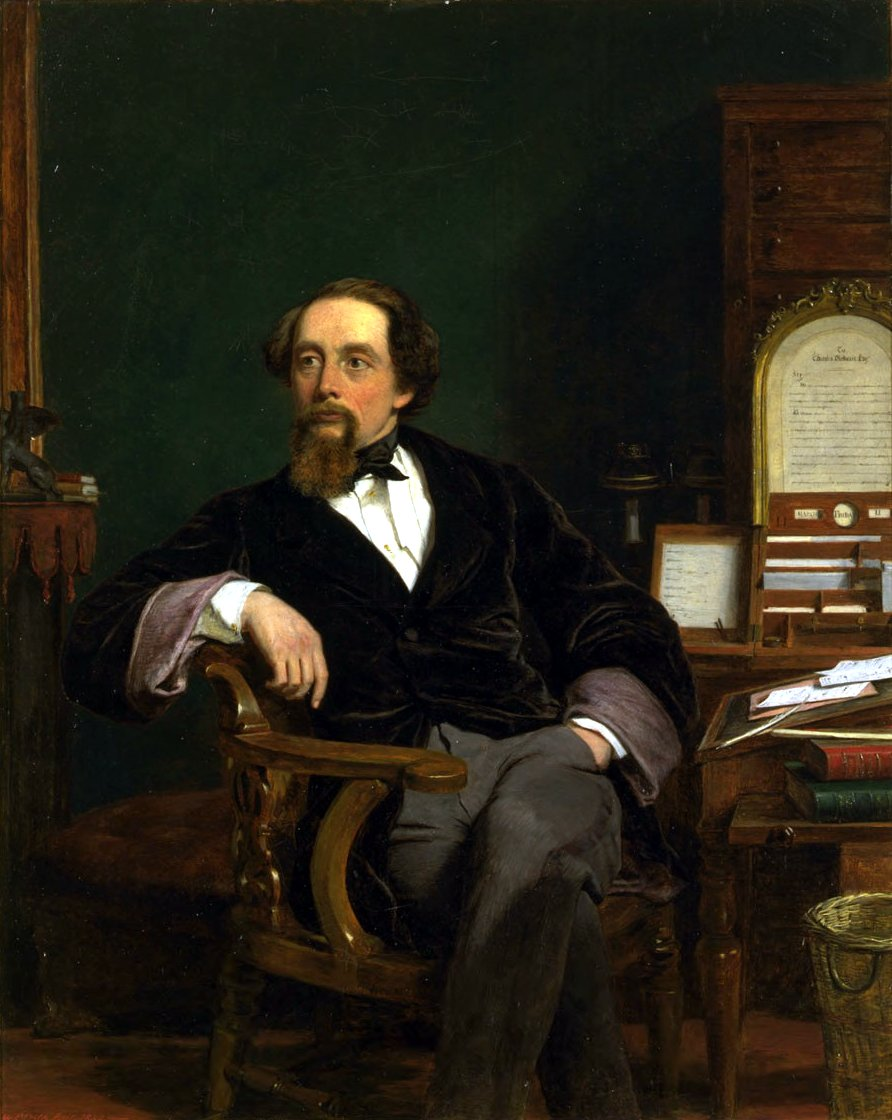
William Powell Frith's portrait of Dickens; 1859.

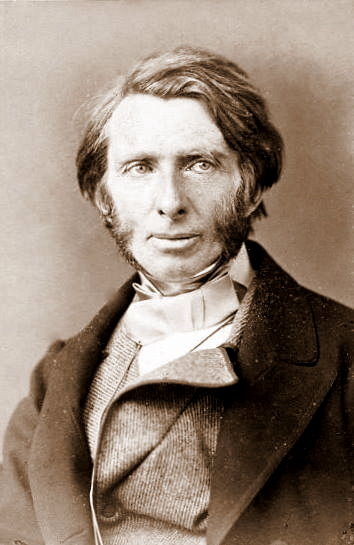
John Ruskin, leading English art critic of the Victorian era; 1867.

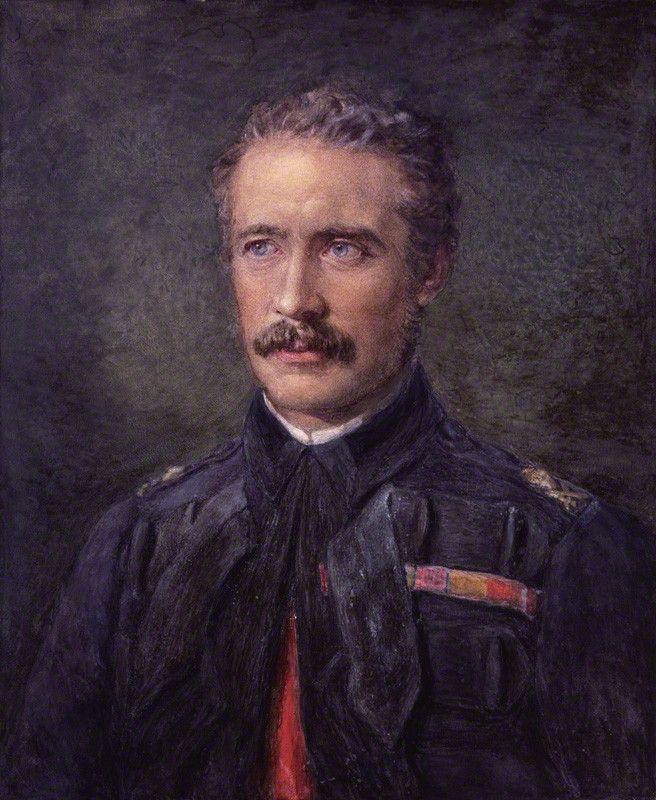
Julia, Lady Abercromby's portrait of General Gordon; after 1885.

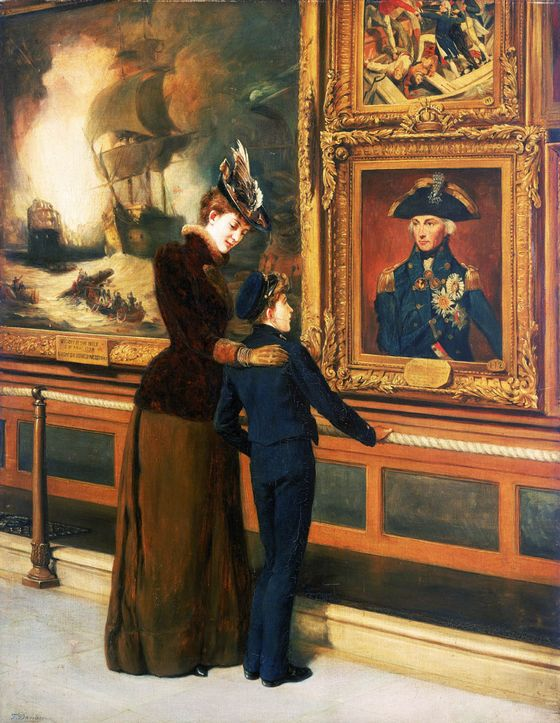
Thomas Davidson's England's Pride and Glory; 1894.

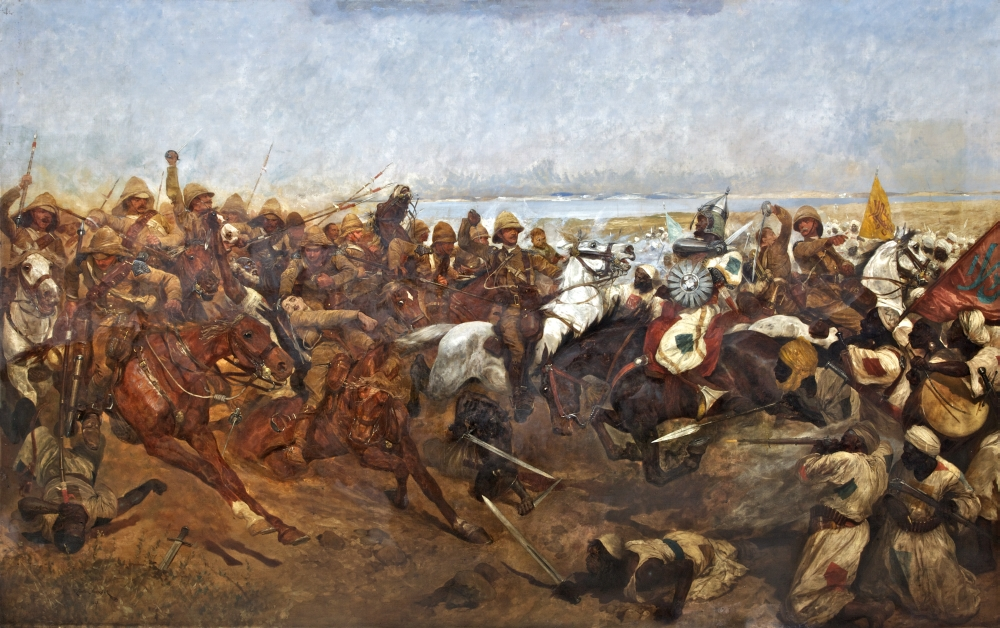
Woodville's The Charge of the 21st Lancers at the Battle of Omdurman, 2 September 1898; 1898.

== 20th century ==
Impressionism found a focus in the New English Art Club, founded in 1886. Notable members included Walter Sickert (1860–1942) and Philip Wilson Steer (1860–1942), two English painters with coterminous lives who became influential in the 20th century. Sickert went on to the post-impressionist Camden Town Group, active 1911–1913, and was prominent in the transition to Modernism. Steer's sea and landscape paintings made him a leading Impressionist, but later work displays a more traditional English style, influenced by both Constable and Turner.

Paul Nash (1889–1946) played a key role in the development of Modernism in English art. He was among the most important landscape artists of the first half of the twentieth century, and the artworks he produced during World War I are among the most iconic images of the conflict. Nash attended the Slade School of Art, where the remarkable generation of artists who studied under the influential Henry Tonks (1862–1937) included, too, Harold Gilman (1876–1919), Spencer Gore (1878–1914), David Bomberg (1890–1957), Stanley Spencer (1891–1959), Mark Gertler (1891–1939), and Roger Hilton (1911–1975).

Modernism's most controversial English talent was writer and painter Wyndham Lewis (1882–1957). He co-founded the Vorticist movement in art, and after becoming better known for his writing than his painting in the 1920s and early 1930s he returned to more concentrated work on visual art, with paintings from the 1930s and 1940s constituting some of his best-known work. Walter Sickert called Wyndham Lewis: "the greatest portraitist of this or any other time". Modernist sculpture was exemplified by English artists Henry Moore (1898–1986), well known for his carved marble and larger-scale abstract cast bronze sculptures, and Barbara Hepworth (1903–1975), who was a leading figure in the colony of artists who resided in St Ives, Cornwall during World War II.

Lancastrian L. S. Lowry (1887–1976) became famous for his scenes of life in the industrial districts of North West England in the mid-20th century. He developed a distinctive style of painting and is best known for his urban landscapes peopled with human figures often referred to as "matchstick men".

Notable English artists of the mid-20th century and after include: Graham Sutherland (1903–1980); Carel Weight (1908–1997); Ruskin Spear (1911–1990); pop art pioneers Richard Hamilton (1922–2011), Peter Blake (b. 1932), and David Hockney (b. 1937); and op art exemplar Bridget Riley (b. 1931).

Following the development of Postmodernism, English art became in some respect synonymous toward the end of the 20th century with the Turner Prize; the prize, established in 1984 and named with ostensibly credible intentions after J. M. W. Turner, earned for latterday English art a reputation arguably to its detriment. Prize exhibits have included a shark in formaldehyde and a dishevelled bed.

While the Turner Prize establishment satisfied itself with weak conceptual homages to authentic iconoclasts like Duchamp and Manzoni, it spurned original talents such as Beryl Cook (1926–2008). The award ceremony has since 2000 attracted annual demonstrations by the "Stuckists", a group calling for a return to figurative art and aesthetic authenticity. Observing wryly that "the only artist who wouldn't be in danger of winning the Turner Prize is Turner", the Stuckists staged in 2000 a "Real Turner Prize 2000" exhibition, promising (by contrast) "no rubbish".

=== 20th century: gallery ===
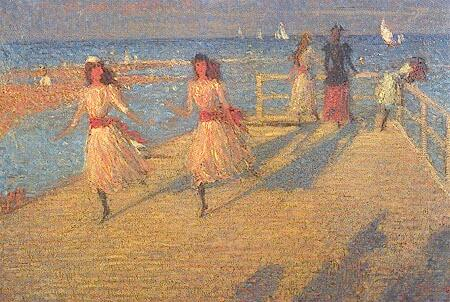
Philip Wilson Steer's Girls Running, Walberswick Pier; 1888–94.

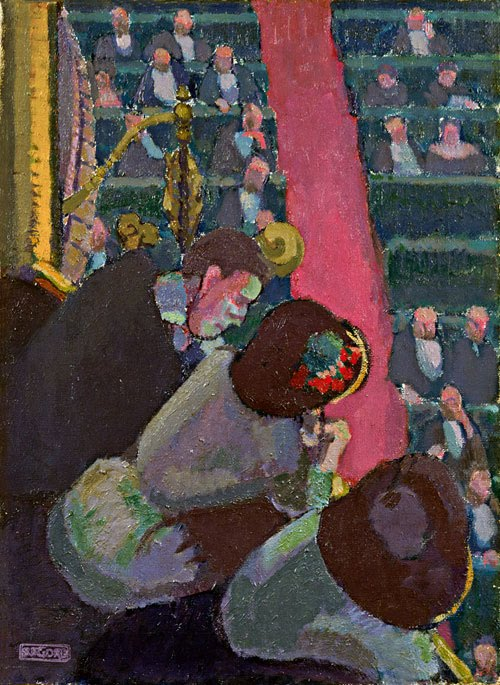
Spencer Gore's Balcony at the Alhambra; 1910–11.

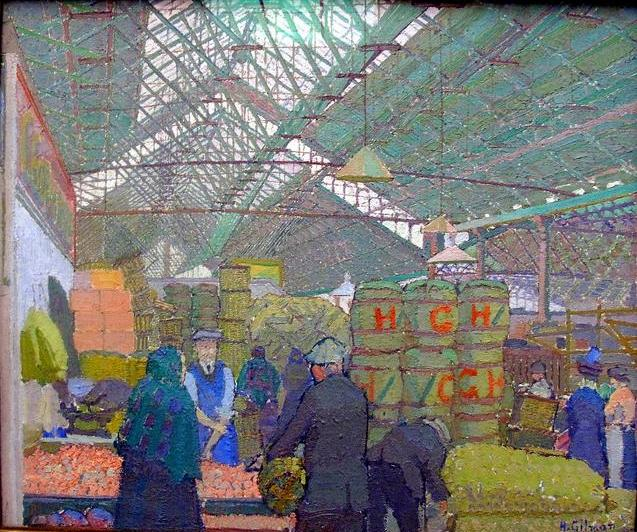
Harold Gilman's Leeds market; c. 1913.

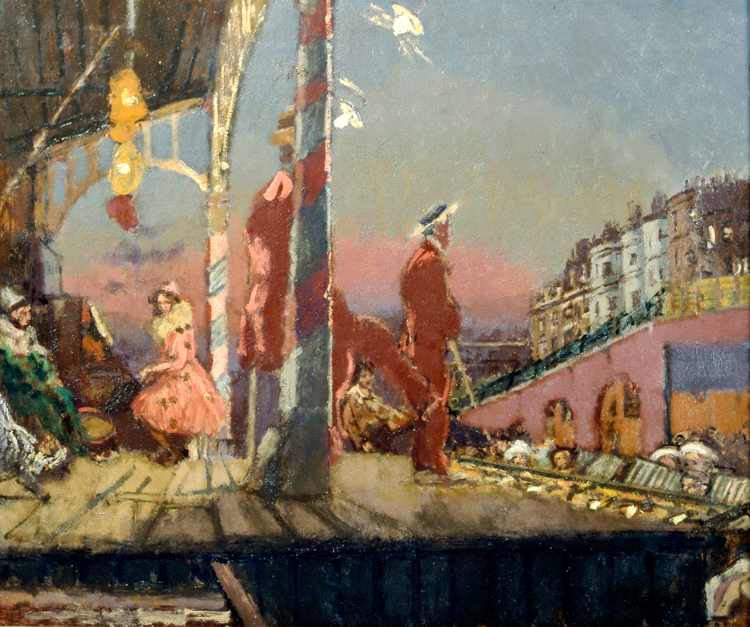
Walter Sickert's Brighton Pierrots; 1915.

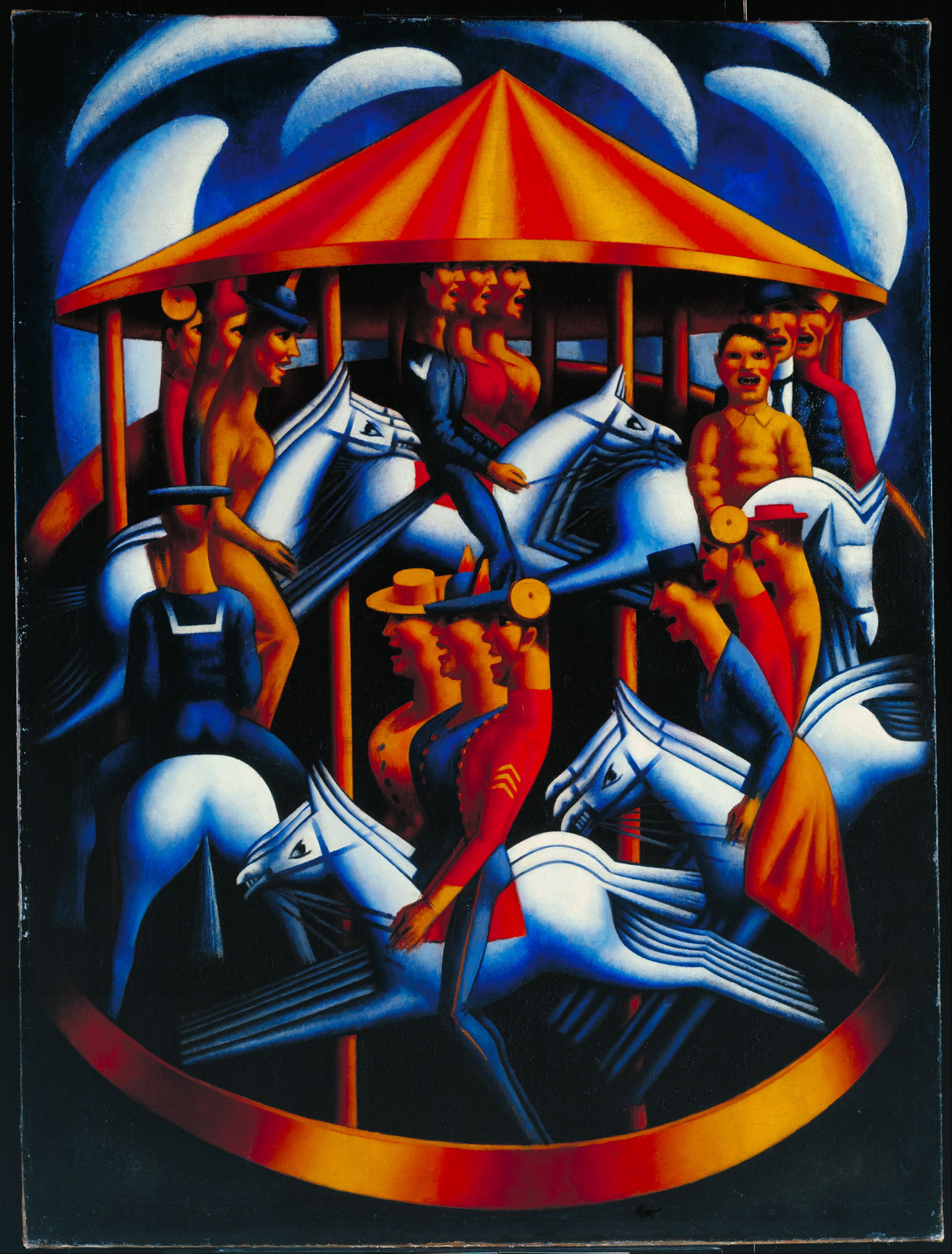
Mark Gertler's Merry-Go-Round; 1916.

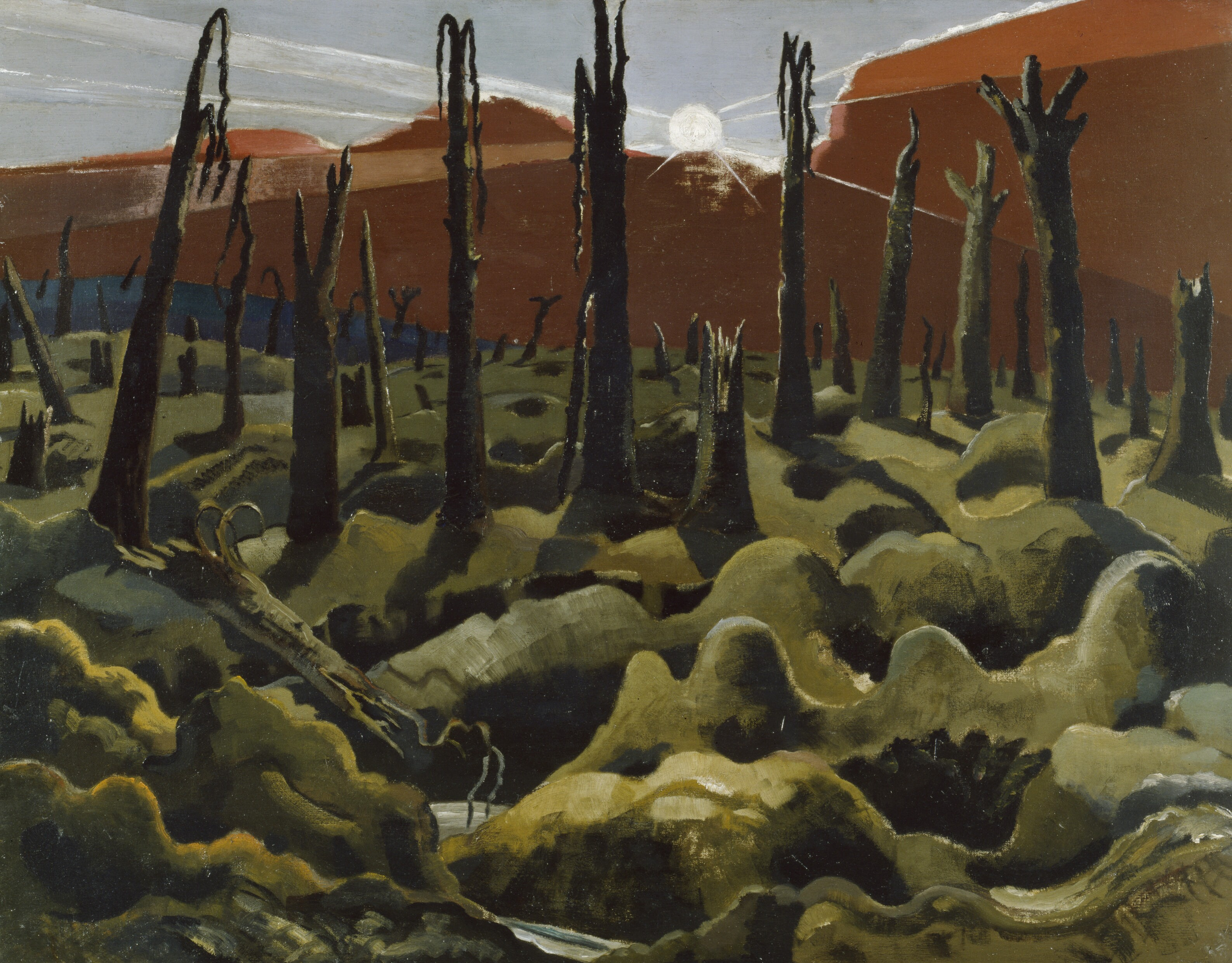
Paul Nash's We are Making a New World; 1918.

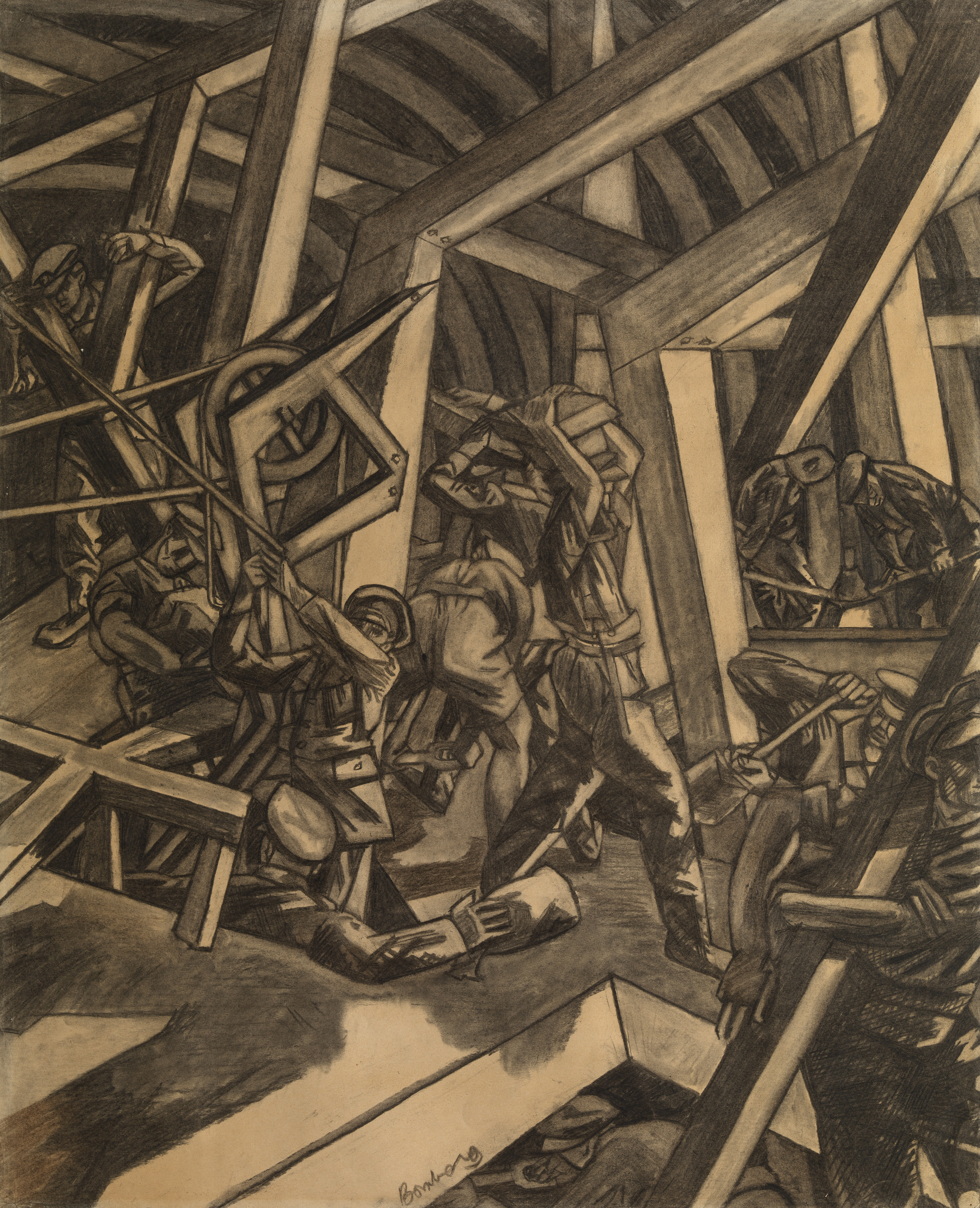
David Bomberg's Sappers at Work: Canadian Tunnelling Company, R14, St Eloi; 1918.

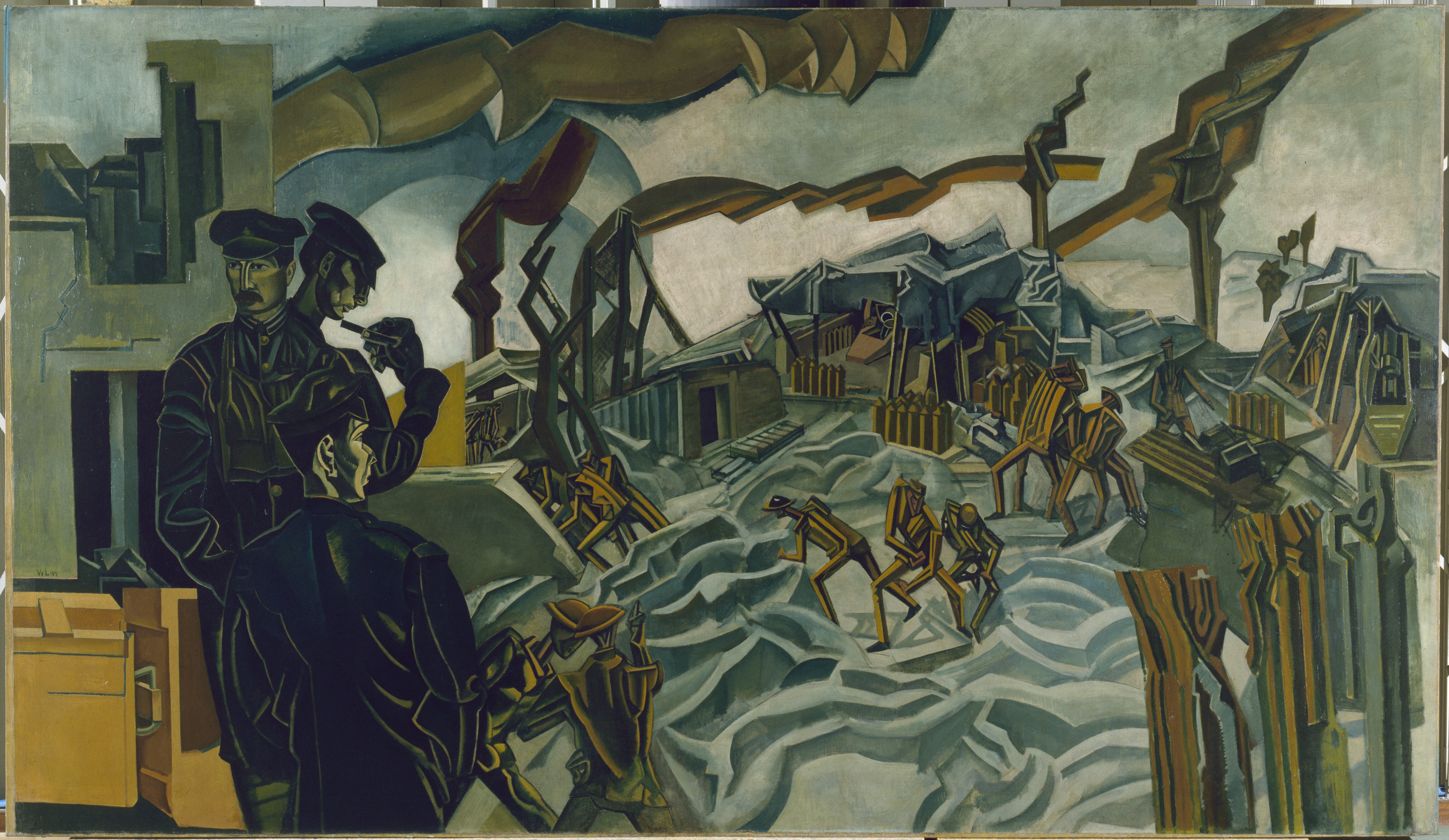
Wyndham Lewis's A Battery Shelled; 1919.

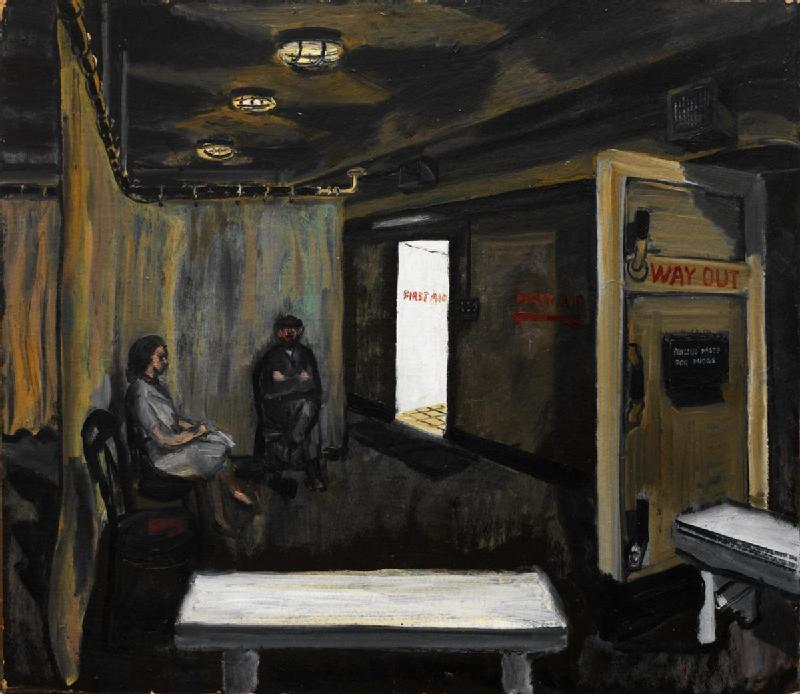
Ruskin Spear's Patients waiting Outside a First Aid Post in a Factory; 1942.

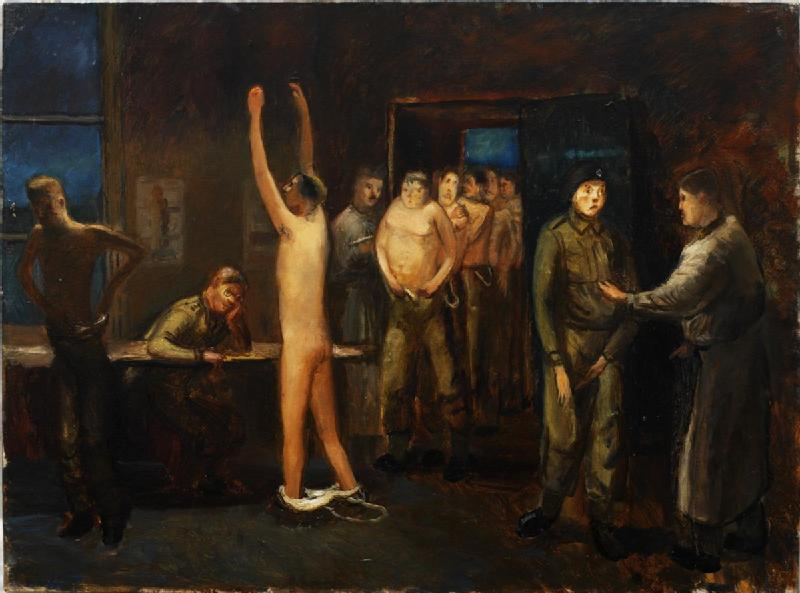
Carel Weight's Recruit's Progress; 1942.

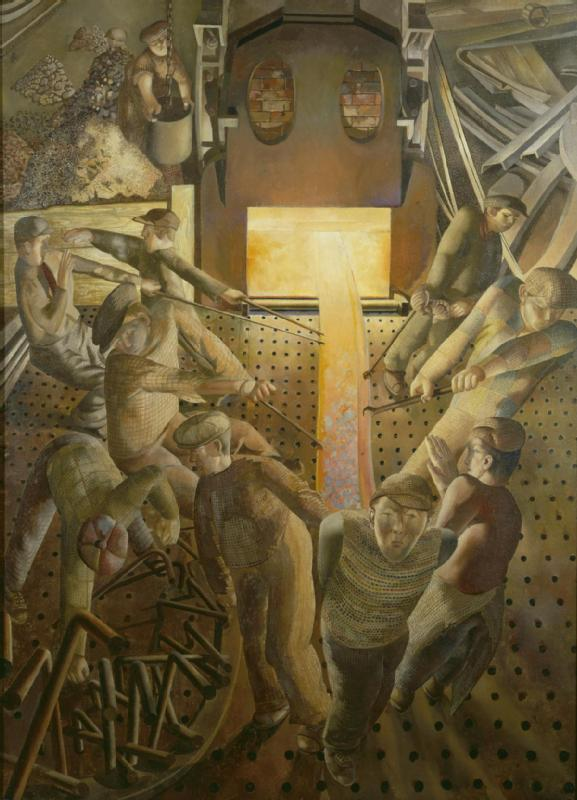
Stanley Spencer's Shipbuilding on the Clyde: The Furnaces; 1946.

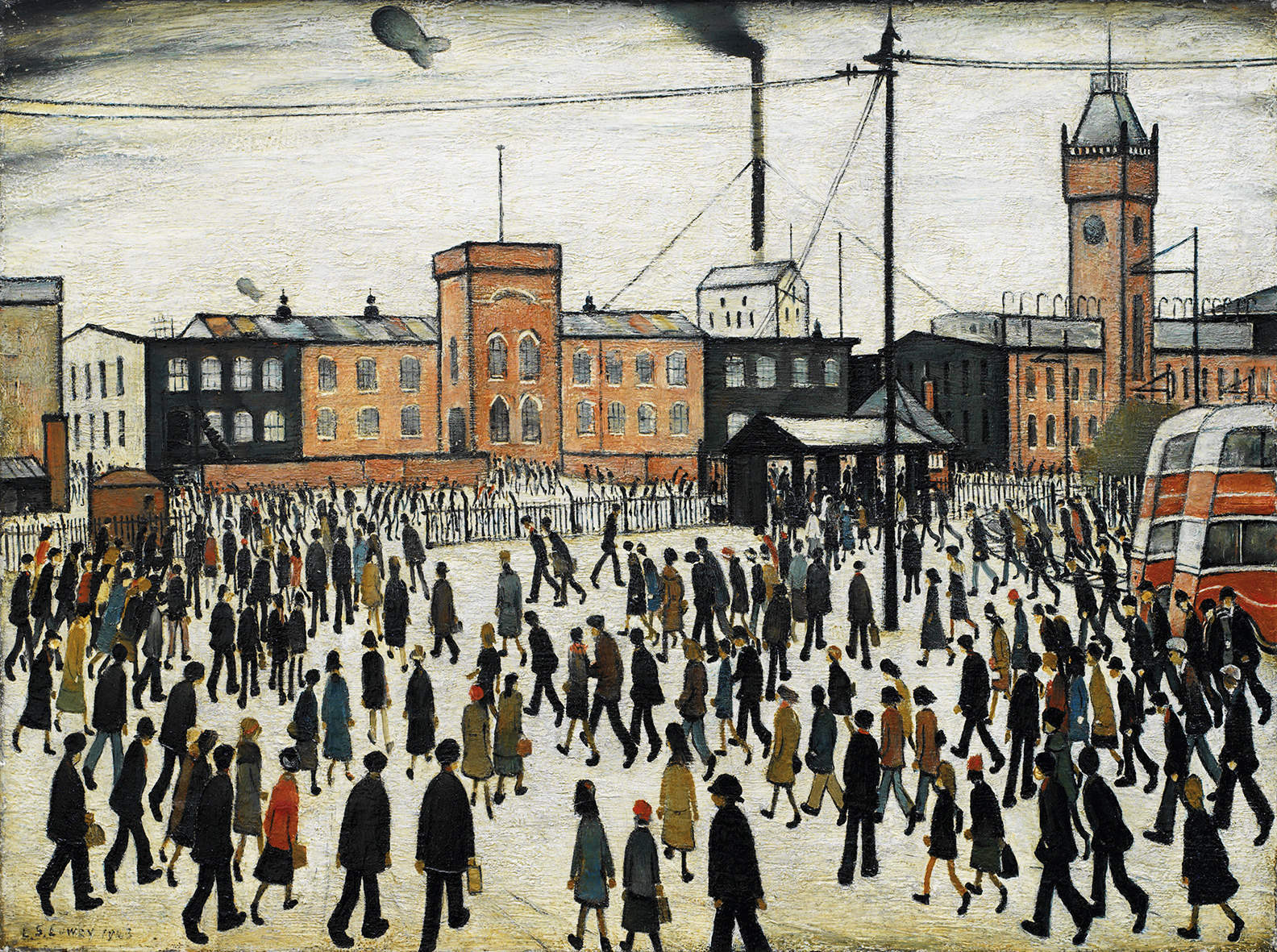
L. S. Lowry's Going to Work; 1959.

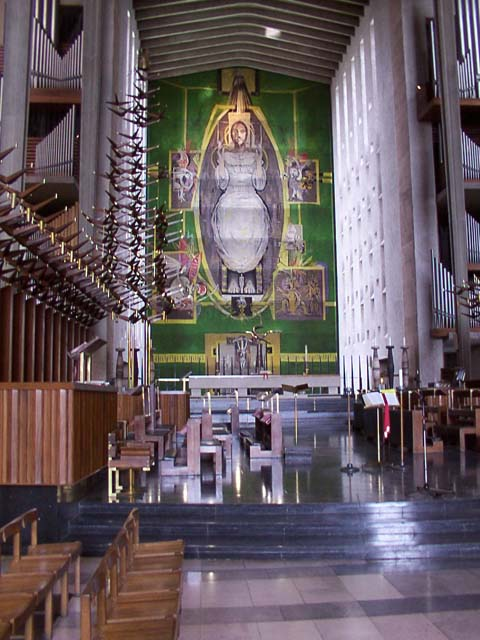
Graham Sutherland's Christ tapestry in the rebuilt Coventry Cathedral; 1962.

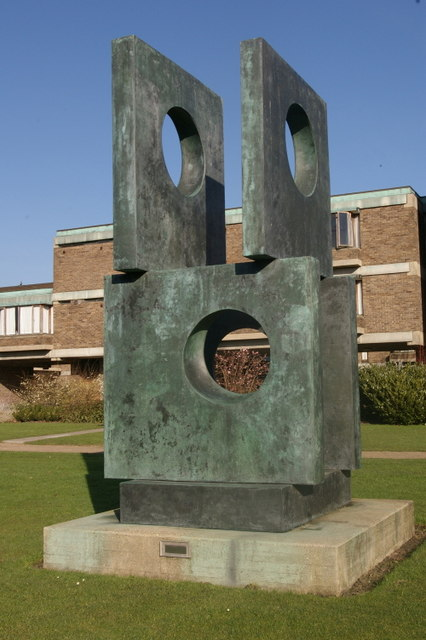
Barbara Hepworth's Four-Square (Walk Through); 1966.

== 21st century ==
The sculptor Antony Gormley (b. 1950) expressed doubts a decade after winning the Turner Prize about his "usefulness to the human race", and work including Another Place (2005) and Event Horizon (2012) has achieved both acclaim and popularity. The pseudo-subversive urban art of Banksy, has been much discussed in the media.

A highly visible and much praised work of public art, seen for a brief period in 2014 was Blood Swept Lands and Seas of Red, a collaboration between artist Paul Cummins (b. 1977) and theatre designer Tom Piper. The installation at the Tower of London between July and November 2014 commemorated the centenary of the outbreak of World War I; it consisted of 888,246 ceramic red poppies, each intended to represent one British or Colonial serviceman killed in the War.

Leading contemporary printmakers include Norman Ackroyd and Richard Spare.

== English art on display ==
- British Museum
- Delaware Art Museum
- National Gallery
- National Portrait Gallery
- Tate Britain
- Victoria and Albert Museum
- Walker Art Gallery
- Yale Center for British Art

== See also ==
- Art of the United Kingdom
- Arts Council England
- List of British painters
- Museums in England
- Royal Collection
