= Portrait of Joseph Nollekens =

Portrait of Joseph Nollekens may refer to:

- Portrait of Joseph Nollekens (Beechey), an 1812 painting by William Beechey
- Portrait of Joseph Nollekens (Abbott), a 1797 painting by Lemuel Francis Abbot
