= Exhibition of National Portraits =

The Exhibition of National Portraits was a series of three grand exhibitions in London at the South Kensington Museum between 1866 and 1868. The first one opened in April 1866, and contained portraits of people from or linked to the history of England until the Glorious Revolution. The second exhibition displayed portraits between the Glorious Revolution and 1800, with the final exhibition showing portraits from people living after 1800, including living people. The second and third exhibition also included portraits that by right should have been present in one of the previous exhibitions, but weren't shown then. The third exhibition for example showed 9 works attributed to Hans Holbein, 9 works by Anthony van Dyck, 27 by Reynolds and 34 by Gainsborough, even though they should normally have been shown in the previous exhibitions.

The 1866 exhibition, lasting from 16 April until 18 August, had 73,156 visitors for 1035 pictures, including works by Hans Memling and Hans Holbein the Younger. The 1867 exhibition, held between 2 May and 31 August, showed 866 portraits, many of them by Joshua Reynolds and Thomas Gainsborough, and received 49,385 visitors. The third exhibition opened on 13 April 1868, with 951 portraits. When it closed on 22 August, there had been 58,336 visitors. The catalogues of the three exhibitions sold over 16,000 copies for the first year, and over 8,000 copies each for the other two years.

== Pictures included in the 1866 exhibition ==
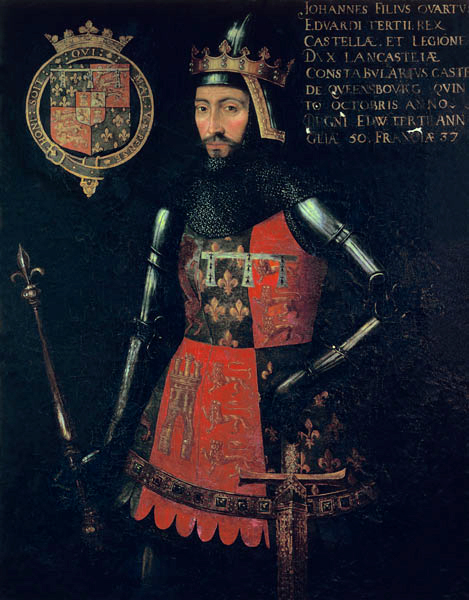
John of Gaunt, 1st Duke of Lancaster, ascribed to Lucas Cornelisz de Kock

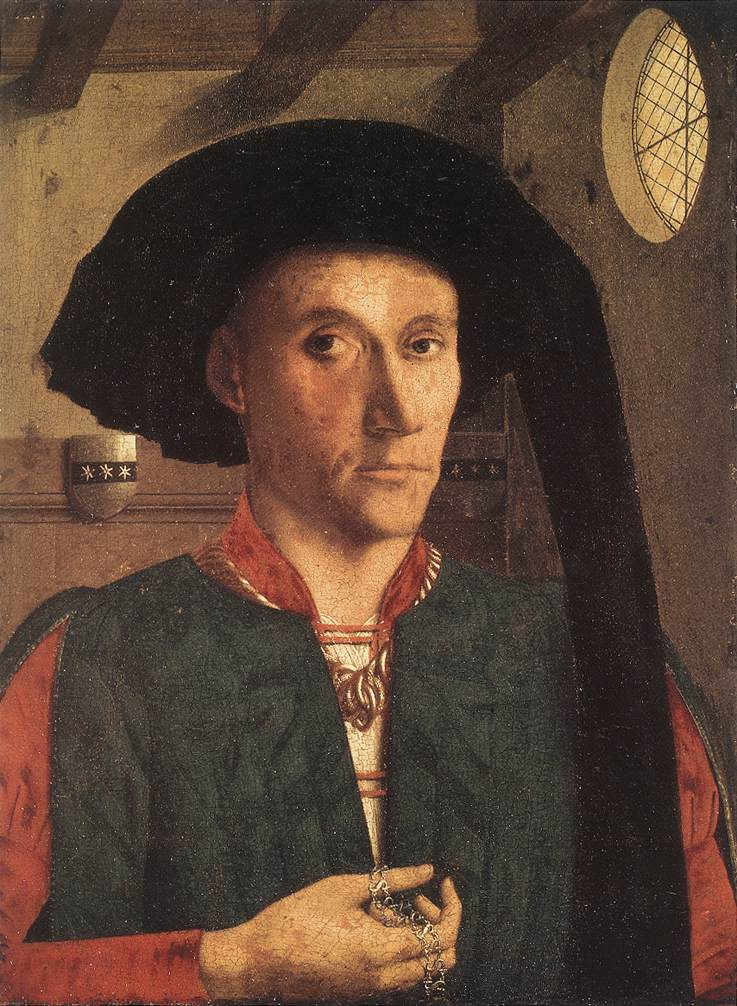
Edward Grimston, by Petrus Christus

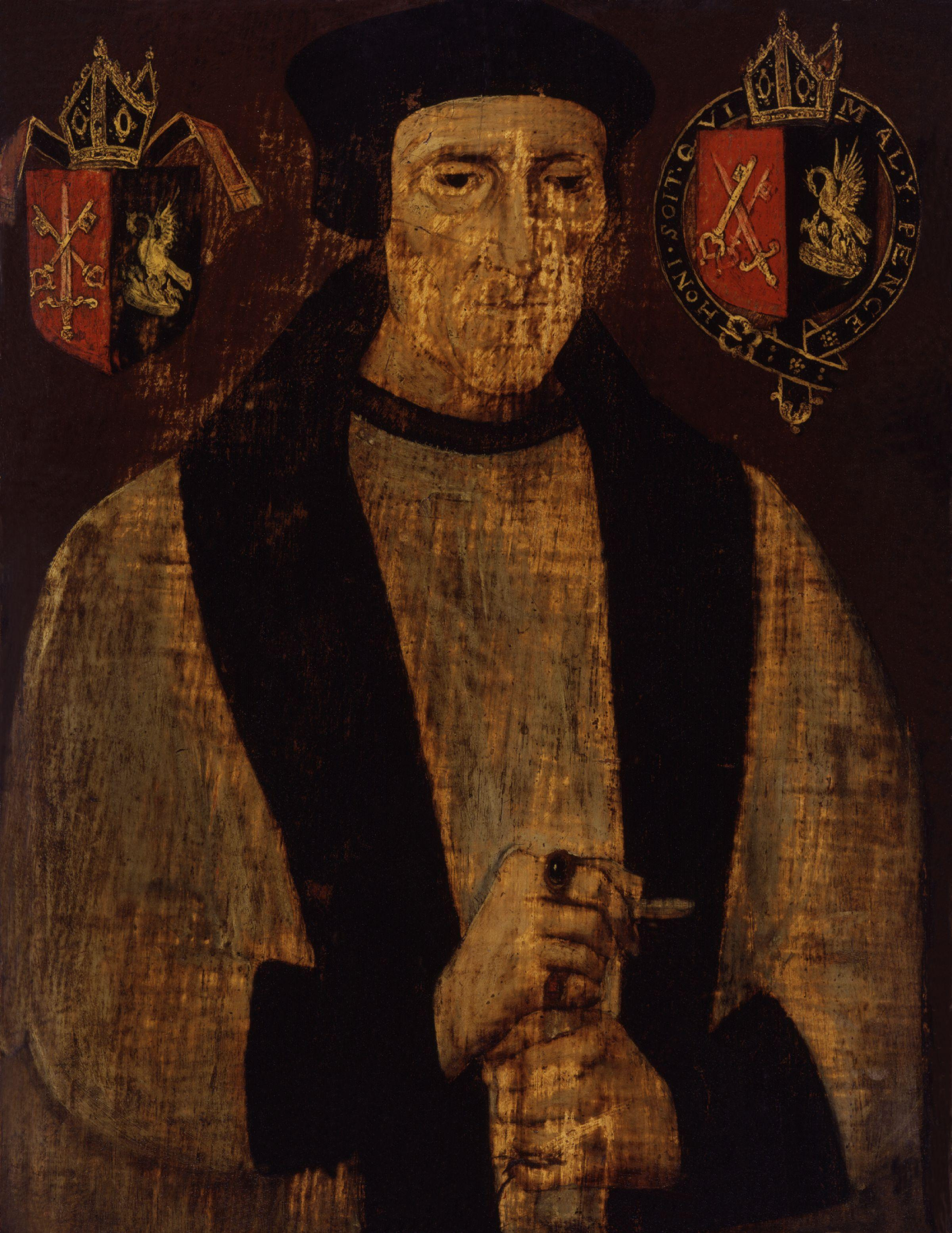
Richard Foxe by Johannes Corvus

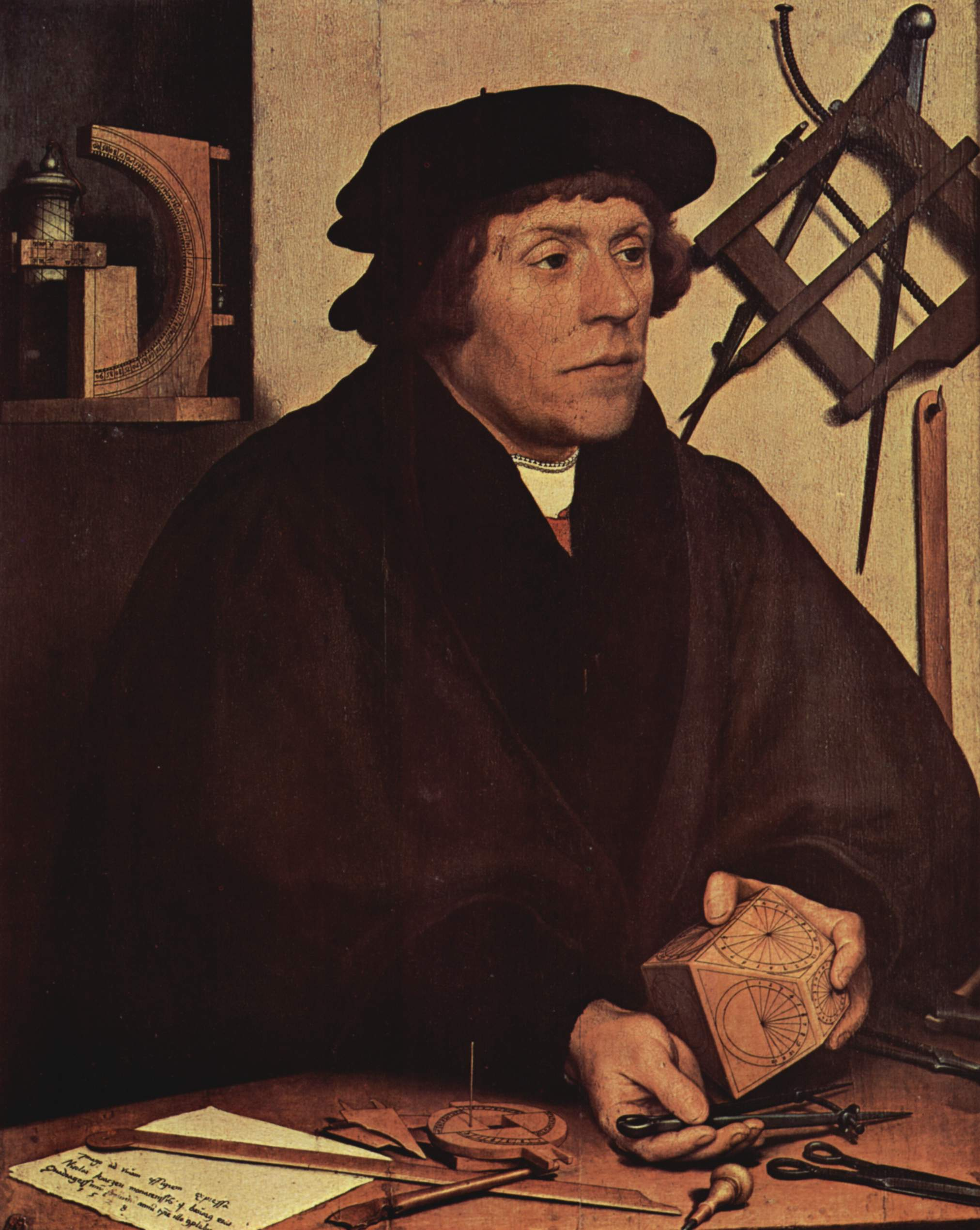
Nicholas Kratzer by Hans Holbein the Younger

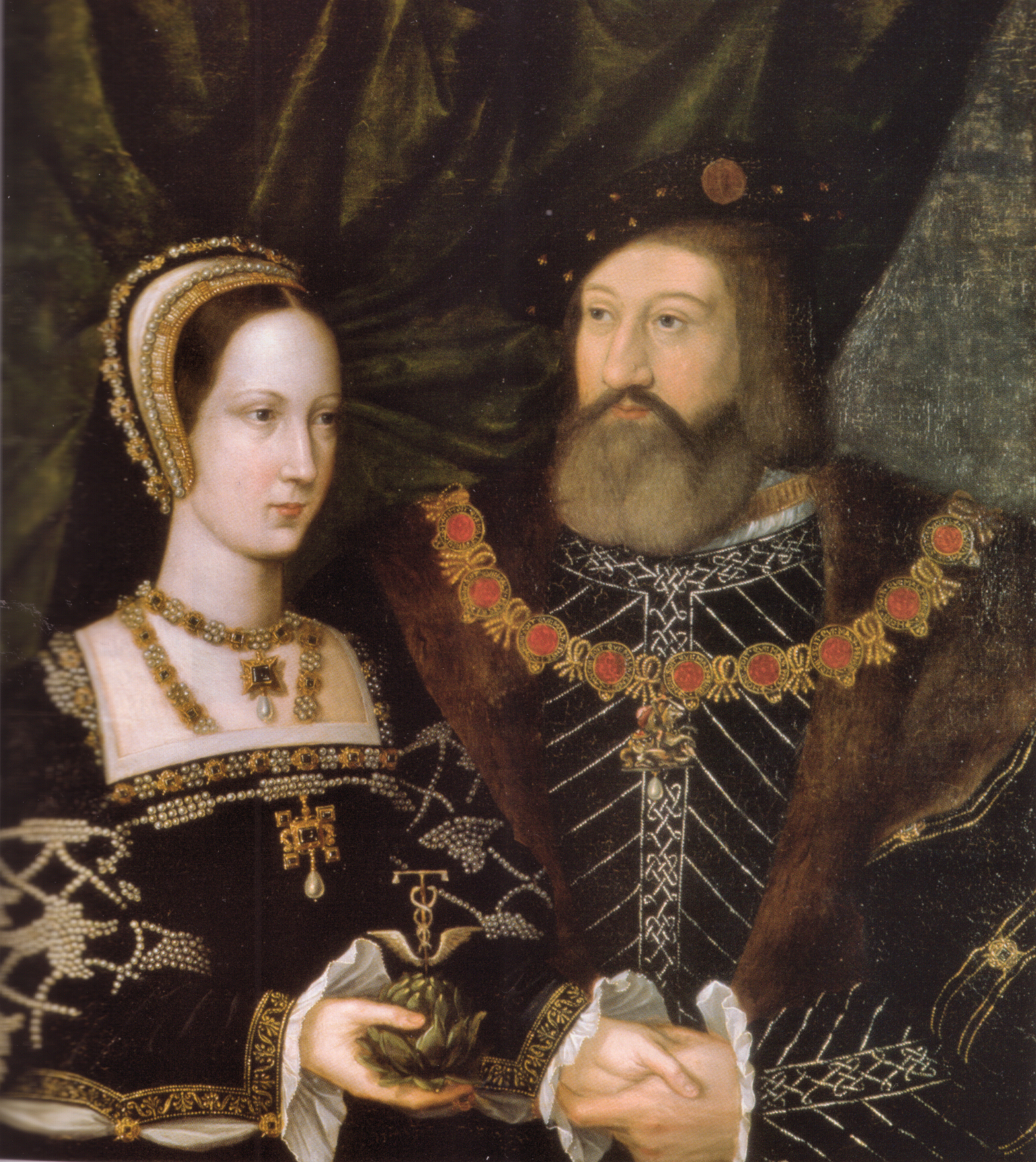
Mary Tudor, Queen of France and Charles Brandon, 1st Duke of Suffolk by Jan Mabuse

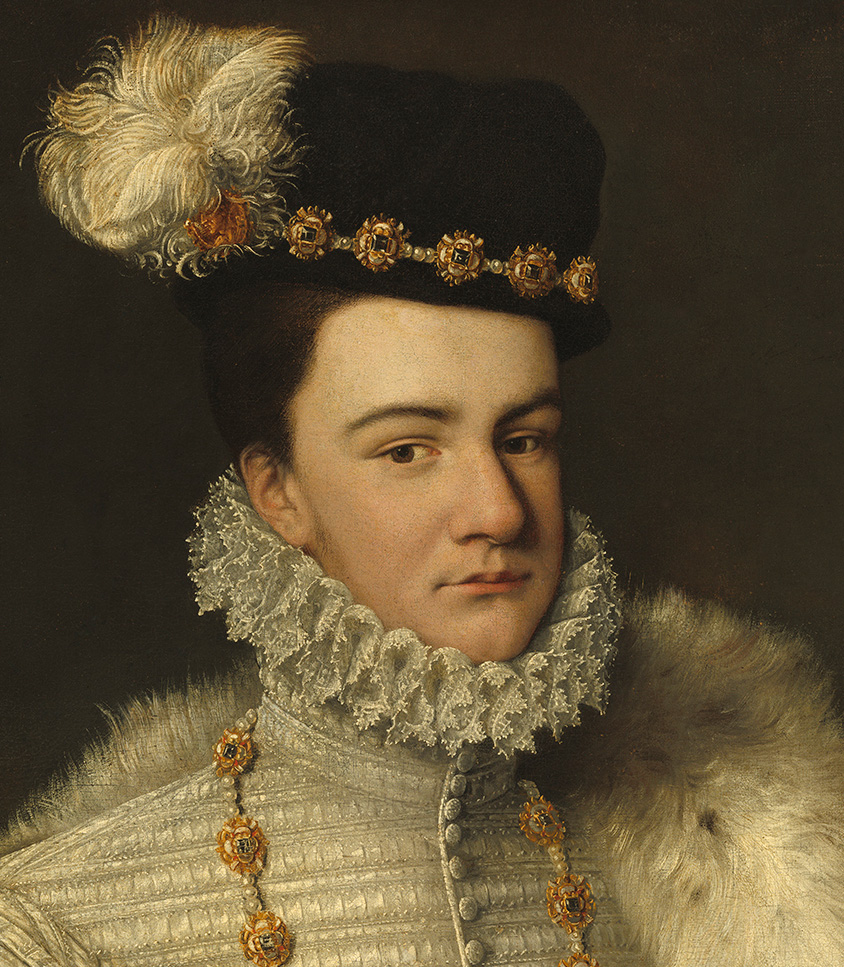
Francis, Duke of Anjou by François Clouet

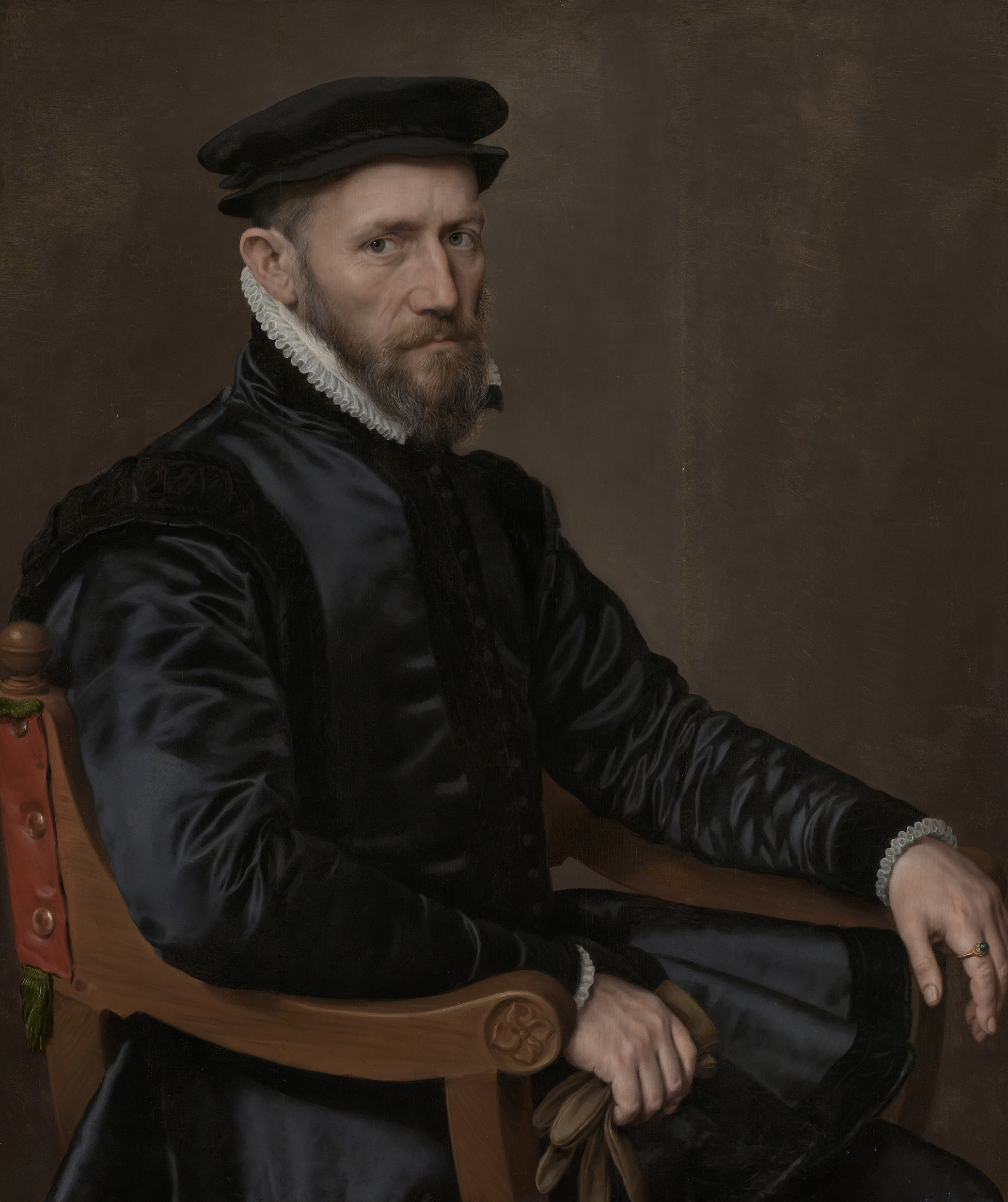
Thomas Gresham by Antonis Mor

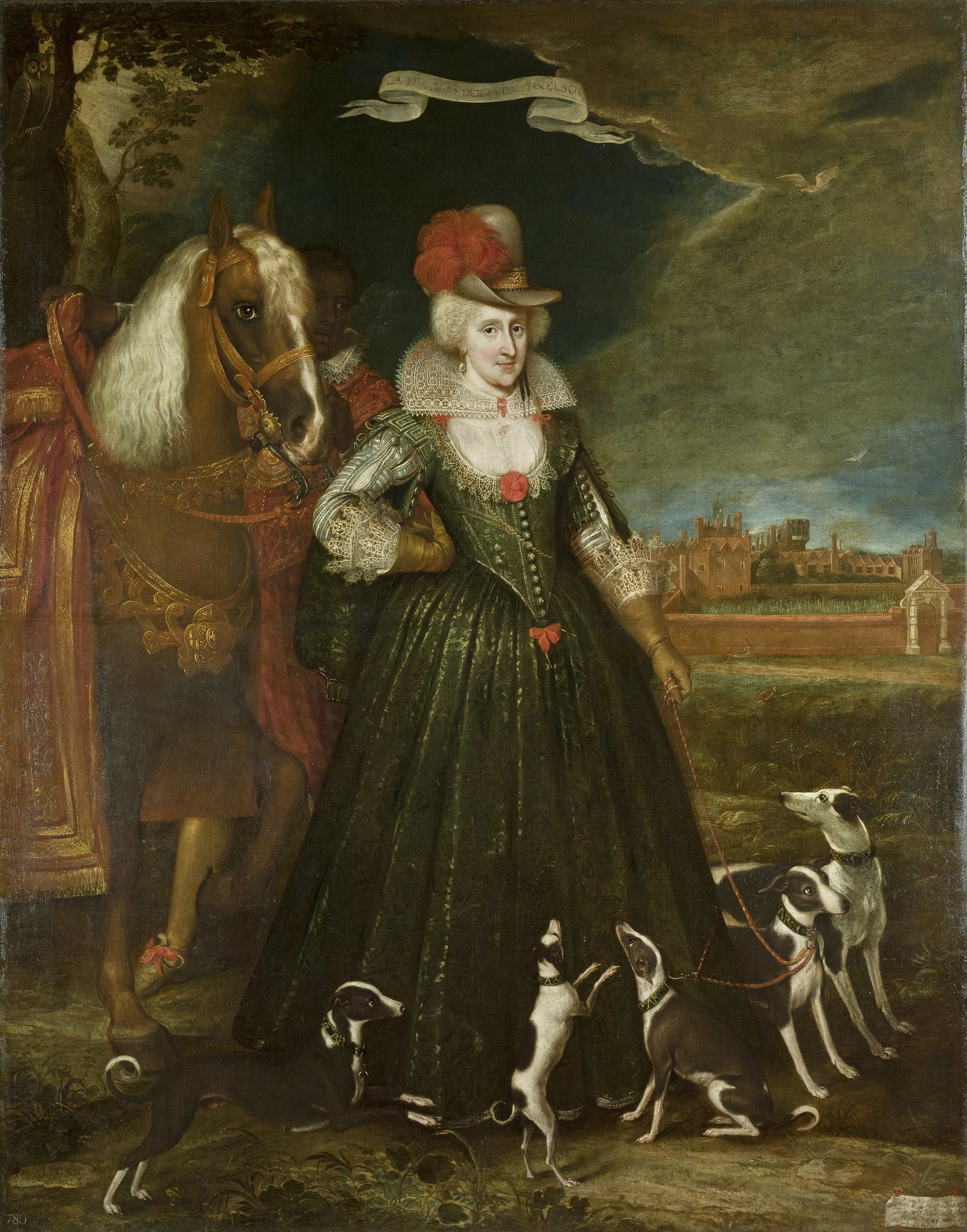
Anne of Denmark by Paul van Somer I

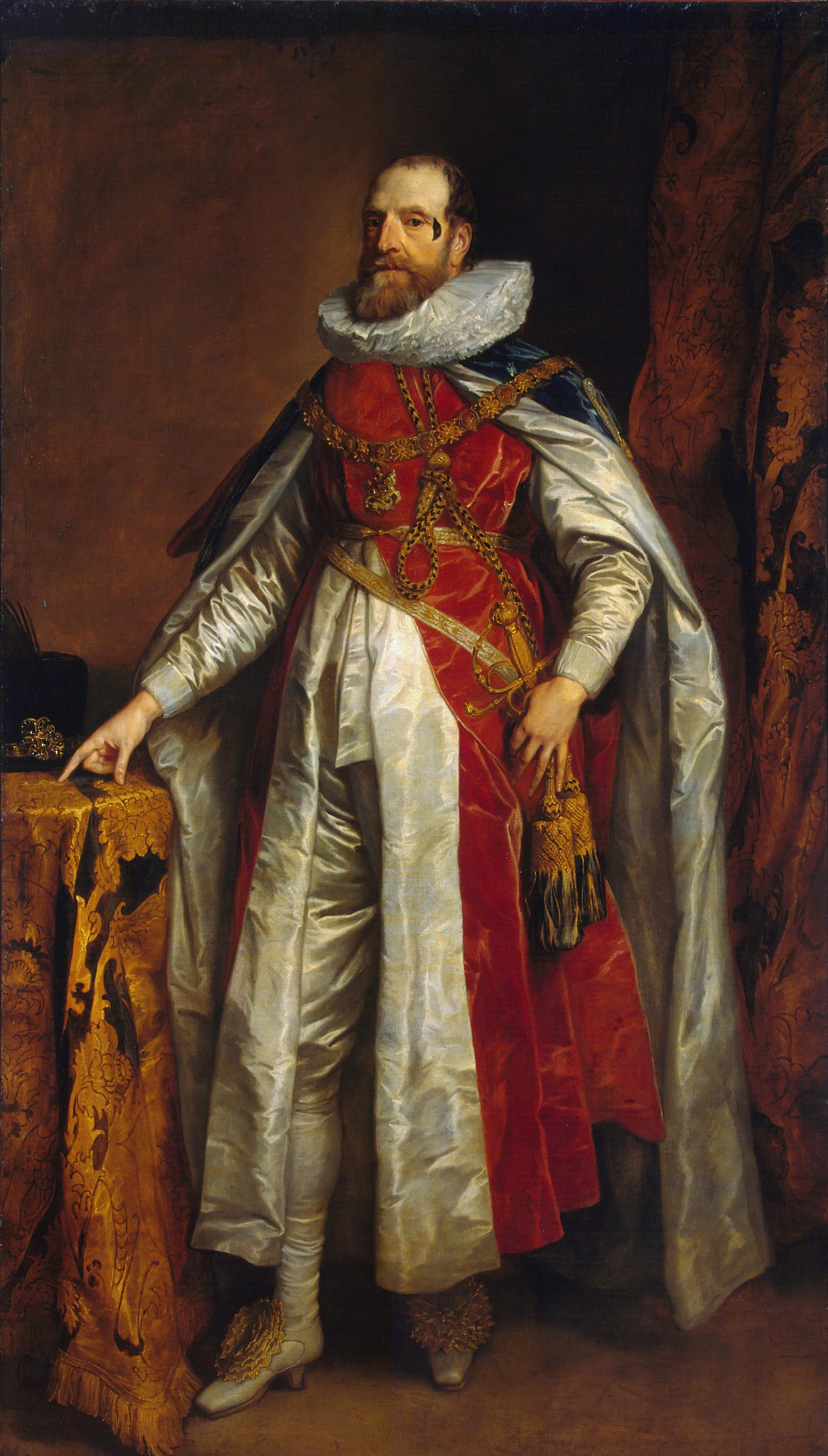
Henry Danvers, 1st Earl of Danby by Anthony van Dyck

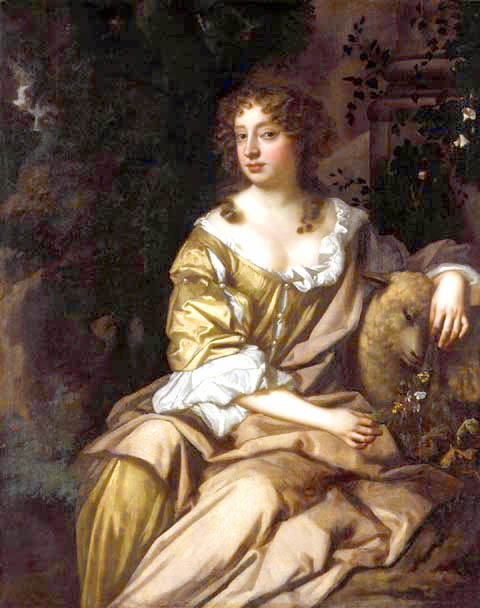
Nell Gwyn by Peter Lely

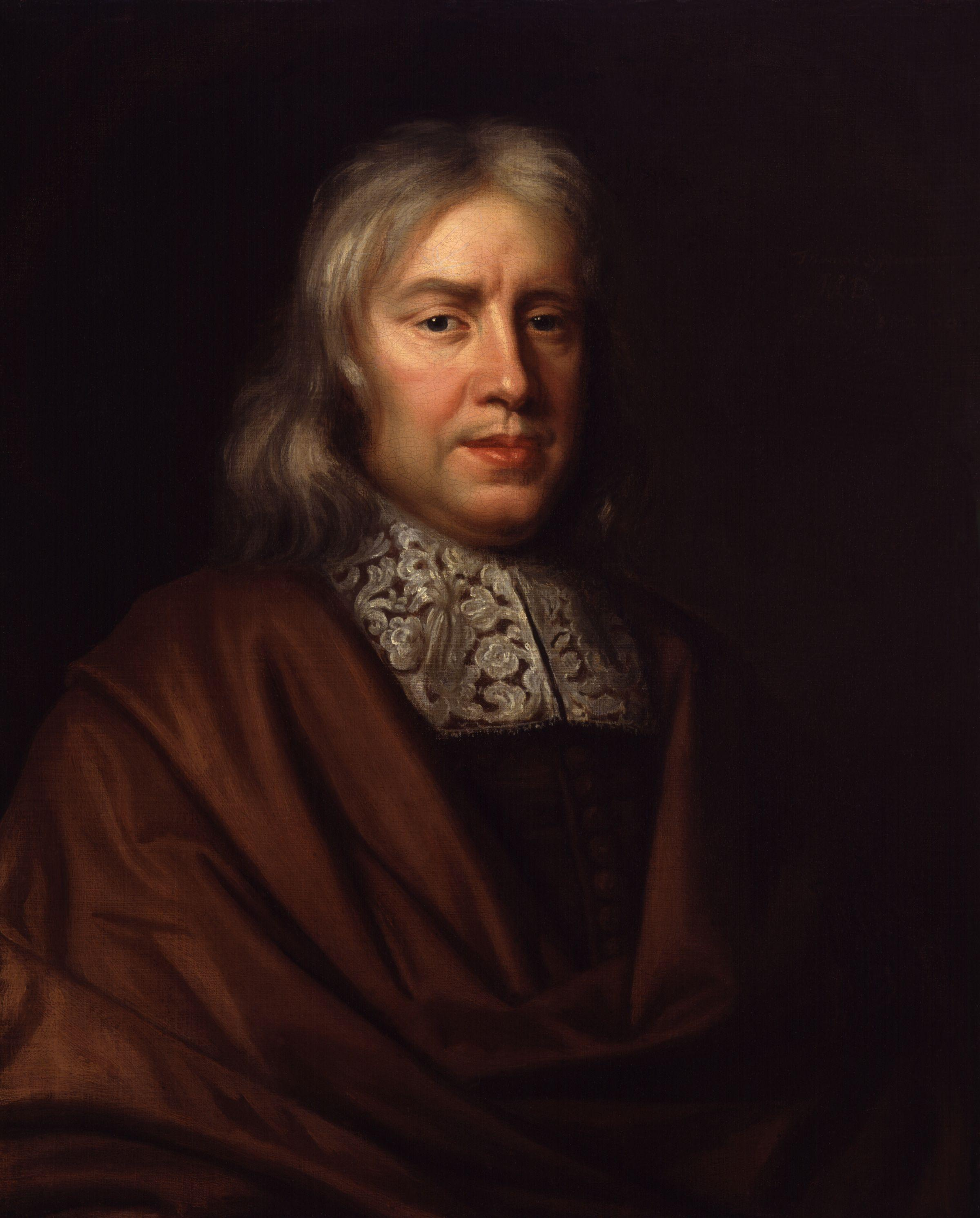
Thomas Sydenham by Mary Beale

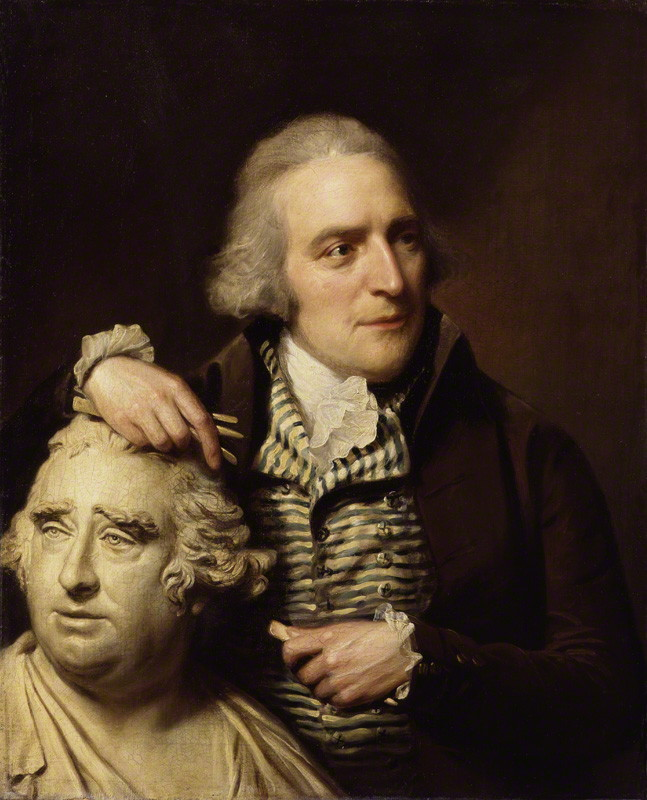
Portrait of Joseph Nollekens by Lemuel Francis Abbott, 1797
