= Jan Baptist Nollekens =

Flemish painter

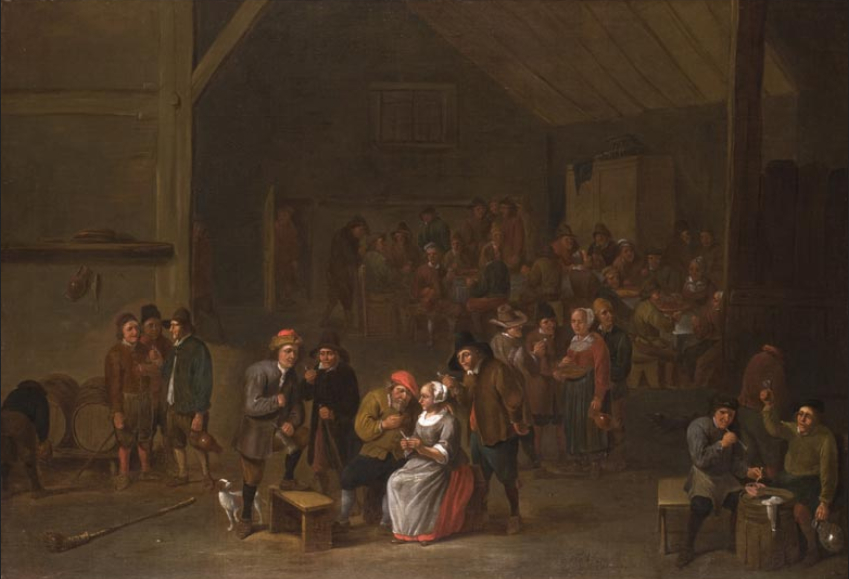
Interior of an inn with a large company

Jan Baptist Nollekens (1665 – after 1720) was a Flemish painter specializing in genre and still life paintings. His genre paintings depict scenes of drinkers, card players, peasants, merry companies and artist studios. His known still life paintings are hunting pieces. He was active in Flanders, the Dutch Republic, England and France.

== Life ==
Little is known about the life and training of Jan Baptist Nollekens. He was born in Antwerp. There is no record of his registration with the Guild of St Luke of Antwerp or other information regarding his artistic formation. He is believed to have been active in Antwerp where a son Jan was born in 1695 and another son Josef Frans in 1702. His sons trained initially with him and became painters in their own right. They may have worked in his workshop.

He must have left Antwerp for the Dutch Republic as on 10 June 1718 he was registered as a member of the Guild of St Luke of Middelburg. He later worked in England. He then returned for a brief period to Antwerp. He later settled in Roanne where he is believed to have died between 1720 and 1740.

His sons both settled abroad, Jan in Paris and Josef Frans in London. Josef Frans was the father of the famous English sculptor Joseph Nollekens.

== Work ==
Jan Baptist Nollekens is mainly known for his genre scenes of peasants in interiors and merry companies. He showed the peasants in taverns, kitchen interiors, barns or outside. The peasants are depicted playing cards, drinking, smoking and engaged in courtship or conversation, He also painted an Artist and patrons in a studio. His genre paintings appear influenced by those of Adriaen Brouwer and David Teniers the Younger.

To Jan Baptist Nollekens have also been attributed a number of hunting pieces, i.e. still lifes depicting hounds with dead game in wooded landscapes. These works are close to the works of Adriaen de Grijef and Jan Fyt.

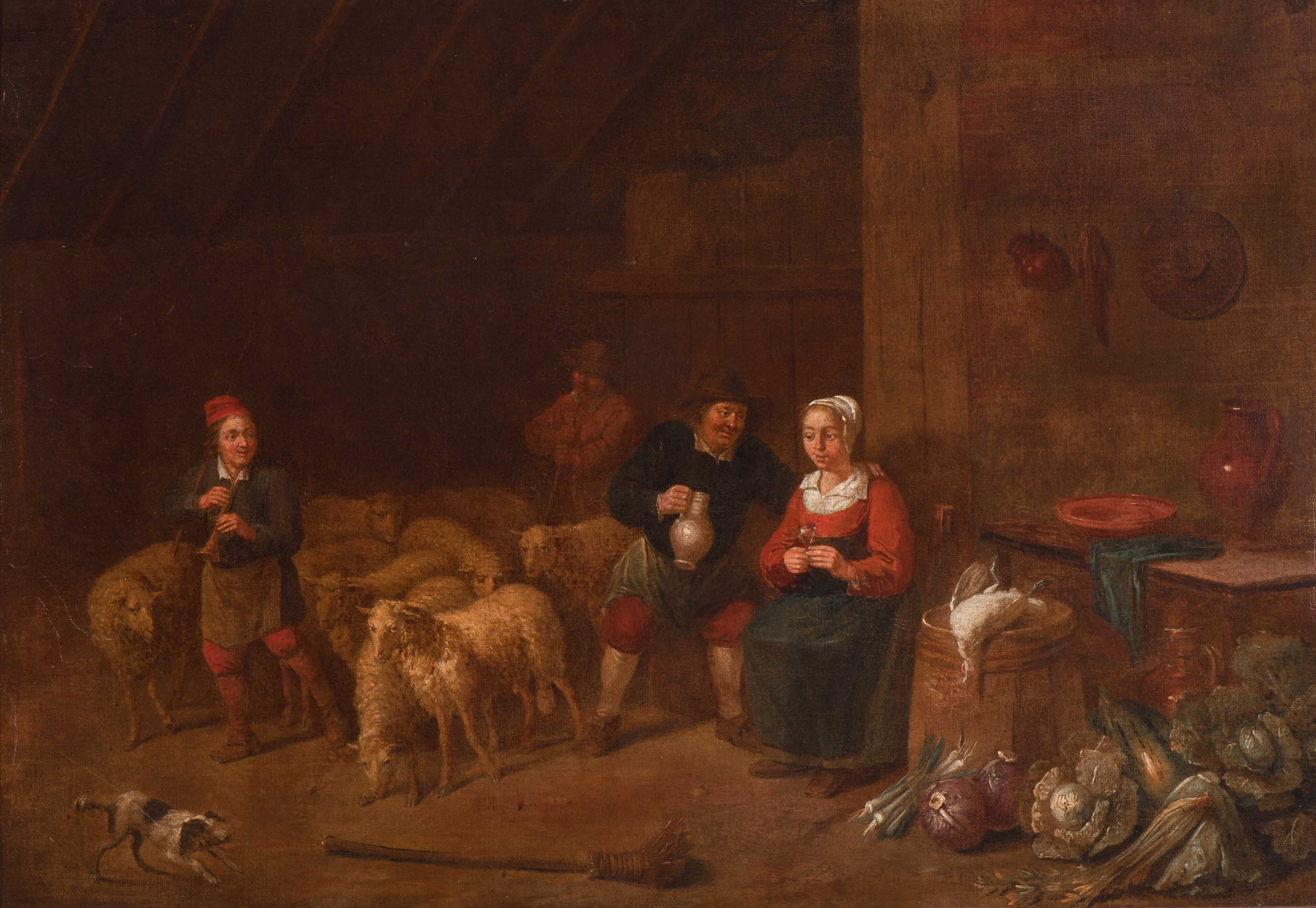
Merry company of peasants in the stable

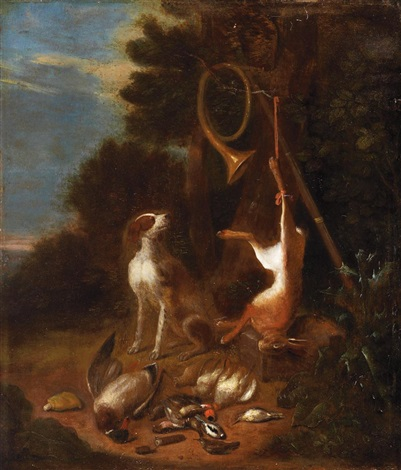
Hounds and hunting game in a wooded landscape

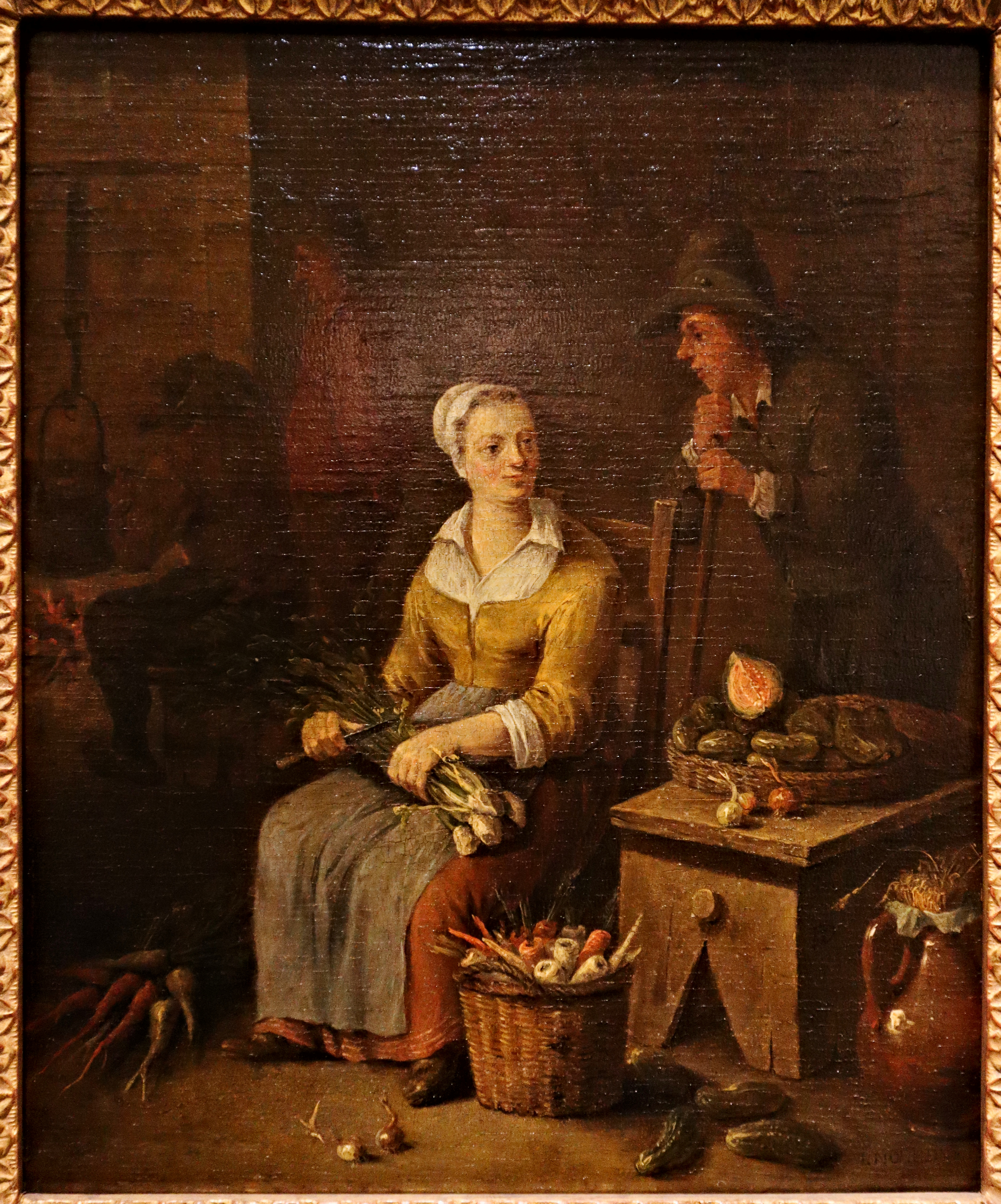
Kitchen interior
