= Bust (sculpture) =

Sculpture of a person's head and shoulders

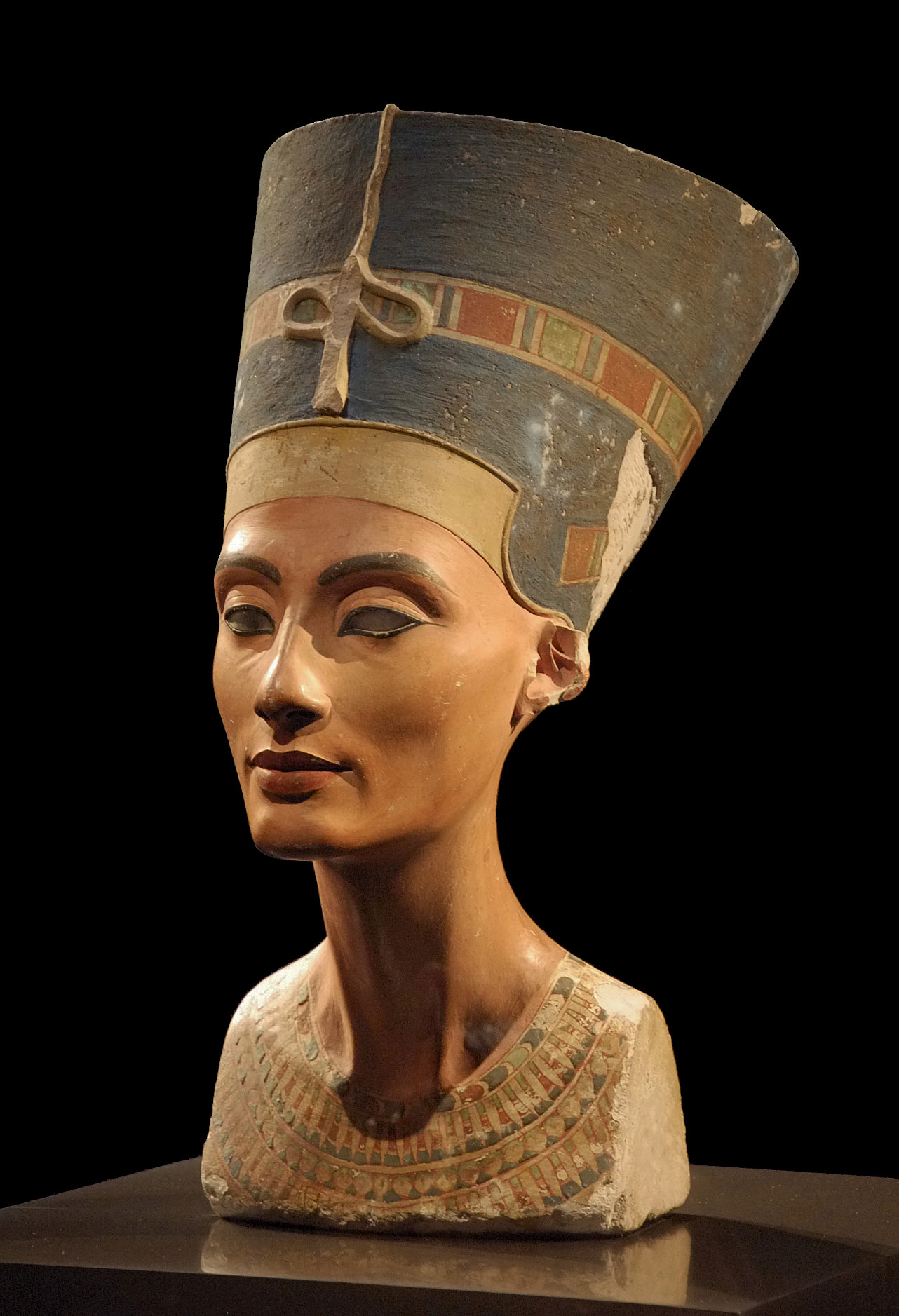
The Nefertiti Bust of Ancient Egypt

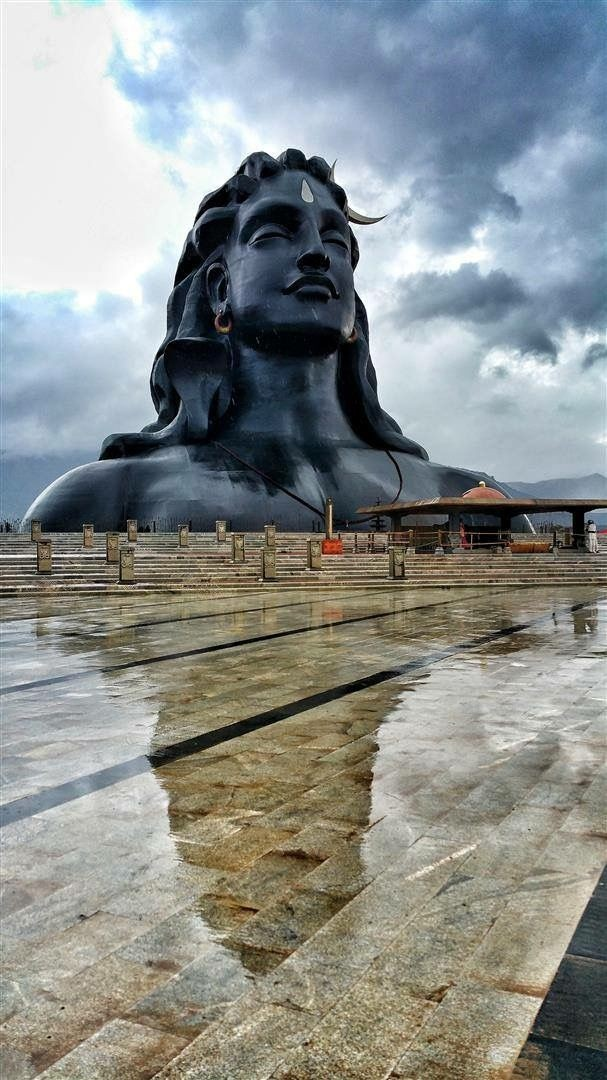
The colossal Adiyogi Shiva bust in Coimbatore, India

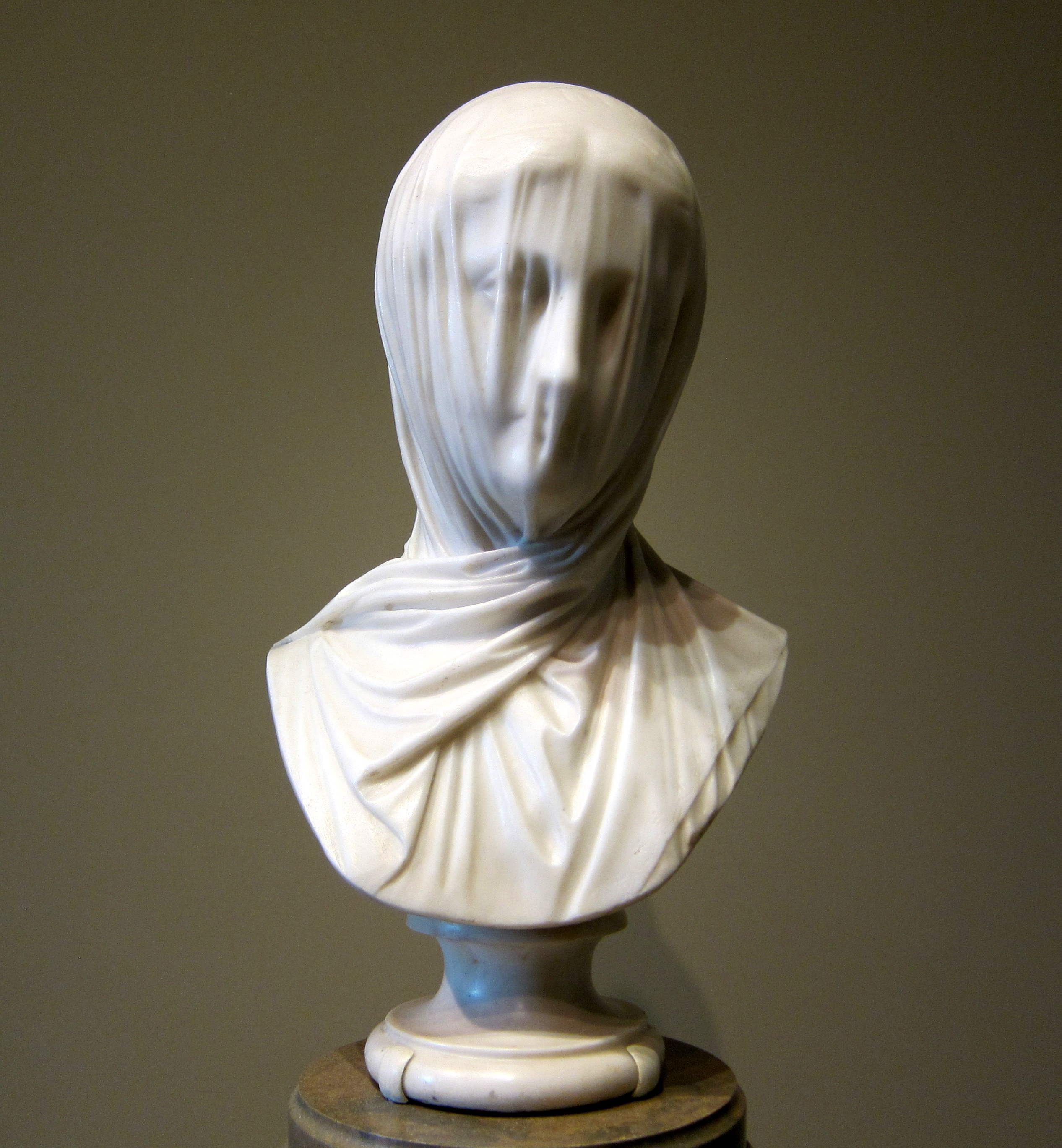
The Veiled Nun by an unknown Italian workshop

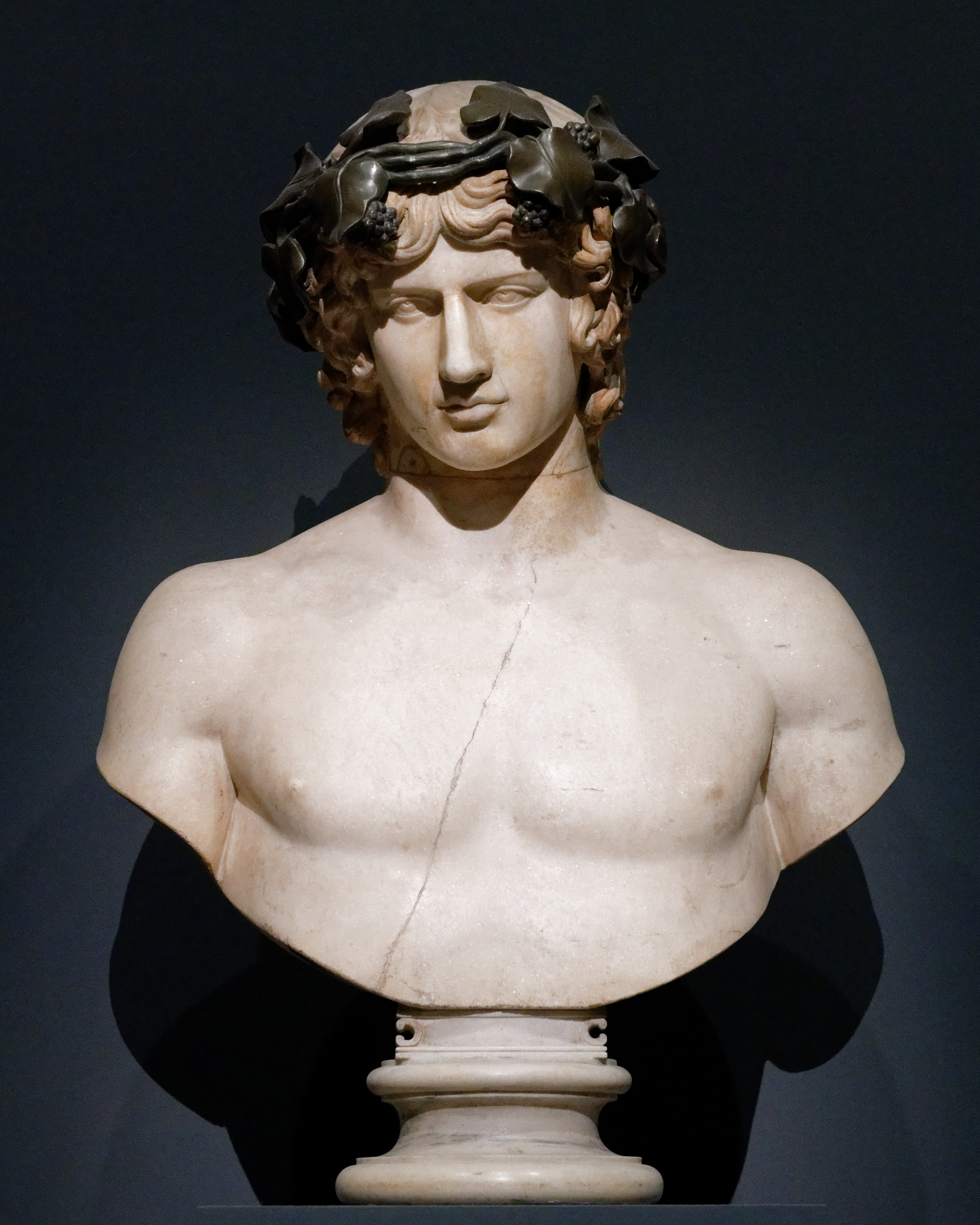
The bust of Antinous-Dionysus in the Hermitage

A bust is a sculpted or cast representation of the upper part of the human body, depicting a person's head and neck, and a variable portion of the chest and shoulders. The piece is normally supported by a plinth. The bust is generally a portrait intended to record the appearance of an individual, but may sometimes represent a type. They may be of any medium used for sculpture, such as marble, bronze, terracotta, plaster, wax or wood.

As a format that allows the most distinctive characteristics of an individual to be depicted with much less work, and therefore expense, and occupying far less space than a full-length statue, the bust has been since ancient times a popular style of life-size portrait sculpture.

A sculpture that only includes the head, perhaps with the neck, is more strictly called a "head", but this distinction is not always observed. Display often involves an integral or separate display stand. The Adiyogi Shiva statue located in India and representative of Hindu god Shiva is the world's largest bust sculpture and is 112 feet (34 m) tall.

== History ==
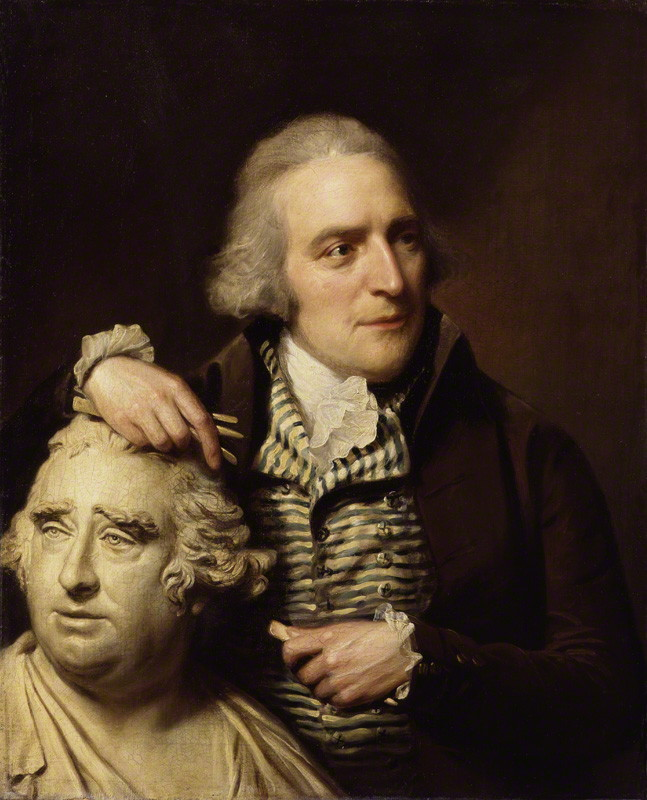
Portrait of Joseph Nollekens by Lemuel Francis Abbott, 1797. It depicts one of the leading Neoclassical sculptors with one of his best known busts.

=== Antiquity ===
Sculptural portrait heads from classical antiquity, stopping at the neck, are sometimes displayed as busts. However, these are often fragments from full-body statues, or were created to be inserted into an existing body, a common Roman practice; these portrait heads are not included in this article. Equally, sculpted heads stopping at the neck are sometimes mistakenly called busts.

The portrait bust was a Hellenistic Greek invention (although the Egyptian bust presented below precedes Hellenic productions by five centuries), though very few original Greek examples survive, as opposed to many Roman copies of them. There are four Roman copies as busts of Pericles with the Corinthian helmet, but the Greek original was a full-length bronze statue. They were very popular in Roman portraiture.

The Roman tradition may have originated in the tradition of Roman patrician families keeping wax masks, perhaps death masks, of dead members, in the atrium of the family house. When another family member died, these were worn by people chosen for the appropriate build in procession at the funeral, in front of the propped-up body of the deceased, as an "astonished" Polybius reported, from his long stay in Rome beginning in 167 BC. Later these seem to have been replaced or supplemented by sculptures. Possession of such imagines maiorum ("portraits of the ancestors") was a requirement for belonging to the Equestrian order.

=== Middle Ages ===
Some reliquaries were formed as busts, notably the famous Bust of Charlemagne in gold, still in the Aachen Cathedral treasury, from c. 1350. Otherwise it was a rare format.

=== Renaissance ===
Busts began to be revived in a variety of materials, including painted terracotta or wood, and marble. Initially most were flat-bottomed, stopping slightly below the shoulders. Francesco Laurana, born in Dalmatia, but who worked in Italy and France, specialized in marble busts, mostly of women.

=== Baroque ===
Under the Baroque school the round-bottomed Roman style, including, or designed to be placed on, a socle (a short plinth or pedestal), became most common. Gian Lorenzo Bernini, based in Rome, did portrait busts of popes, cardinals, and foreign monarchs such as Louis XIV. His Bust of King Charles I of England (1638) is now lost; artist and subject never met, and Bernini worked from the triple portrait painted by Van Dyck, which was sent to Rome. Nearly 30 years later, his Bust of the young Louis XIV was hugely influential on French sculptors. Bernini's rival Alessandro Algardi was another leading sculptor in Rome.

=== Neoclassical ===
Portrait busts remained a standard form of sculptural portraiture in the late eighteenth and early nineteenth centuries. Jean-Antoine Houdon produced many examples, including busts of Voltaire (of whom his studio issued dozens), Benjamin Franklin, and George Washington. In Britain, Joseph Nollekens, who spent eight years in Rome, was a prolific sculptor of portrait busts and ran a thriving London workshop, often working in a classical style with loose drapery. Antonio Canova, considered the greatest Neoclassical sculptor of the period, derived a widely reproduced bust of Napoleon from his colossal full-length statue of the emperor.

=== 19th century ===
In the nineteenth century busts continued to be made as independent works, sometimes derived from larger monuments, and popular models were issued in editions. Jean-Baptiste Carpeaux's marble bust Why Born Enslaved! (modeled 1868, carved 1873) was also reproduced in plaster and terracotta as a commercial edition. Auguste Rodin exhibited as an independent work a bust derived from his full-length Saint John the Baptist Preaching, and he modeled portrait busts including an early study of Honoré de Balzac for a commemorative monument. Historically the portrait bust remained a means of commemorating an individual.

=== Modern and contemporary ===
Hoodie Bust by Mark Jenkins

In the early twentieth century artists also used the bust for formal experiment. Between 1910 and 1916 Henri Matisse made five busts of Jeanne Vaderin, known as the Jeannette series: the first two were modeled from the sitter, and later versions became increasingly abstract. After the Second World War, Alberto Giacometti made emaciated busts of his brother Diego, including the bronze Bust of Diego (1955). More traditional portrait busts continued to be produced, such as Elisabeth Frink's bronze bust of Alec Guinness (1984); later artists also revisited earlier models, as in Kehinde Wiley's After La Négresse, 1872 (2007), an editioned sculpture made in reference to a terracotta bust of Carpeaux's Why Born Enslaved!.

== See also ==
- Herma
- Portrait
