= Josef Frans Nollekens =

Flemish painter

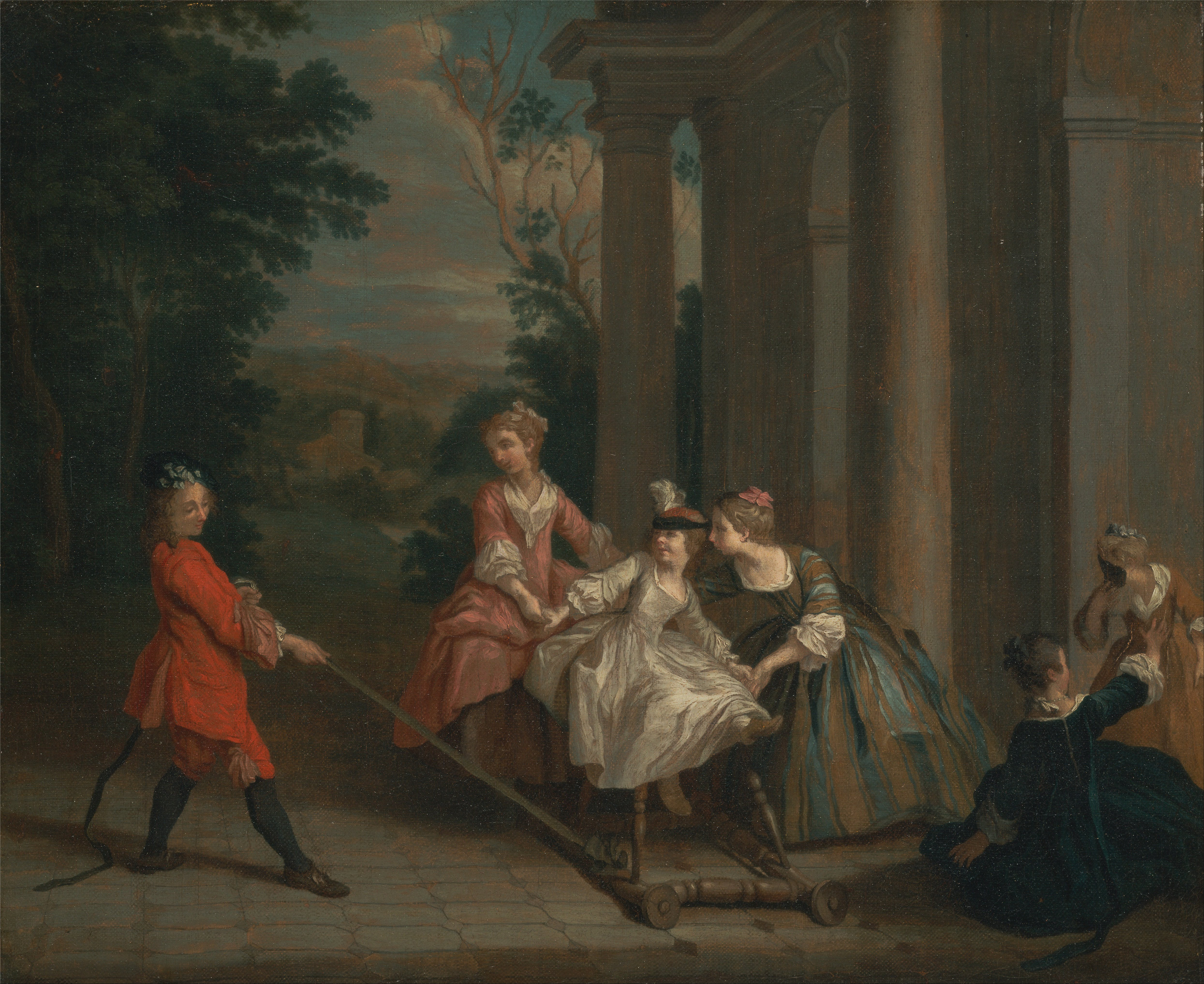
Youngsters Playing with a Hobby Horse

Josef Frans Nollekens or Joseph Frans Nollekens (1702–1748) was a Flemish painter who was principally active in England where he is often referred to as "Old Nollekens" to distinguish him from his famous son, the sculptor Joseph Nollekens. He painted conversation pieces, galant companies and fêtes champêtres in the style of Watteau, genre scenes as well as portraits. He was also active as a picture restorer.

== Life ==
He was born in Antwerp, the son of Jan Baptist Nollekens, a genre and still life painter from Antwerp who had practised for a while in the Dutch Republic and England, and eventually settled in Roanne in France. He started his art studies under his father Jan Baptist while he was living in Roanne. Some older sources claim that he also studied under Antoine Watteau. There is no evidence for such training. It is now believed that it is more likely that during his stay in France he made copies after Watteau which explains why his own works are similar in style and subject matter to those of Watteau. While visiting England after 1718, he studied under and worked with the Flemish landscape painter Peter Tillemans who resided in England.

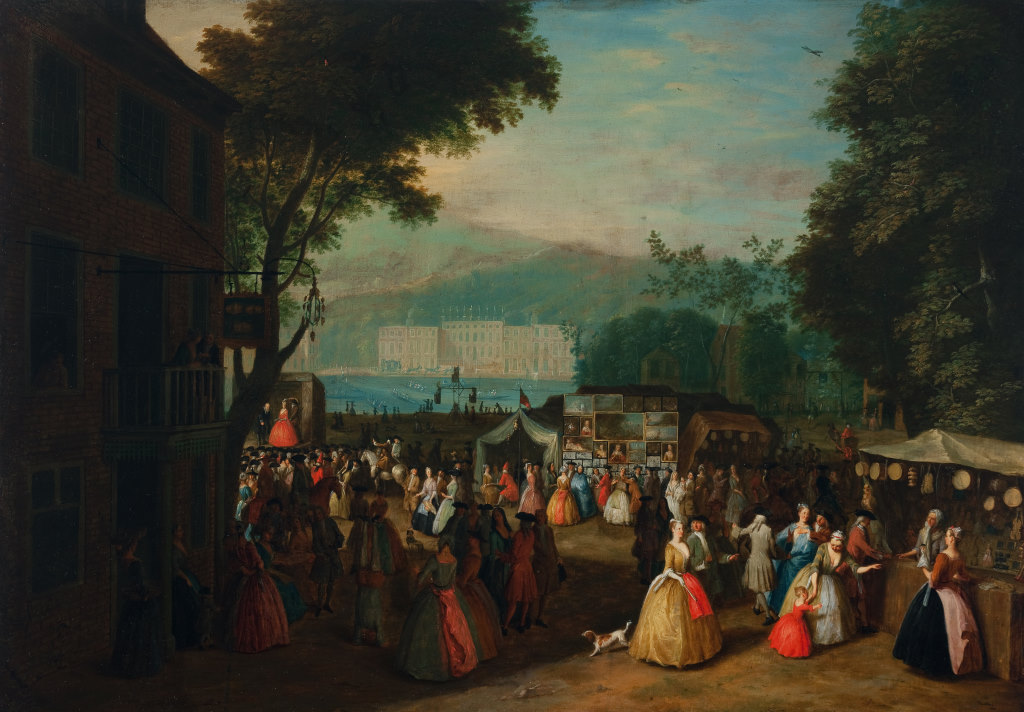
At the Fair

In 1733 he returned to England where he settled. He married Mary Anne Le Sacq or Lesack on 3 May 1733. As they were Catholics, the wedding took place at the Sardinian embassy while their children were baptised at the chapel of the Venetian ambassador: John Joseph in 1735, Joseph in 1737, Maria Joanna Sophia in 1739, James 1741 and Thomas Charles in 1745. Joseph Nollekens became one of the most famous sculptors in England.

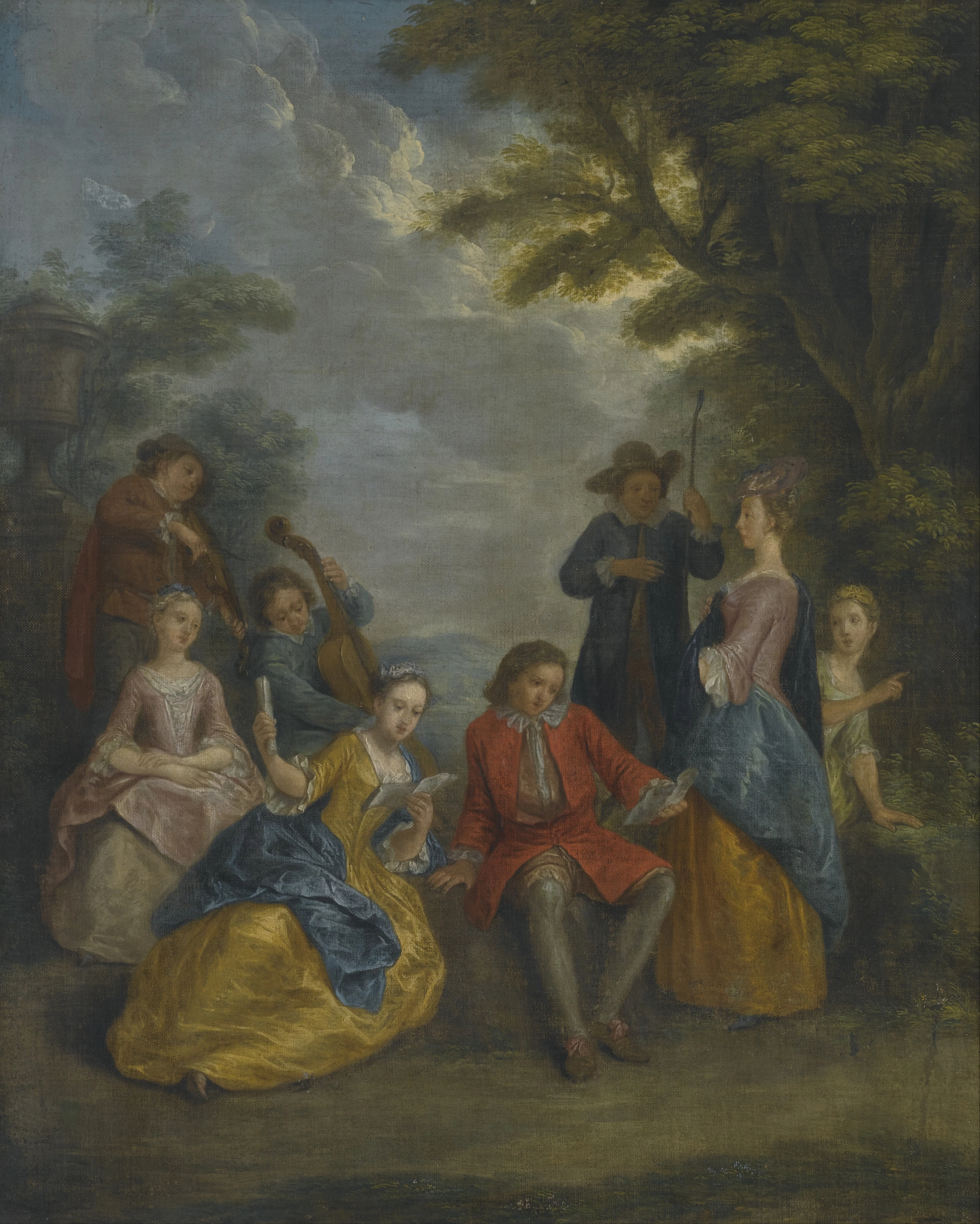
Fête Champêtre

In England he began to paint conversation pieces. Nollekens found a major patron in Richard Child, 1st Earl Tylney, for whom he painted conversation pieces, fêtes champêtres, and similar works, usually set in the gardens of Wanstead House. Several of these were included in the sale held at Wanstead in 1822, one, an Interior of the Saloon at Wanstead, with an assemblage of ladies and gentlemen, fetching a high price for the time. This work may be identical with the Family Group in a Palladian Interior in the collection of Fairfax House, York. There was reportedly a picture by him with portraits of Frederick, Prince of Wales and his sisters at Windsor Castle. He also carried out decorative works at Stowe House for Lord Cobham, and painted pictures for the Marquess of Stafford at Trentham Hall. In 1742, he submitted a bill for cleaning and mending pictures for the Howard family.

Nollekens lived in Dean St, near Soho Square, from 1737 to 1748. On 21 January 1748, he died at this house and was buried at Paddington. His collection of prints, books of prints and drawings was sold in London in 1751. According to a contemporary story of Thomas Banks, he was a miser and had a pathological fear of being robbed of property, exacerbated by anxiety that he would be persecuted for being a Catholic.

== Works ==
He painted principally conversation pieces and galant companies in the style of Watteau, genre scenes as well as portraits. The term conversation piece is used to refer to an informal group portrait, especially those painted in Britain in the 18th century, beginning in the 1720s. They are distinguished by their portrayal of a group of people engaged in genteel conversation or some other activity, very often outdoors. The conversation piece was fashionable in England around 1725 by Philippe Mercier, an imitator of Watteau. It was quickly converted into an English idiom by Bartholomew Dandridge and William Hogarth.

When first in England, Nollekens worked on making copies after Watteau and Giovanni Paolo Panini. His works sometimes include picturesque ruins in the manner of Panini.
