= John O'London's Weekly =

UK literary magazine

- Categories: Literary magazines
- Frequency: Weekly
- First issue: April 1919
- Final issue: September 1954
- Company: George Newnes Ltd
- Country: United Kingdom
- Based in: London
- Language: English

John O'London's Weekly was a weekly literary magazine that was published by George Newnes Ltd of London between 1919 and 1954. In 1960 it was briefly brought back into circulation (writer Peter Green's biography lists him as having been film critic at John O'London's between 1961 and 1963). Regarded as the leading literary magazine in the British Empire, at its height it had a circulation of 80,000, and it was popular among young and older readers alike.

Founded in April 1919, John O'London's Weekly took its title from the pen name of one of its early editors, Wilfred Whitten, and its content featured contributions from the best known literary names of the day as well as from newer less well known writers. Regular contributors included Robert Wilson Lynd, Winston Churchill, Rebecca West, H. E. Bates, Arnold Bennett, Max Beerbohm, John Brophy, W. Somerset Maugham and H. L. A. Hart.

The magazine regularly featured a literate section on English grammar and word usage, and would recommend carefully selected good books.

Although John O'London's Weekly was very popular during the inter-war years, the outbreak of the Second World War had a dramatic impact on its circulation. Sales were reduced due to newsprint regulations and as many of its readers joined the services. High costs and changing tastes meant that sales did not recover after the war, and in September 1954 the magazine's publishers announced that publication would cease.

== References in popular culture ==
John O'London's Weekly appears in Frank McCourt's 1996 memoir Angela's Ashes. While McCourt is delivering magazines to shops for the company Eason's, his boss learns from the Irish government that copies of John O'London's Weekly must be censored because they contain an article about birth control. McCourt tells of how he and his boss visit newsagents around Limerick to tear pages from copies of the magazine, much to the disdain of the shop owners.
