= Portrait of Joseph Nollekens (Beechey) =

Painting by William Beechey

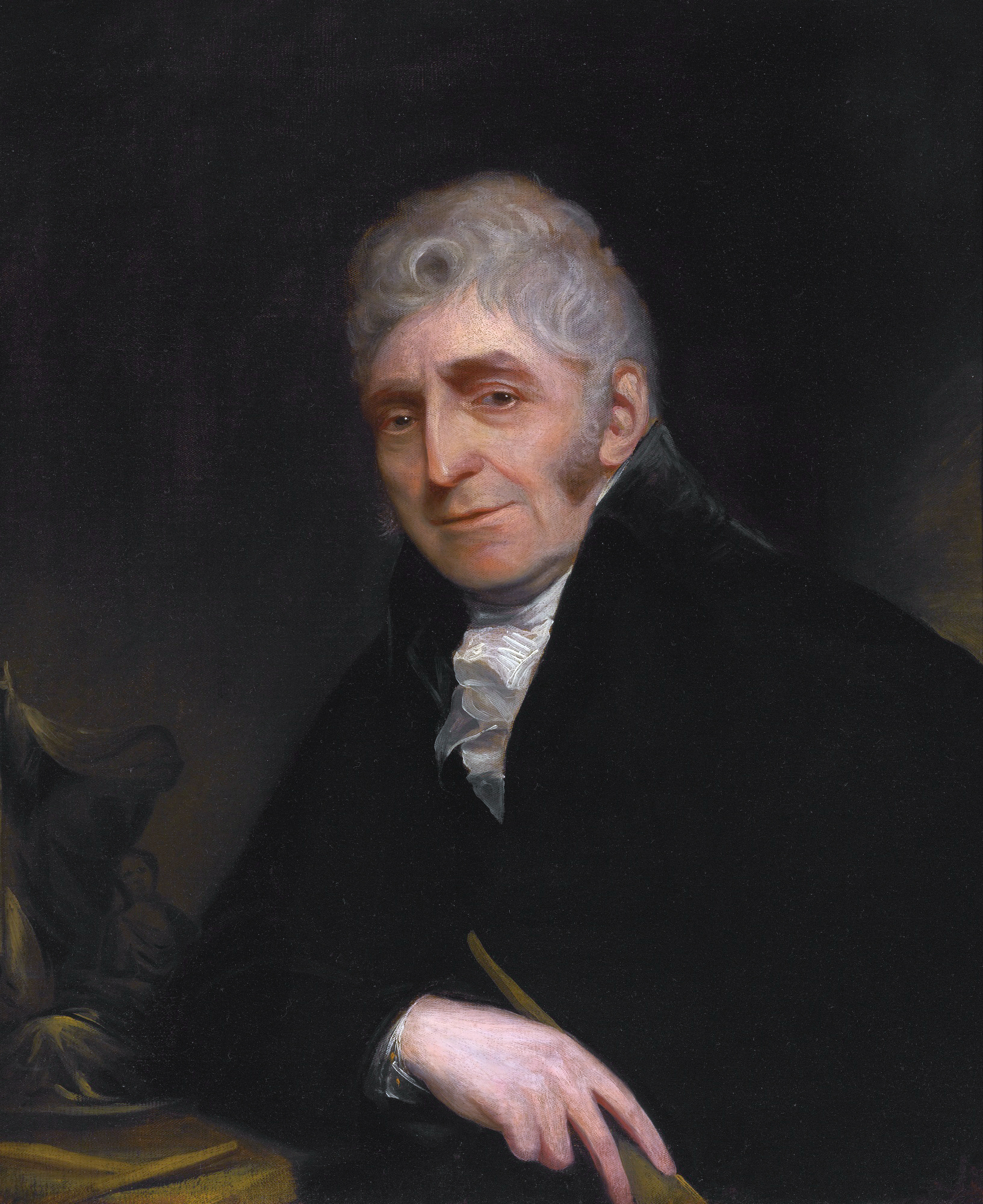
- Artist: William Beechey
- Year: 1812
- Type: Oil on canvas, portrait painting
- Dimensions: 76.2 cm × 63.5 cm (30.0 in × 25.0 in)
- Location: Tate Britain; London

Portrait of Joseph Nollekens is an 1812 portrait painting by the British artist William Beechey. It depicts the celebrated sculptor Joseph Nollekens in a head-and-shoulders composition. Nollekens was an old friend of Beechey, both prominent members of the Royal Academy during the Regency era.

The painting was displayed at the Royal Academy Exhibition of 1812 at Somerset House. It was presented to the National Gallery in 1835, and is now in the collection of the Tate Britain in Pimlico. In 1814 the engraver Charles Turner produced a mezzotint based on Beechey's painting.

== See also ==
- Portrait of Joseph Nollekens (Abbott), a 1797 painting by Lemuel Francis Abbott

== Bibliography ==
- Baetjer, Katharine. British Paintings in the Metropolitan Museum of Art, 1575-1875. Metropolitan Museum of Art, 2009.
- Roberts, William. William Beechey. Duckworth and Company, 1907.
