= Joseph Nollekens =

18th-century British sculptor

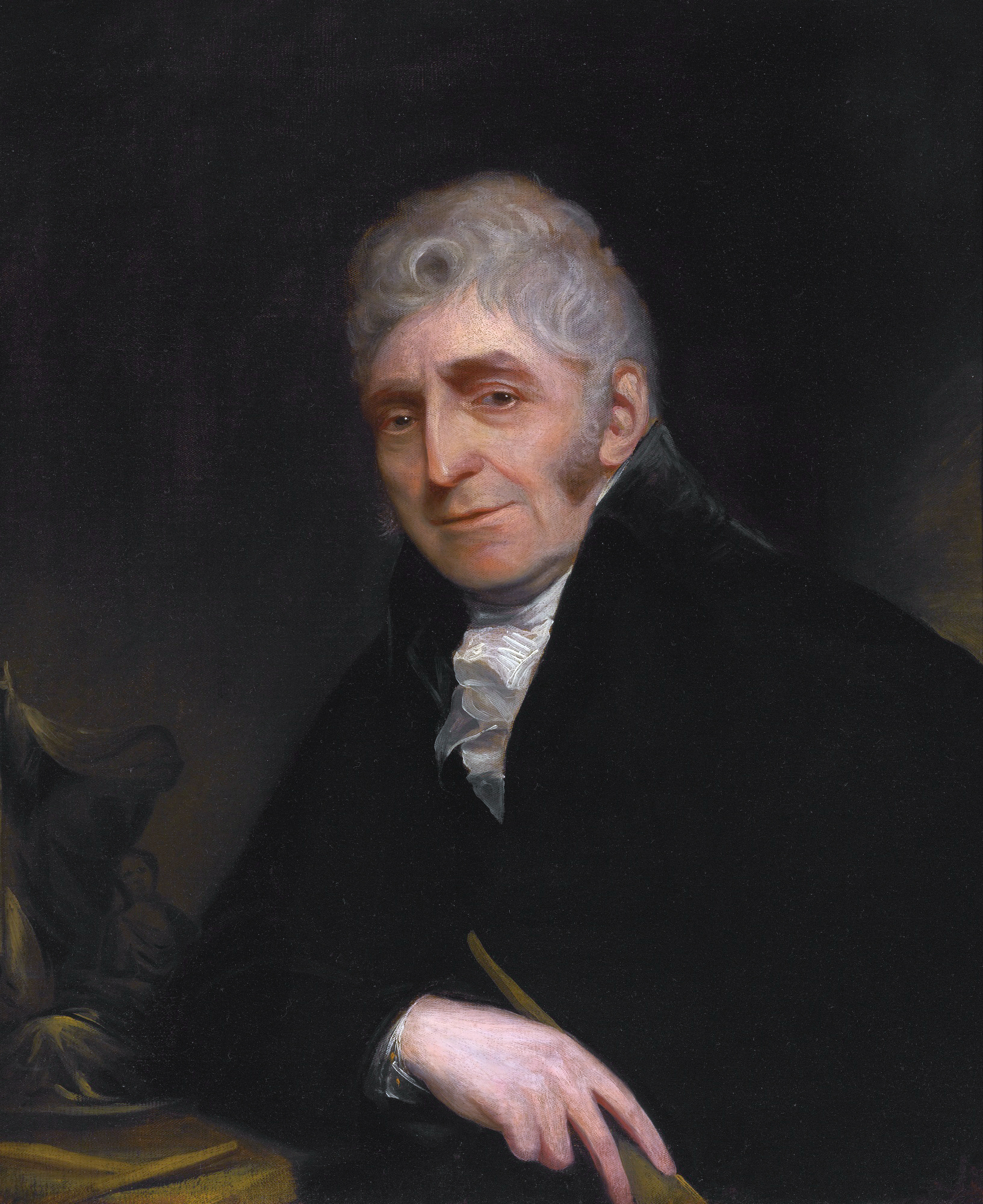
- Portrait of Joseph Nollekens by William Beechey, 1812
- Born: 11 August 1737; Soho, London
- Died: 23 April 1823 (aged 85)
- Occupation: British sculptor

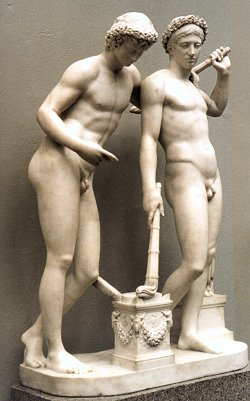
Castor and Pollux; copy of an antique statue by Joseph Nollekens, Victoria and Albert Museum

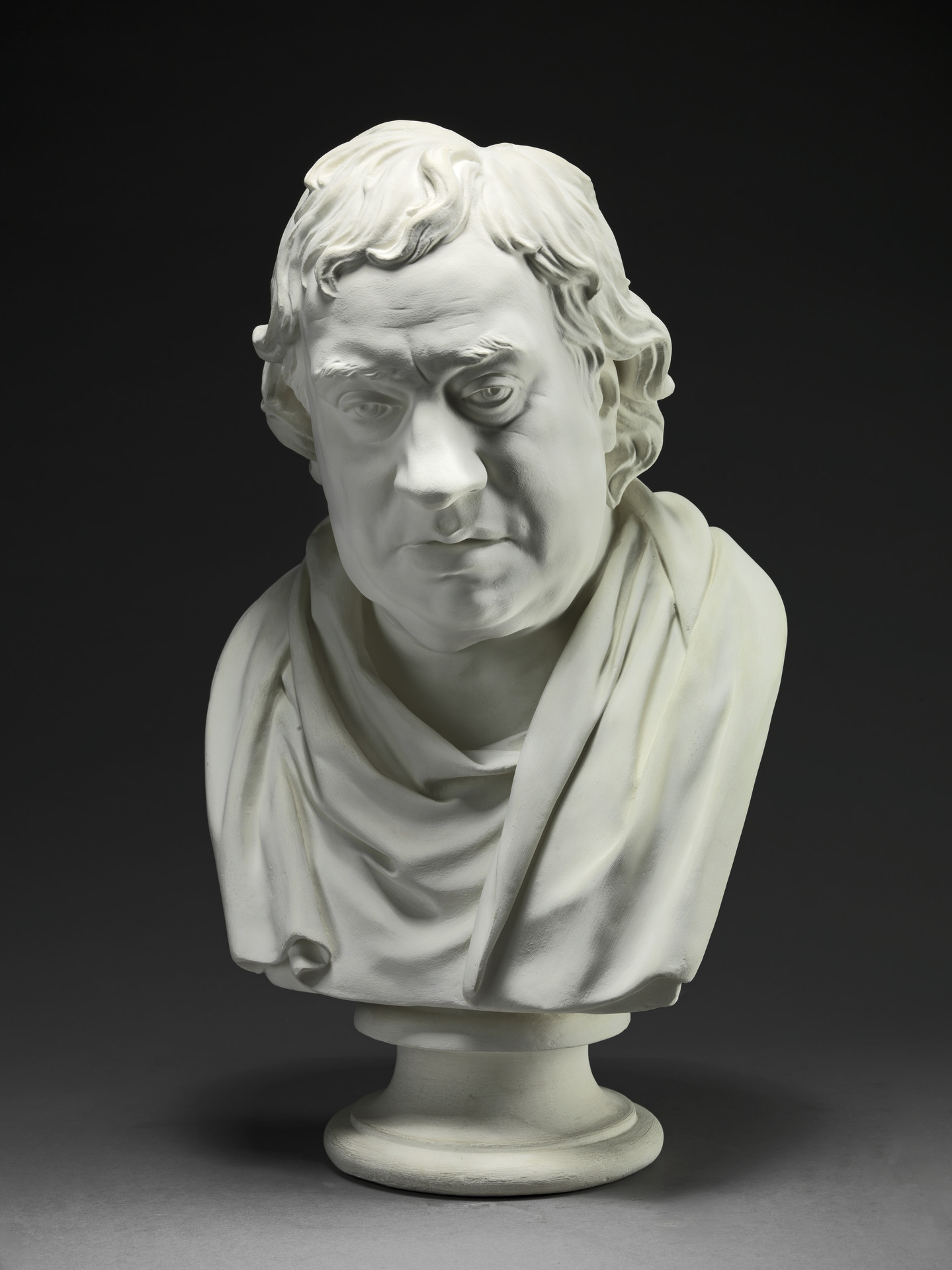
Samuel Johnson, plaster, by Joseph Nollekens, Yale Center for British Art, 1777.

Joseph Nollekens R.A. (11 August 1737 – 23 April 1823) was a sculptor from London generally considered to be the finest British sculptor of the late 18th century.

== Life ==
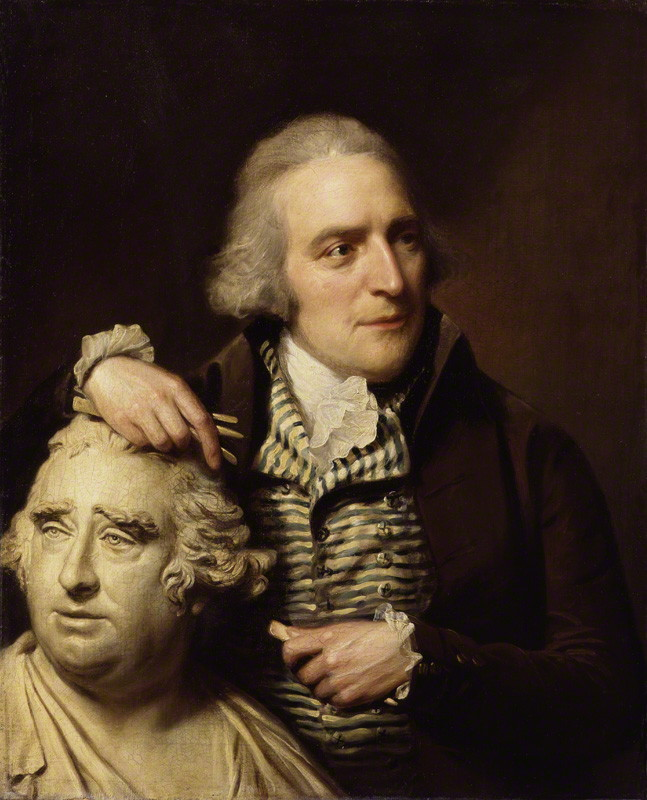
Portrait of Joseph Nollekens by Lemuel Francis Abbott, 1797. Nollekens is shown with his bust of Charles James Fox

Nollekens was born on 11 August 1737 at 28 Dean Street, Soho, London, the son of the Flemish painter Josef Frans Nollekens (1702–1748) who had moved from Antwerp to London in 1733. He studied first under another Flemish immigrant in London, the sculptor Peter Scheemakers, before studying and working as an antiques dealer, restorer and copier in Rome from 1760 or 1762. The sculptures he made in Rome included a marble of Timocles Before Alexander, for which he was awarded fifty guineas by the Society of Arts, and busts of Laurence Sterne and David Garrick, who were visiting the city.

On his return to London in 1770 he set up as a maker of busts and monuments at 9, Mortimer Street, where he built up a large practice. Although he preferred working on mythological subjects, it was through his portrait busts that he became famous and one of the most fashionable portrait sculptors in Britain. In 1772 he married Mary, daughter of the judge and grocer Saunders Welch.

He enjoyed the patronage of King George III and went on to sculpt a number of British political figures, including George III himself, William Pitt the Younger, Charles James Fox, the Duke of Bedford and Charles Watson-Wentworth. He also made busts of figures from the arts such as Benjamin West. Most of his subjects were represented in classical costume.

Faith, a sculpture commissioned by Henry Howard following the death of his wife Maria in 1788 in childbirth at Corby Castle, is said to be Nollekens' finest work. The sculpture can be seen in the Howard Chapel at the Parish Church of Wetheral, Cumbria. When he heard where the monument was to be placed he cried because he feared so few people would see it.<https://www.lakesguides.co.uk/html/lgaz/LK40210.htm>

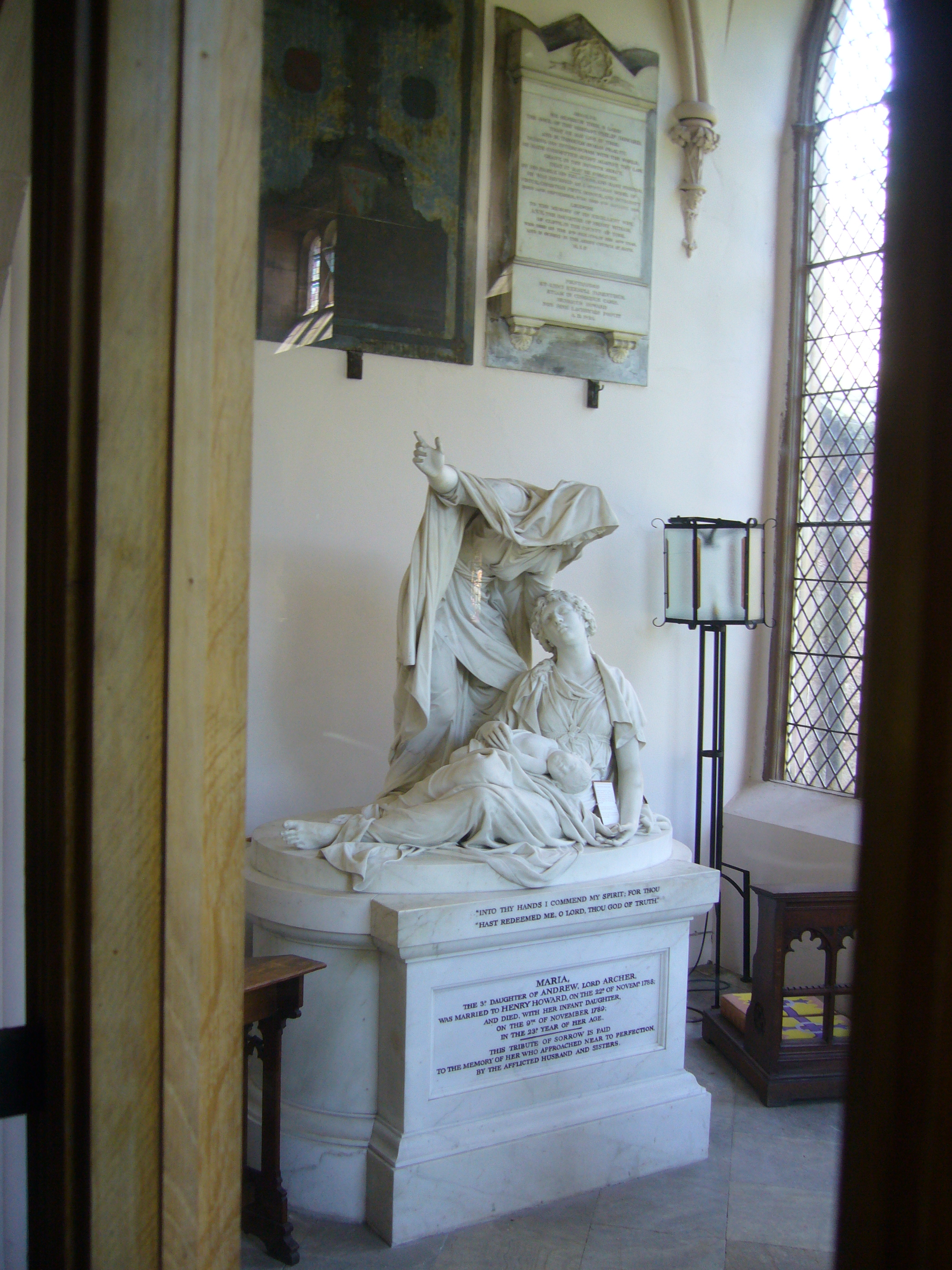
Faith in Wetheral Parish Church, Cumbria. Commissioned by Henry Howard after the death of his wife Maria in 1788.

Although he took great care over the modelling of the details of his sculptures, the marble versions were normally made by assistants, such as Sebastian Gahagan who carved Nollekens' statue of William Pitt for the Senate House, Cambridge, and L. Alexander Goblet. Some subjects were produced in large numbers: more than 70 replicas of Nollekens' bust of Pitt are known.

Nollekens became an associate of the Royal Academy in 1771 and a full academician the following year.

Painted around that time, his portrait by the celebrated artist Mary Moser now hangs in the Yale Center for British Art.

== Death ==
He died in London in 1823, having made a considerable fortune from his work; he left around £200,000 in his will. He is buried in St James's Church, Paddington with a monument by William Behnes.

A biography Nollekens and his Times by his executor John Thomas Smith was published in 1828, portraying him as a grotesque miser. It has been described as "perhaps the most candid biography ever published in the English language." It has been suggested he was the model for the miser Briggs in Cecilia. His collection of prints and drawings, including 'a matchless collection of the works of Sir Joshua Reynolds', was sold at auction by R. H. Evans on 4 December 1823. A copy of the catalogue, priced and with buyers' names, is at Cambridge University Library (shelfmark Munby.c.126(14)).

No. 44 Mortimer Street in Fitzrovia stands on the site of the house where Nollekens died and has a blue plaque commemorating him.

American poet Randall Jarrell commemorated Nollekens in his poem entitled "Nollekens", collected in his 1956 volume Selected Poems.

== List of works ==
- Bust of Samuel Johnson, Yale Center for British Art, New Haven, Connecticut
- Faith, St. Constantine's Church, Wetheral, Cumbria
- Castor and Pollux, Victoria and Albert Museum, Kensington, Greater London
- Memorial to William Windham, St. Margaret's Church, Felbrigg, Norfolk
- Bust of Charles James Fox, Hunterian Museum, University of Glasgow , marble 1796
- Bust of Primate Robinson, St Patrick’s Cathedral, Armagh
- Bust of Lady Maria Stella Newburg, Comtesse von Ungern-Sternberg, Nationalmuseum, Stockholm

== Sources ==
- Whinney, Margaret (1971). English Sculpture 1720–1830 (Victoria and Albert Museum Monograph). London: HMSO. ISBN 978-0-11-290083-2.

== Bibliography ==
- Smith, John Thomas, 1766–1833; Whitten, Wilfred, 1864–1942 (1917). Nollekens and his times : and memoirs of contemporary artists from the time of Roubiliac, Hogarth and Reynolds to that of Fuseli, Flaxman and Blake. Vol. 1.
- Smith, John Thomas, 1766–1833; Whitten, Wilfred, 1864–1942 (1917). Nollekens and his times : and memoirs of contemporary artists from the time of Roubiliac, Hogarth and Reynolds to that of Fuseli, Flaxman and Blake. Vol. 2.
