= Wilfred Whitten =

British writer (1864–1942)

Wilfred Whitten (1864–1942) was a British writer and editor. His pseudonym was "John O'London", from where the influential John O'London's Weekly obtained its name.

Whitten was assistant editor of The Academy from 1896 to 1902. He served as acting editor of T. P.'s Weekly (founded by T. P. O'Connor) from its establishment in 1902 until 1911, sharing responsibilities with J. A. T. Lloyd. Whitten worked for the Daily Mail from 1916 to 1919, when he founded John O'London's Weekly, for which he worked until 1936. Sidney Dark, who joined John O'London's Weekly, considered Whitten to be "one of the most attractive men of letters that I have ever known". He was also a good talker and a master of accuracy.

== Select bibliography ==
- The World's Library of Best Books
- Good and Bad English (1950)
- London Stories (1926)
- Daniel Defoe (1900)
- Treasure trove: being good things lost and found
- Unposted Letters Concerning Life & Literature
- Nollekens and His Times
- London in poetry and poets in London (1906)
- Quaker Pictures
- A Londoner's London (1912)
- The City Man's City (1911)
- Unfamiliar Fleet Street (1912)
