= Portrait of Joseph Nollekens (Abbott) =

Painting by Lemuel Francis Abbott

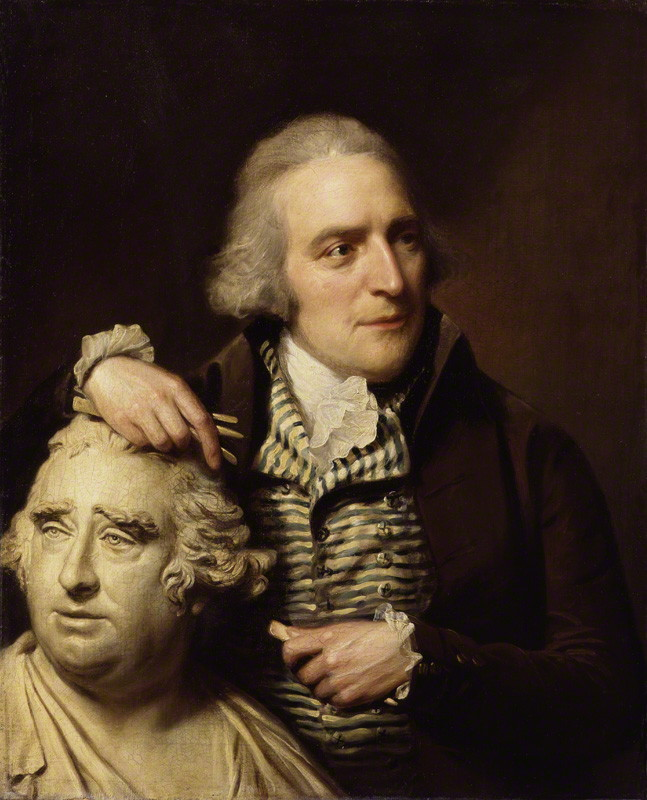
- Artist: Lemuel Francis Abbott
- Year: 1797
- Type: Oil on canvas, portrait painting
- Dimensions: 77.1 cm × 63.5 cm (30.4 in × 25.0 in)
- Location: National Portrait Gallery; London

Portrait of Joseph Nollekens is a 1797 portrait painting by the British artist Lemuel Francis Abbott. It depicts the prominent sculptor Joseph Nollekens. A key figure of the Neoclassical movement, Nollekens was best known for his bust of leading political figures, which as William Pitt and Charles James Fox which were reproduced on a masa scale. The painting makes reference to this by showing the sculptor shown resting on his well-known bust of Fox.

The painting was not exhibited in the artist's lifetime, but featured at the 1867 Exhibition of National Portraits at the Victoria and Albert Museum in South Kensington. It is today in the collection of the National Portrait Gallery in London, having been gifted by Henry Labouchere in 1858.

== See also ==
- Portrait of Joseph Nollekens, an 1812 painting by William Beechey

== Bibliography ==
- Curtis, Penelope (ed.) On the Meanings of Sculpture in Painting. Henry Moore Institute, 2009
- Walker, Richard John Boileau. Regency Portraits, Volume 1. National Portrait Gallery, 1985.
