= Lemuel Francis Abbott =

English painter (1760/61–1803)

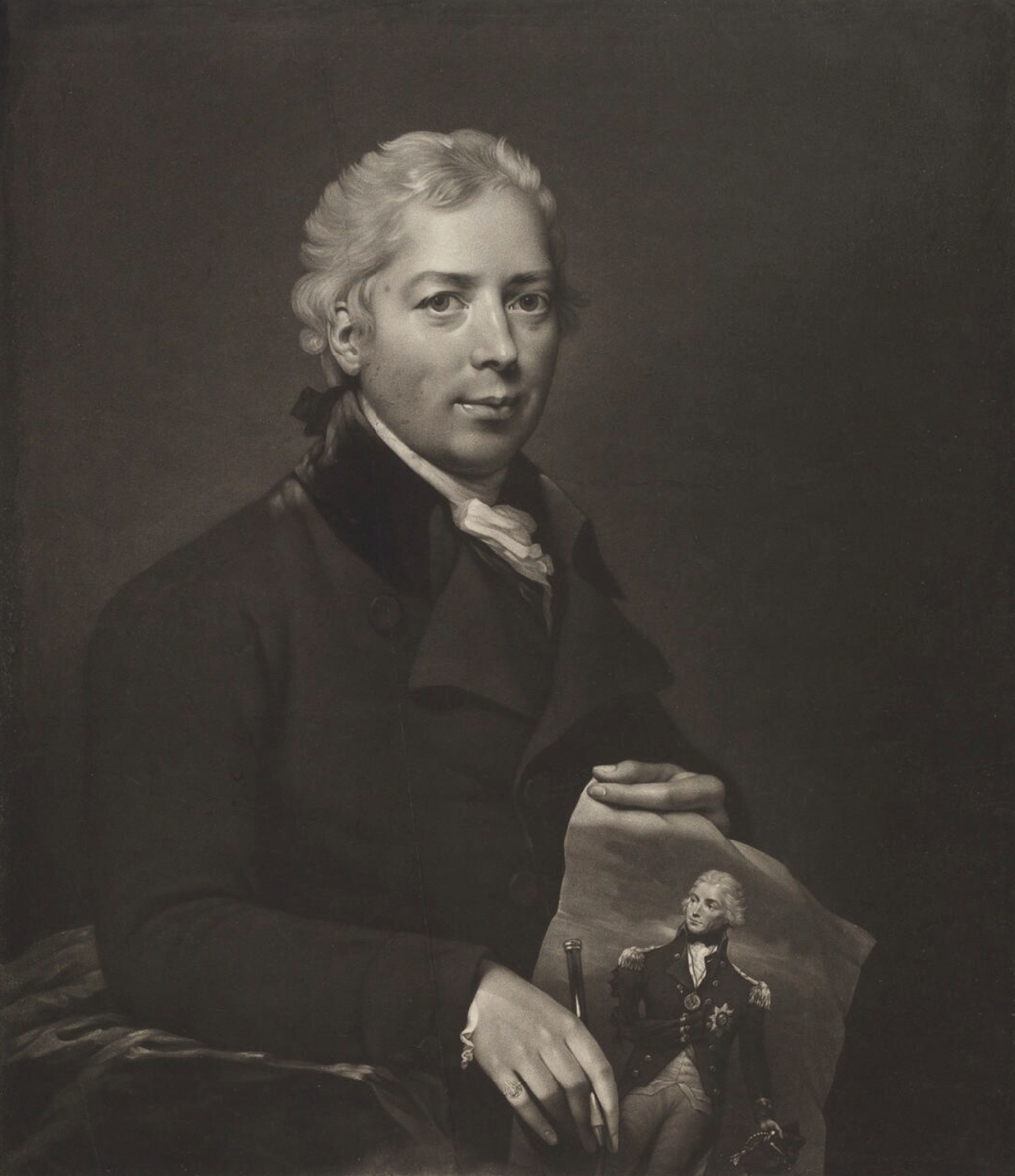
1805 engraving of Abbott by Valentine Green after a self-portrait of Abbott

Lemuel Francis Abbott (born Lemuel Abbott; 1760/61 – 5 December 1803) was an English painter who specialised in portrait painting. He is known for his portrait of Horatio Nelson, 1st Viscount Nelson and other naval officers and literary figures of the late 18th and early 19th centuries.

== Life ==
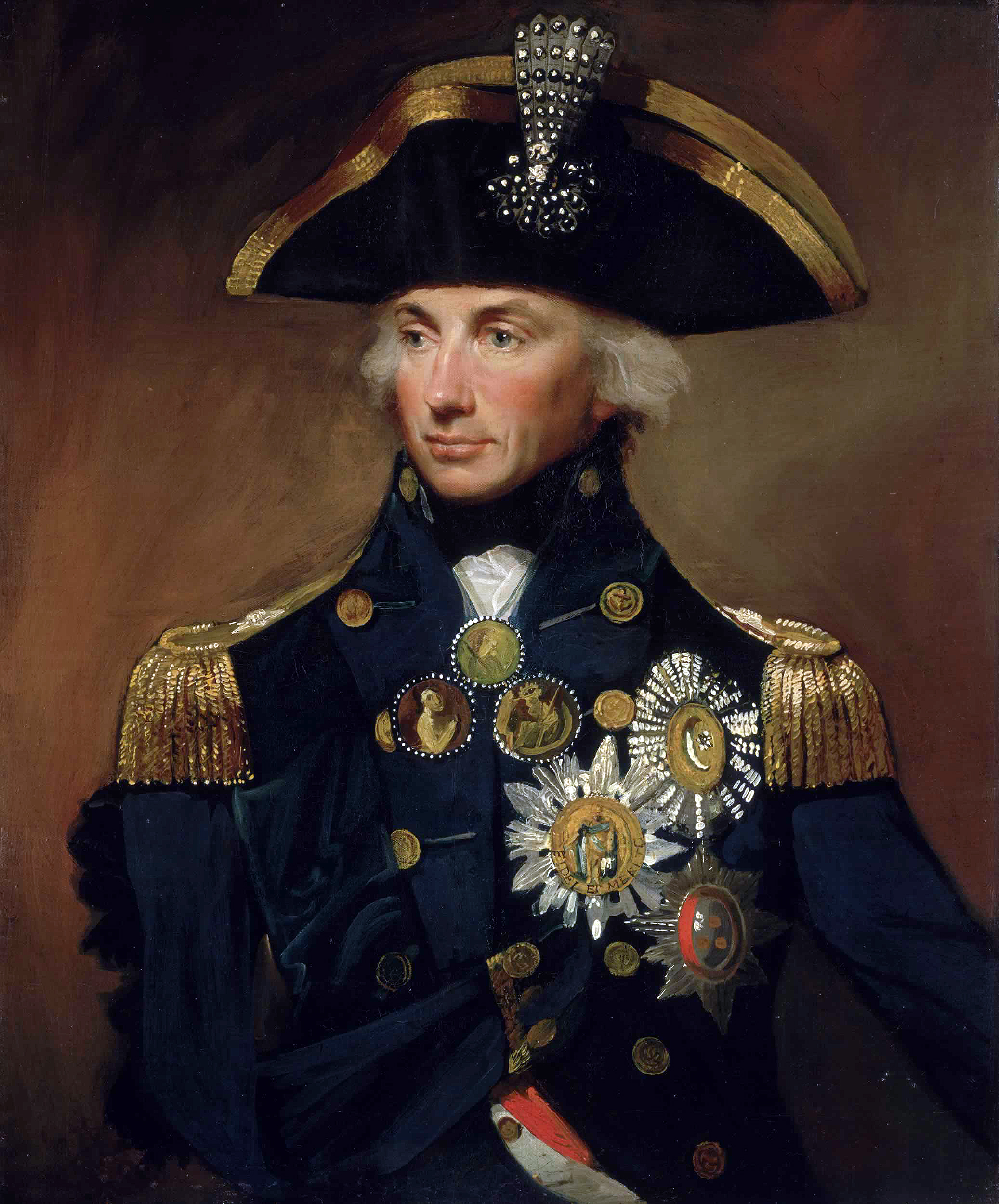
Portrait of Horatio Nelson, 1799

He was born Lemuel Abbott in Leicestershire in 1760 or 1761, the son of clergyman Lemuel Abbott, curate of Anstey (and later vicar of Thornton) and his wife Mary. In 1775, at the age of 14, he became a pupil of Francis Hayman and lived in London, but returned to his parents after his teacher's death in 1776. There he continued to develop his artistic talents independently, but some authorities have suggested that he may also have studied with Joseph Wright of Derby.

In 1780, Abbott married Anna Maria, and again settled in London, residing for many years in Caroline Street in Bloomsbury. Although he exhibited at the Royal Academy, he never became an Academician. It is said that overwork, due to the commissions he took on, and domestic unhappiness led to his becoming insane. He was declared insane in 1798, and was treated by Thomas Munro (1759–1833), the chief physician to Bethlem Hospital and a specialist in mental disorders – Munro also treated King George III (1738–1820).

Abbott died in London on 5 December 1803.

== Works ==
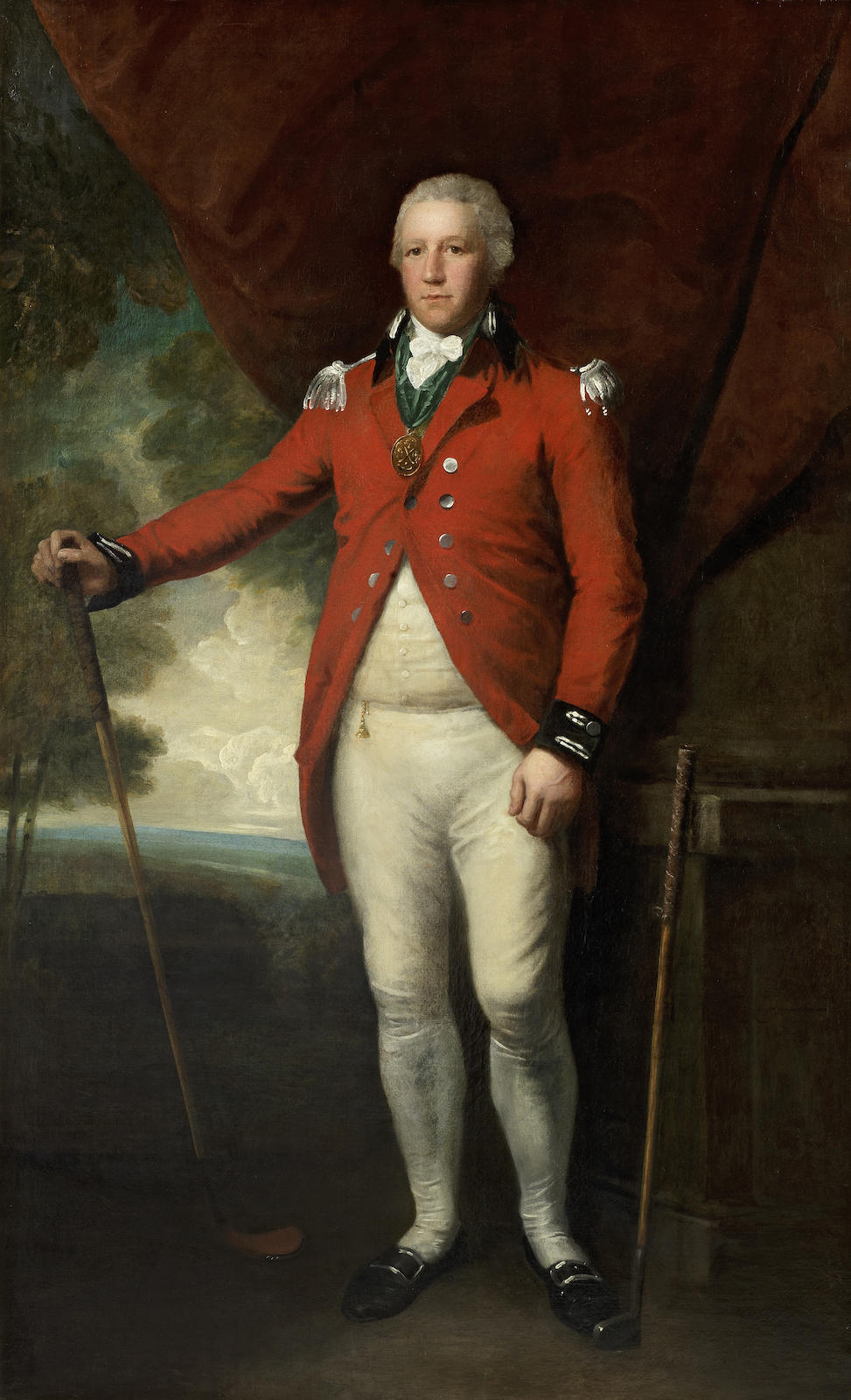
Portrait of Henry Callender standing full-length in a landscape in the attire of Captain General of the Blackheath Golf Club (1790–1798)

Abbott painted portraits of many figures of the day. His 1797 portrait of Horatio Nelson was commenced during a period where both men were living in the same lodgings in London's Bond Street. The finished work won the approval of both Nelson and his wife, with lady Nelson writing that "[T]he likeliness is great; I am well pleased with Abbott." While the Nelson portrait was Abbott's most famous work, other subjects of the period included Admiral Sir Robert Calder, Rear-Admiral Sir Thomas Pasley and Captain William Locker, astronomer Sir William Herschel, poet William Cowper, artists Francesco Bartolozzi and Joseph Nollekens, entrepreneur Matthew Boulton and industrialist John Wilkinson.

His portrait of Henry Callender, the captain general of the Blackheath Golf Club, is one of the earliest portrayals of the game of golf. Reproductions hang in golf clubs the world over. It was sold at Bonhams in London on 9 December 2015.

Some of his paintings were signed "Francis Lemuel Abbott", but it is not known why he assumed the additional Christian name, as it was not one with which he was baptised. Other famous paintings include, that off one addressed as follows: To the society of goffers at Blackheath this plate is with just respect Dedicated by their most humble servant, Lemuel Francis Abbott It is signed painted by L.F.Abbott 1790. It is reported to be that of a Captain William Innes and a pensioner. Captain Innes was as the story goes, an avid fan of the society of goffers.

== Gallery ==
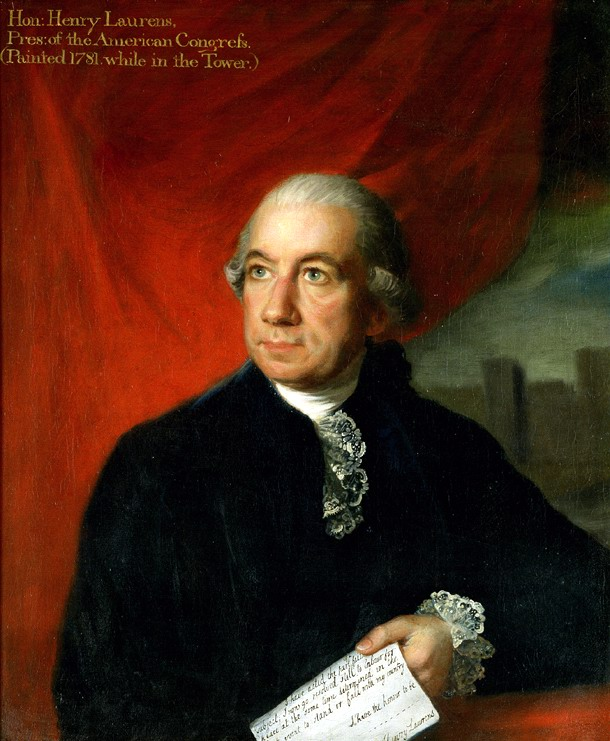
Henry Laurens, c.1781

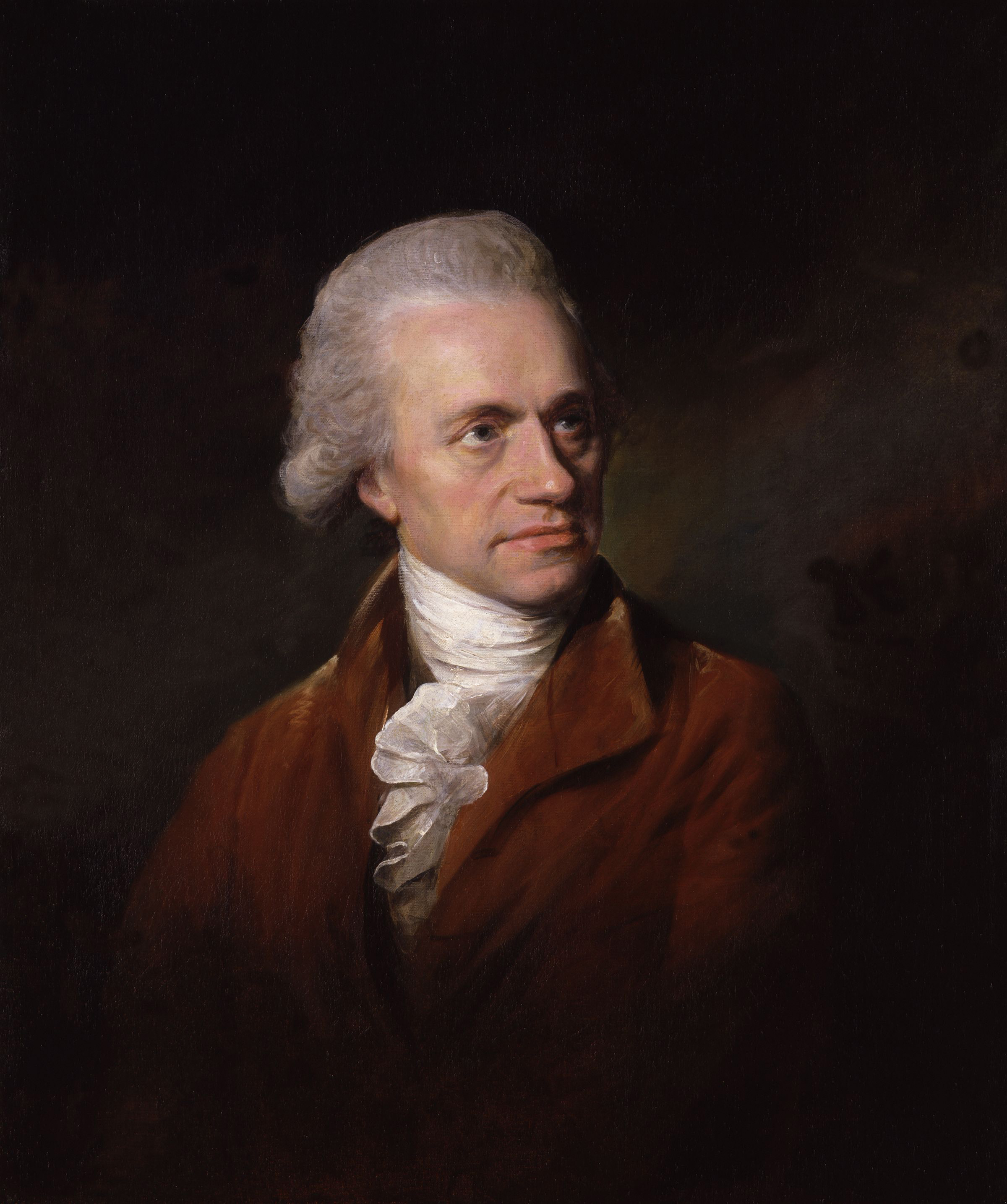
Portrait of William Herschel, 1785

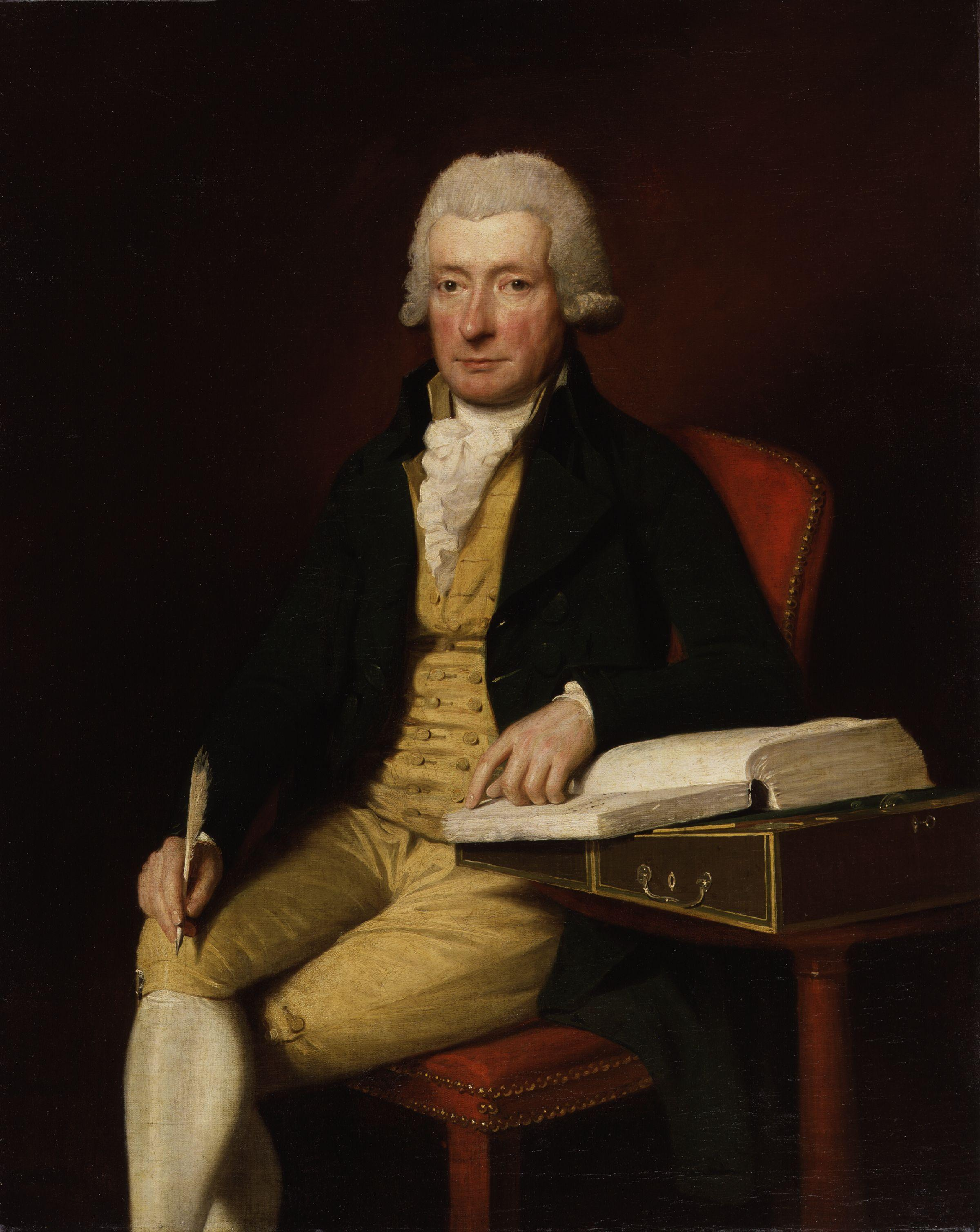
William Cowper, 1792

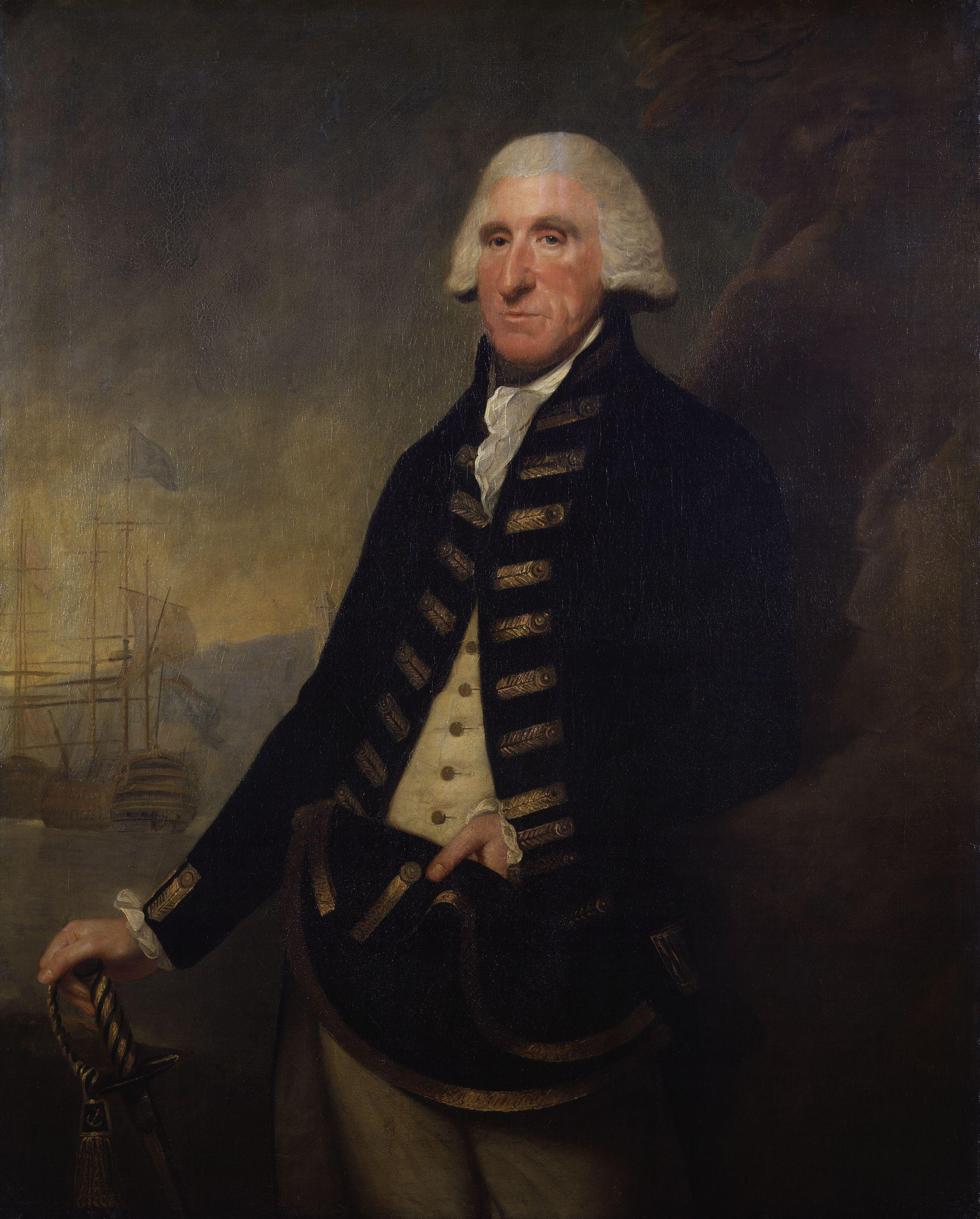
Lord Hood, 1795

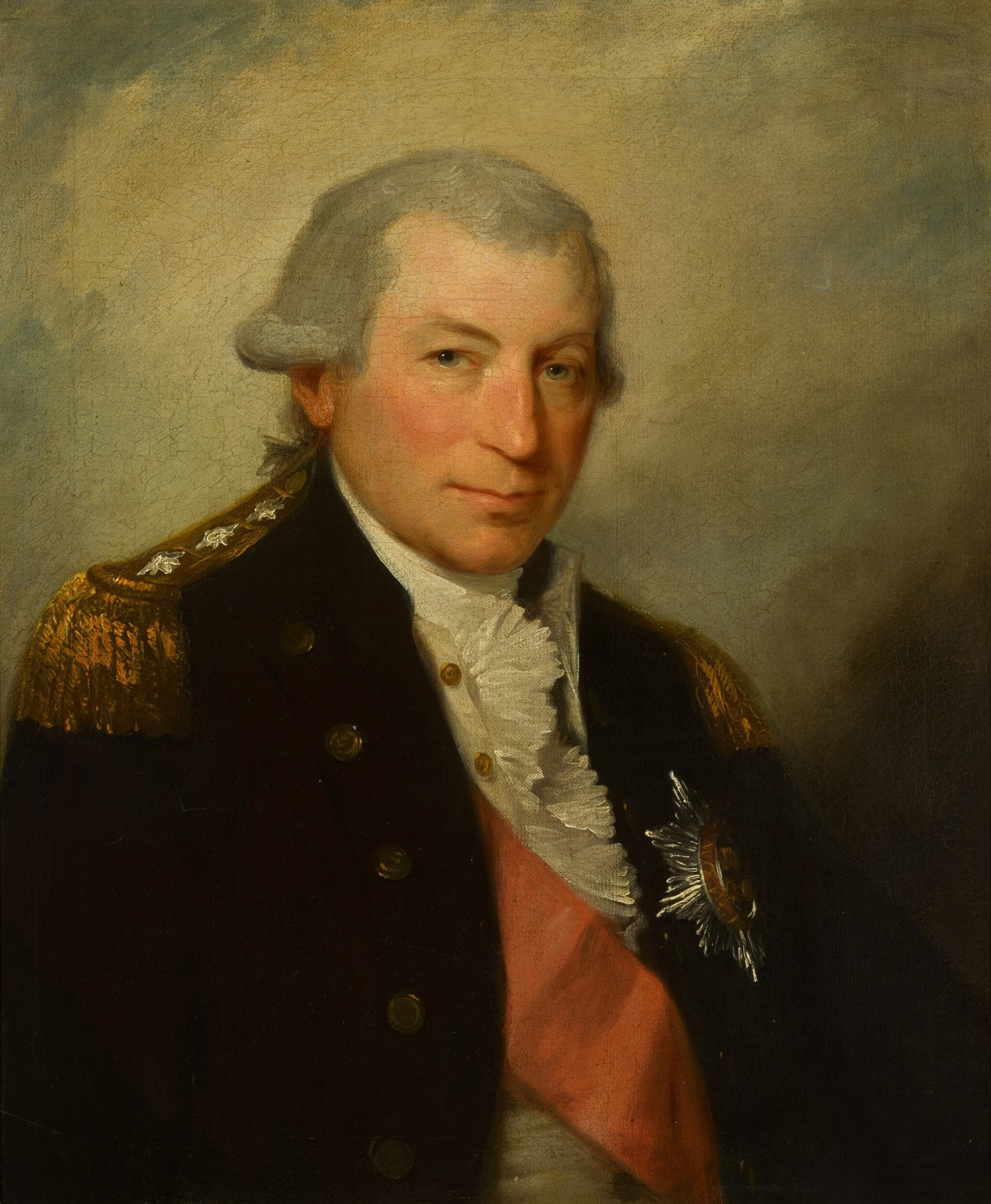
Earl St Vincent, 1795

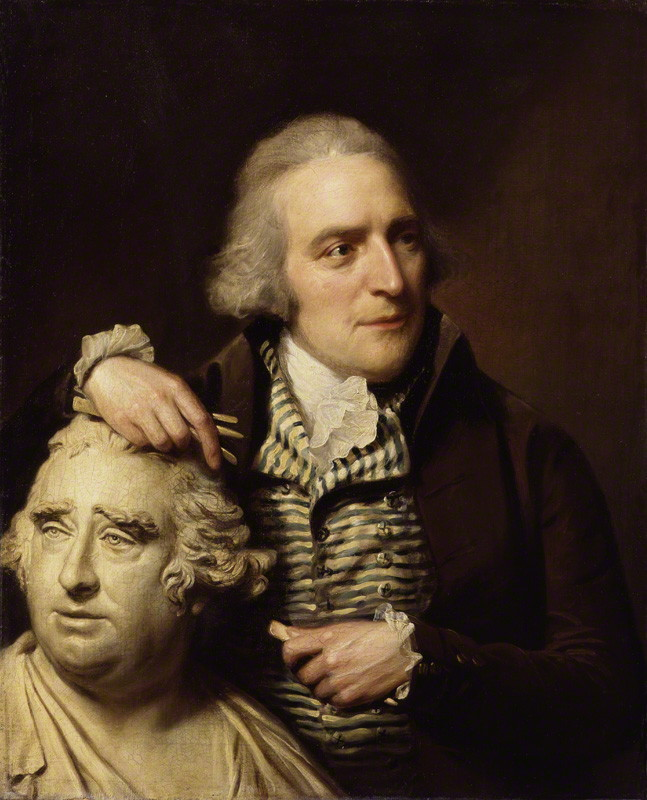
Portrait of Joseph Nollekens, c.1797

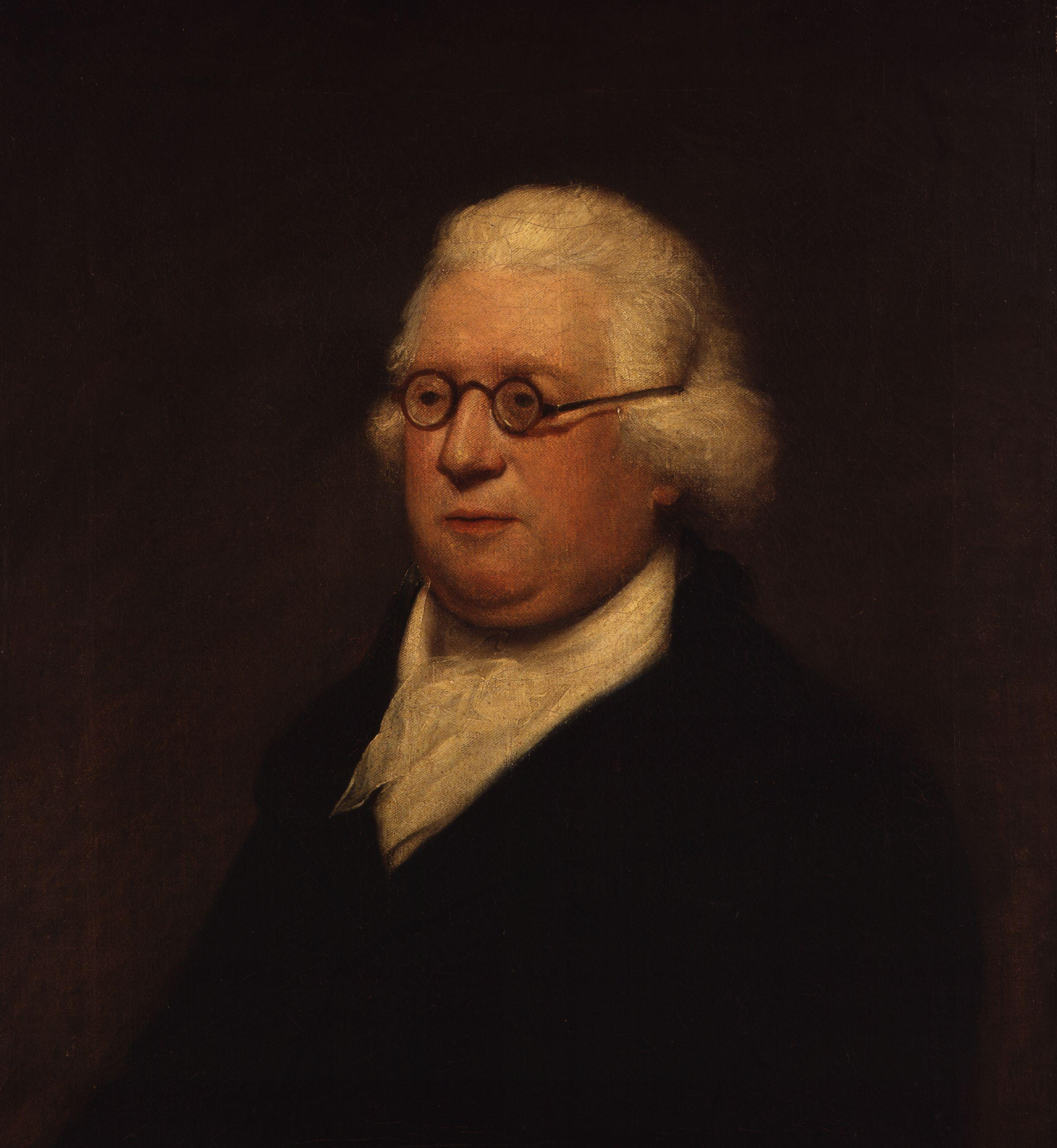
James Hook (composer) 1800
