= Casabianca (poem) =

1826 poem by Felicia Hemans

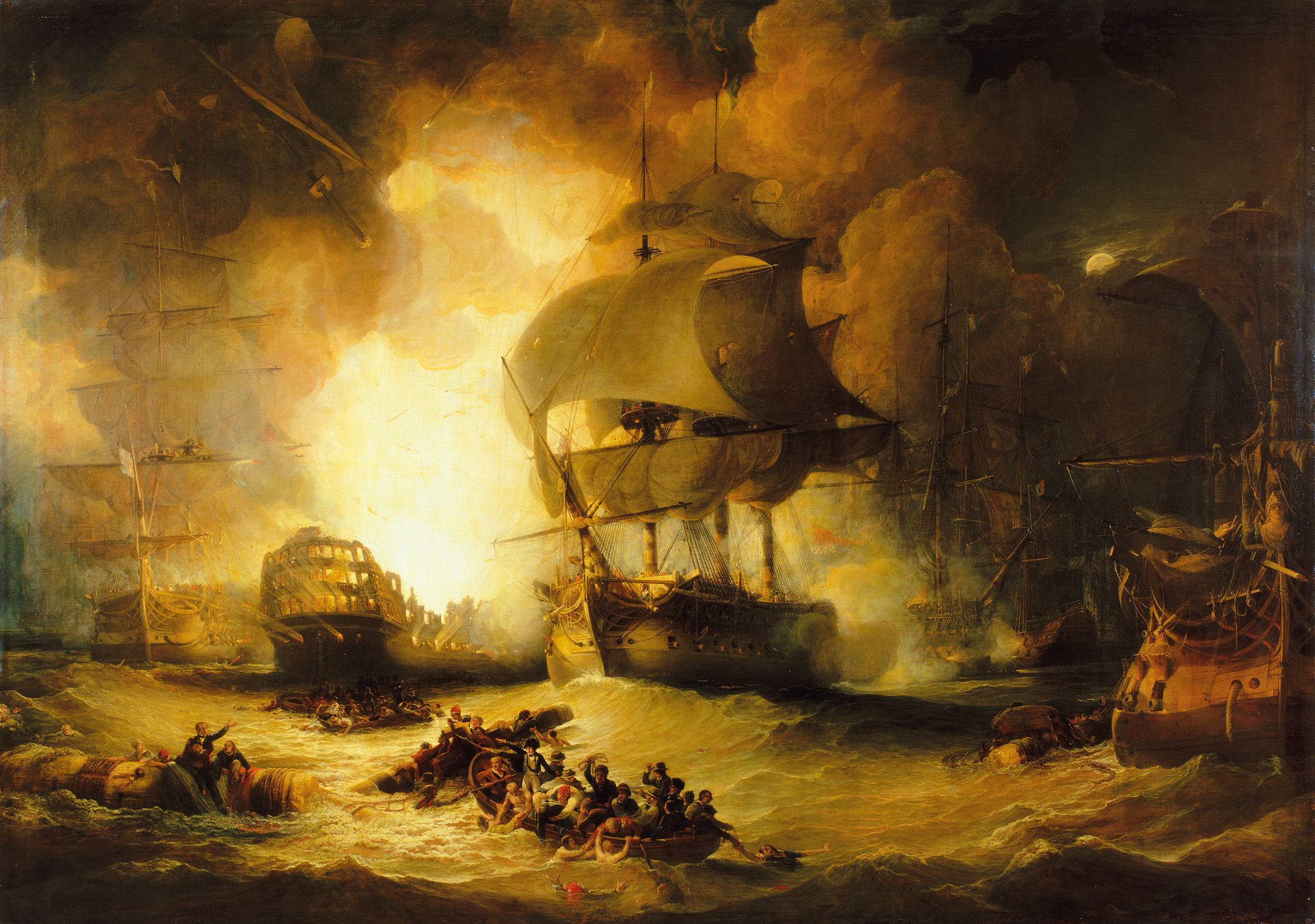
Destruction of L'Orient at the Battle of the Nile by George Arnald; the scene of the boy's death in 1798

"Casabianca" is a poem by the English poet Felicia Dorothea Hemans, first published in The Monthly Magazine, Vol 2, August 1826.

The poem starts:

The boy stood on the burning deck
Whence all but he had fled;
The flame that lit the battle's wreck
Shone round him o'er the dead.

It is written in ballad meter with the rhyme scheme ABAB. It is about the true story of a boy who was obedient enough to wait for his father's orders, not knowing that his father is no longer alive. It is perhaps not widely realised that the boy in the poem is French and not English; his nationality is not mentioned.

== History ==
The poem commemorates an actual incident that occurred in 1798 during the Battle of the Nile between British and French fleets on 1 August aboard the French flagship L'Orient. Giocante, the young son (his age is variously given as ten, twelve and thirteen) of the ship's commander Luc-Julien-Joseph Casabianca remained at his post and perished when at 22:00 the fire reached the magazine and the Orient was destroyed by a massive explosion which damaged nearby ships.

== Narrative ==
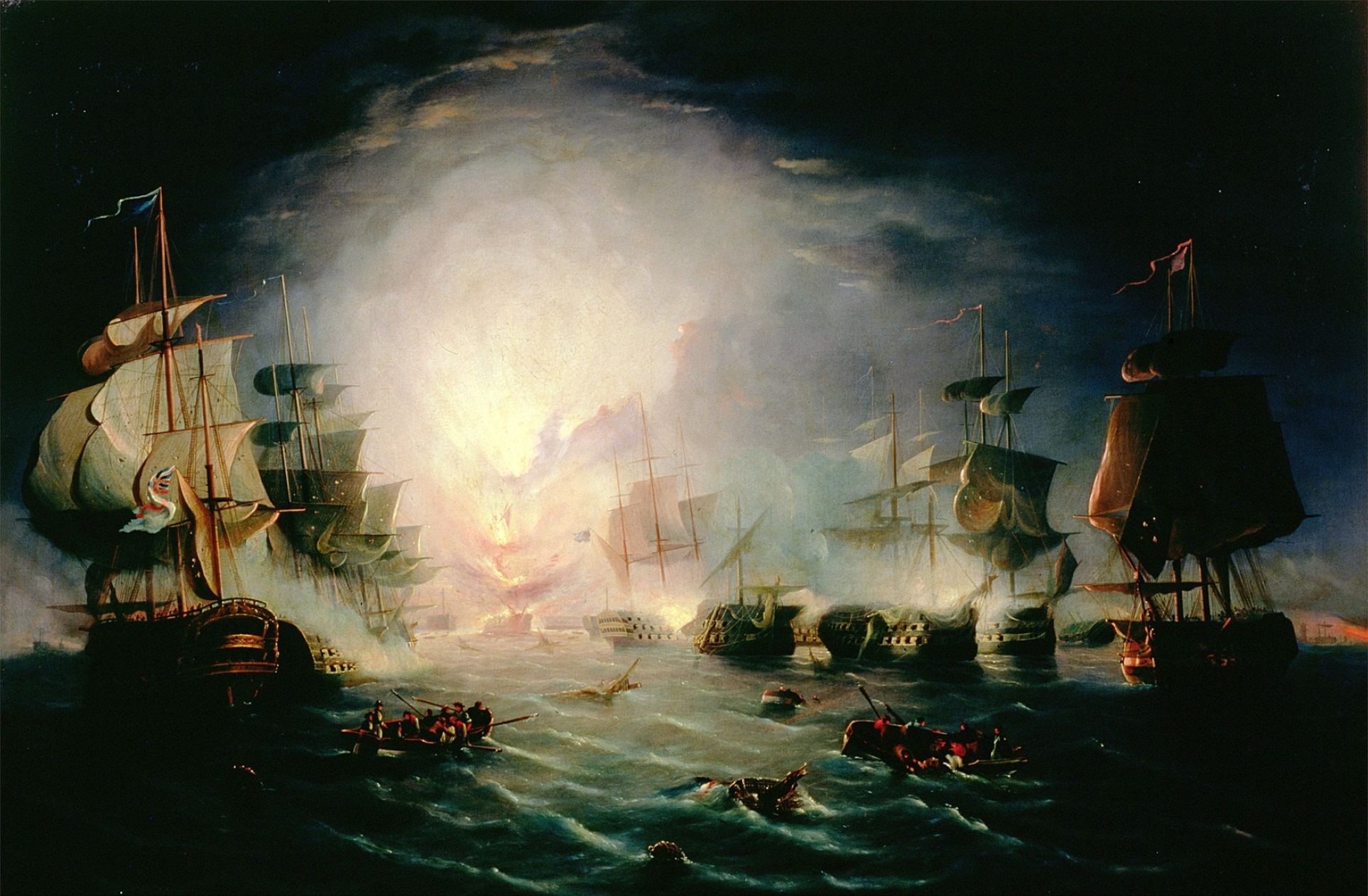
The blowing up of the French commander's ship "L'Orient" at the battle of the Nile, 1798, painting by John Thomas Serres

In Hemans' and other tellings of the story, young Casabianca refuses to desert his post without orders from his father. (It is sometimes said, rather improbably, that he heroically set fire to the magazine to prevent the ship's capture by the British.) It is said that he was seen by British sailors on ships attacking from both sides, but how any other details of the incident are known beyond the bare fact of the boy's death, is not clear. Hemans, not purporting to offer a history, but rather a poem inspired by the facts, writes:

Yet beautiful and bright he stood,
As born to rule the storm;
A creature of heroic blood,
A proud though child-like form.

The flames rolled on—he would not go
Without his Father's word;
That Father, faint in death below,
His voice no longer heard.

Hemans has him repeatedly, and heart-rendingly, calling to his father for instructions: "'say, Father, say/If yet my task is done?'" "'Speak, Father!' once again he cried/'If I may yet be gone! And'" at which point his voice is drowned out by "booming shots" until he "shouted but once more aloud/'My Father! must I stay?'" Alas, there is, of course, no response.

She concludes by commending the performances of both ship and boy:

With mast, and helm, and pennon fair,
That well had borne their part—
But the noblest thing which perished there
Was that young, faithful heart!

== Cultural impact ==
This poem was a staple of elementary school readers in the United Kingdom and the United States from roughly the 1850s through the 1950s. It is today remembered mostly as a tag line and as a topic of parodies. Some historians have claimed French poets also celebrated the event – notably André Chénier and Ponce Denis Écouchard Lebrun – apparently without noticing that the former was executed four years before the Battle of the Nile, so could not have written about these events. These claims for literary pedigree appear spurious.

The poem is referenced in Jack and Jill by Louisa May Alcott. A mother and children are discussing the actions of her son Jack, whom Jill responded that he was like Casabianca, "...a fine example of entire obedience. He obeyed orders, and that is what we all must do, without always seeing why, or daring to use our own judgement."

The story is referenced in Bram Stoker's Dracula. In chapter VII, in a newspaper account of a storm, the dead pilot of the ship Demeter is compared to "the young Casabianca".

The first line of the poem serves as the title and the inspiration for the short story "The Boy Stood on the Burning Deck" by C. S. Forester. In this version the hero, Ed Jones, remains at his station aboard the fictitious USS Boon during the Battle of Midway. A fire started in the bilge beneath his station in the engine room, but Jones remained at his station slowly roasting while the battle rages. At the conclusion of the battle he is relieved by a damage control party. Burned, he nonetheless survives the war.

In the book The Maltese Falcon by Dashiell Hammett, in Chapter 14, Sam Spade teases his assistant, Effie Perine, for spending the night in their office waiting for his return. "You told me to stay till you got back or phoned," she said. Spade, who had been unexpectedly kept from returning the previous evening, replied, "Oh, you're the sister of the boy who stood on the burning deck?"

In the book Swallowdale by Arthur Ransome, the Great Aunt is outmanoeuvred when she tasks Nancy and Peggy Blackett with learning the poem, without realising they already know it.

The 1950s rock and roll song "Rock-a-way" (best known through its recording by The Treniers) references the events of the poem and invokes the lyric "the boy who stood on the burning deck".

In the film Tinker Tailor Soldier Spy (Tomas Alfredson, 2011), the character Peter Guillam recites the poem to test the microphones in a safe house.

== Parody ==
Generations of schoolchildren created parodies based on the poem. One, recalled by Martin Gardner, editor of Best Remembered Poems, went:

The boy stood on the burning deck,
The flames 'round him did roar;
He found a bar of Ivory Soap
And washed himself ashore.

Another childhood parody runs:

The boy stood on the burning deck,
Amid the fiery flickers;
A spark flew up his trouser leg
And burnt away his knickers.

Spike Milligan also parodied the opening of the poem:

The boy stood on the burning deck
Whence all but he had fled -
Twit!

Eric Morecambe created another parody:

The boy stood on the burning deck
His lips were all a-quiver
He gave a cough, his leg fell off
And floated down the river.

American modernist Elizabeth Bishop created a poem based on this poem called "Casabianca" too:

Love's the boy stood on the burning deck
trying to recite "The boy stood on
the burning deck." Love's the son

stood stammering elocution
while the poor ship in flames went down.

Love's the obstinate boy, the ship,
even the swimming sailors, who
would like a schoolroom platform, too,

or an excuse to stay
on deck. And love's the burning boy.
