= Harriet Browne =

Harriet Browne may refer to:

- Harriet Browne (composer) (1798–1858), English writer and composer
- Harriet Browne (dancer) (1932–1997), American tap dancer, educator and choreographer
- Harriet Louisa Browne (1829–1906), New Zealand political salon hostess, community leader and letter-writer
