= Portrait of Horatio Nelson (Abbott) =

Painting by Lemuel Francis Abbott

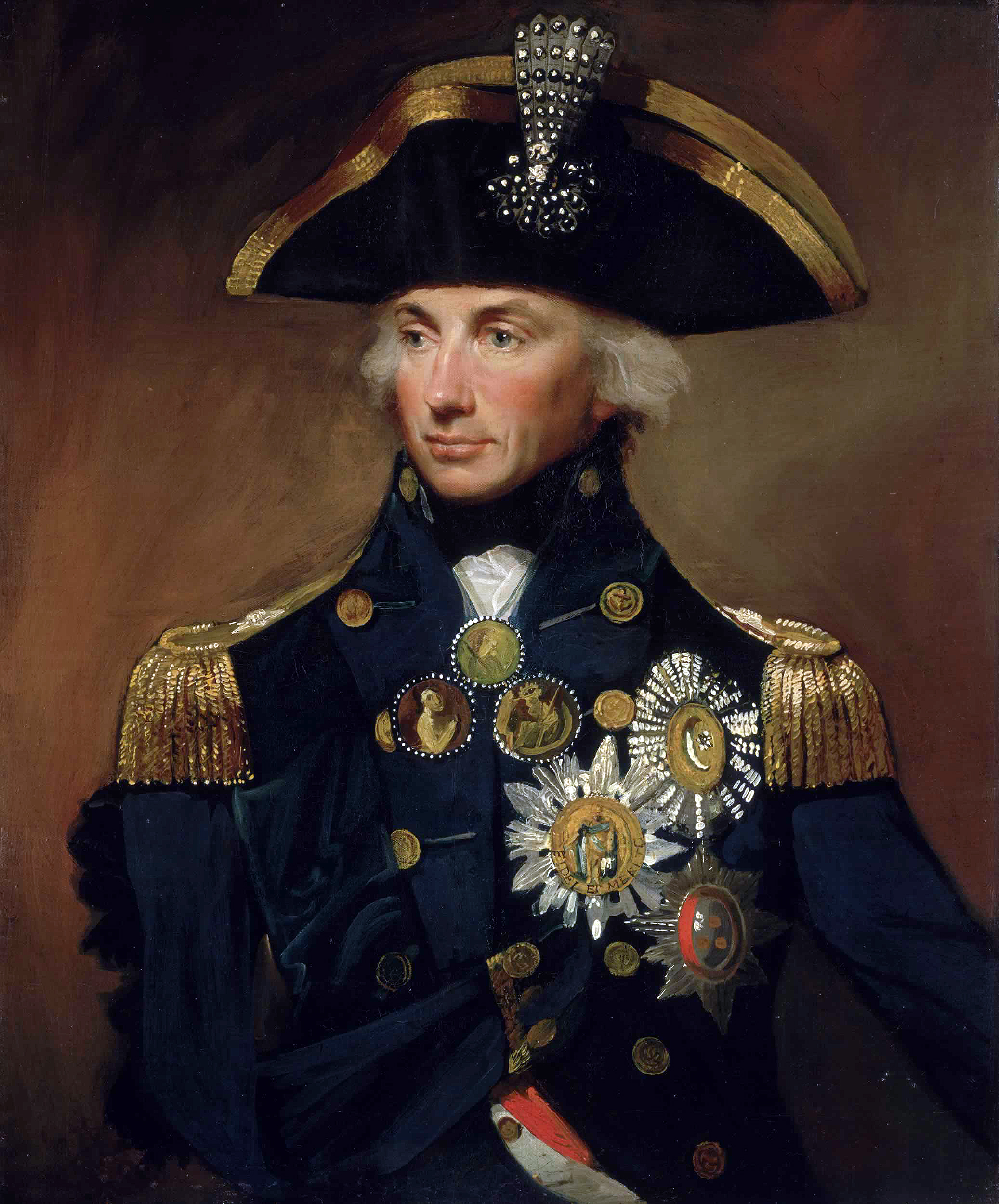
- Artist: Lemuel Francis Abbott
- Year: 1799
- Type: Oil on canvas, portrait painting
- Dimensions: 76.2 cm × 63.5 cm (30.0 in × 25.0 in)
- Location: National Maritime Museum, London

Portrait of Horatio Nelson is a 1799 portrait painting by the British artist Lemuel Francis Abbott. It depicts the Royal Navy admiral Horatio Nelson, shown at half-length in the uniform of rear-admiral wearing a variety of decorations including the star of the Knight of the Bath and awards given to him by Naples and the Ottoman Empire. In his hat he wears the diamond chelengk presented to him by the Ottoman Sultan Selim III following his victory at the Battle of the Nile. The sleeve of the arm he lost during the Attack on Santa Cruz is folded across his chest.

Abbott produced several variations of paintings featuring Nelson, beginning in 1797, this was at the behest of the admiral's mentor and former commander William Locker. This version, the best known, was commissioned for Nelson's friend and prize agent Alexander Davison. The portrait was displayed at the Painted Hall of Greenwich Hospital for many years. A 1894 painting England's Pride and Glory by Thomas Davidson shows a young naval cadet looking at the picture for inspiration. It is now part of the collection of the National Maritime Museum in Greenwich.

== Bibliography ==
- Gill, Ellen. Naval Families, War and Duty in Britain, 1740-1820. Boydell Press, 2016.
- Walker, Richard John Boileau. The Nelson Portraits: An Iconography of Horatio, Viscount Nelson. Royal Naval Museum Publications, 1998.
