= Luc-Julien-Joseph Casabianca =

French Navy officer and politician

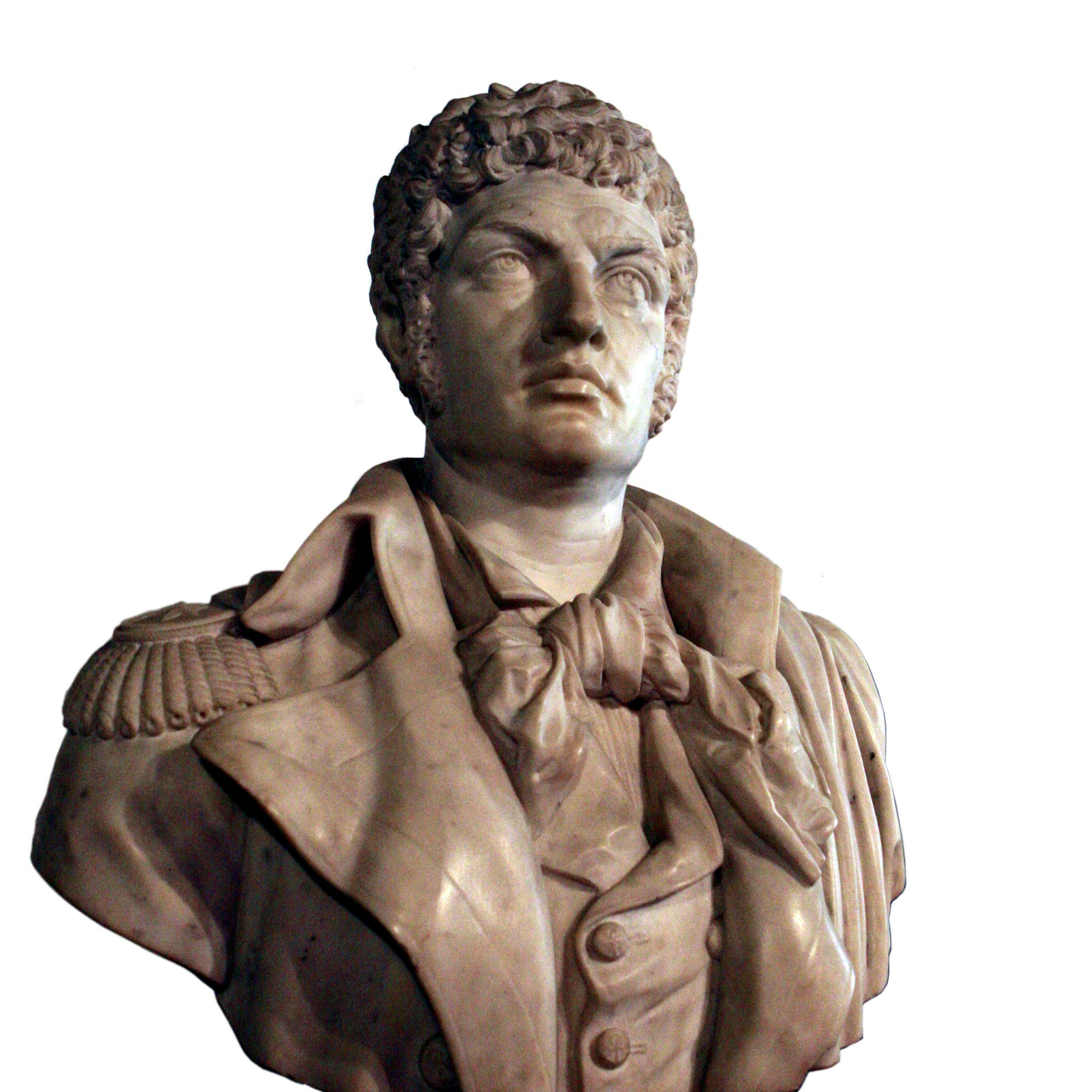
- Bust of Casabianca
- Born: 7 February 1762; Vescovato, Haute-Corse, Corsican Republic
- Died: 1 August 1798 (aged 36) Abu Qir Bay, Egypt Eyalet
- Allegiance: Kingdom of France; French First Republic
- Branch: French Navy
- Rank: Ship-of-the-line captain
- Commands: Orient
- Conflicts: French Revolutionary Wars: Battle of the Nile
- Other work: Deputy for Corsica at the National Convention

Captain Luc-Julien-Joseph Casabianca (7 February 1762 – 1 August 1798) was a French Navy officer and politician who served in the French Revolutionary Wars. He was killed at the Battle of the Nile.

== Career ==
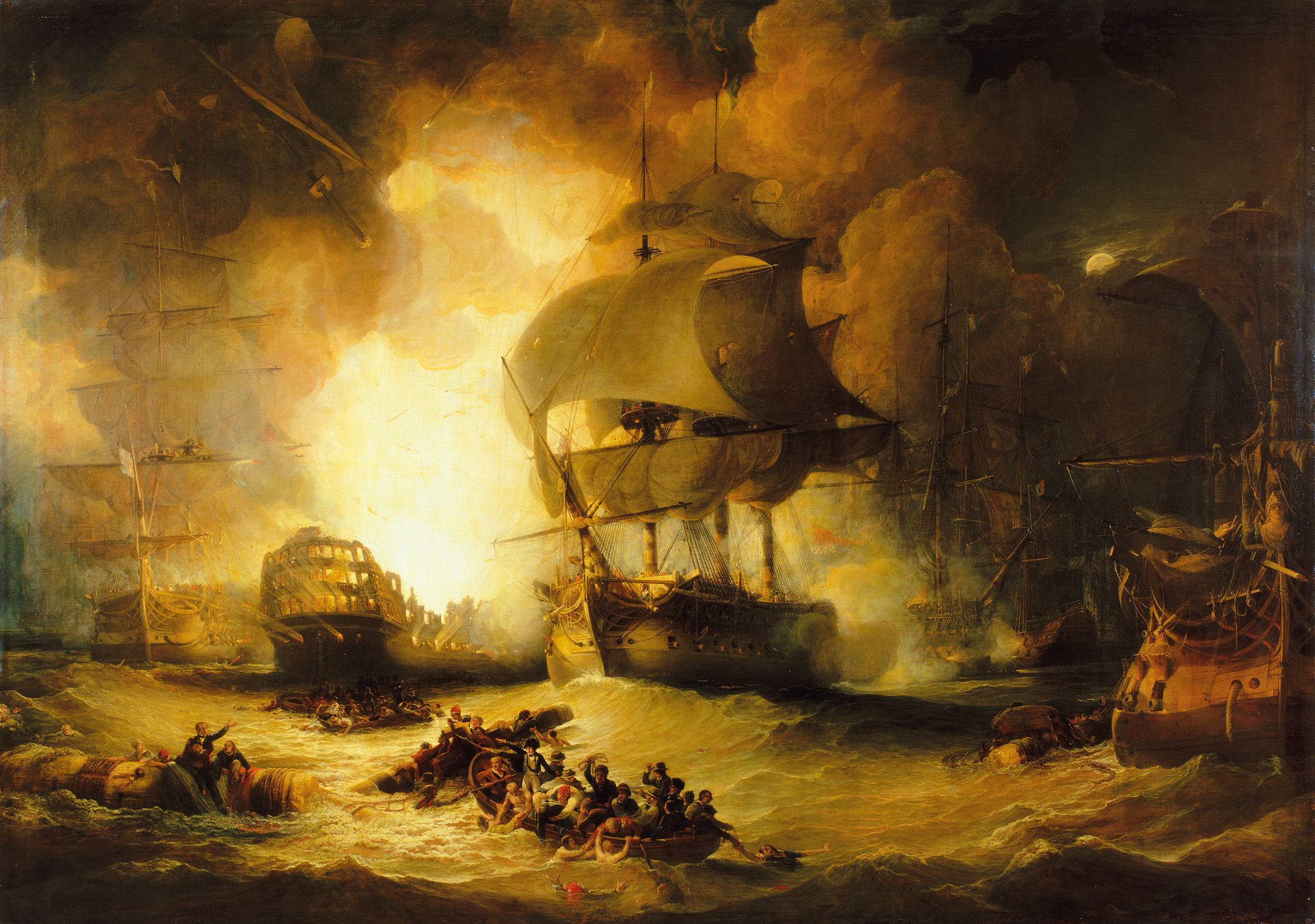
The Destruction of 'L'Orient' at the Battle of the Nile, 1 August 1798 (1825-1827) by George Arnald, National Maritime Museum

Casabianca distinguished himself in the Royal French Navy, was a deputy for Corsica at the National Convention, then became member of the Council of Five Hundred. He was the commander of flagship Orient, which transported Napoleon across the Mediterranean during his expedition to Egypt.

During the Battle of the Nile of 1 August 1798, where Rear-Admiral Horatio Nelson destroyed the French fleet in Aboukir Bay, Casabianca fought until his death. During the course of battle, he ordered Giocante, his 10-year-old son who accompanied him, to remain in a section of the ship until he called for him. Although the ship was on fire, the boy, who did not know that his father was no longer alive, refused to leave his post without receiving his orders. After the fire reached the gunpowder section, the ship exploded; the child perished, along with an unknown number of crewmen.

== Posterity ==
=== Literature ===
The English poet Felicia Hemans made the death of Giocante Casabianca the subject of her poem "Casabianca" in 1826, with its line "The boy stood on the burning deck ...", which became a classic of English literature and was studied in elementary school classes.

At least six ships of the French Navy have borne the name Casabianca.

== See also ==
- Levant Fleet
- Flotte du Ponant
