= Thomas Davidson (painter) =

English painter (1842–1919)

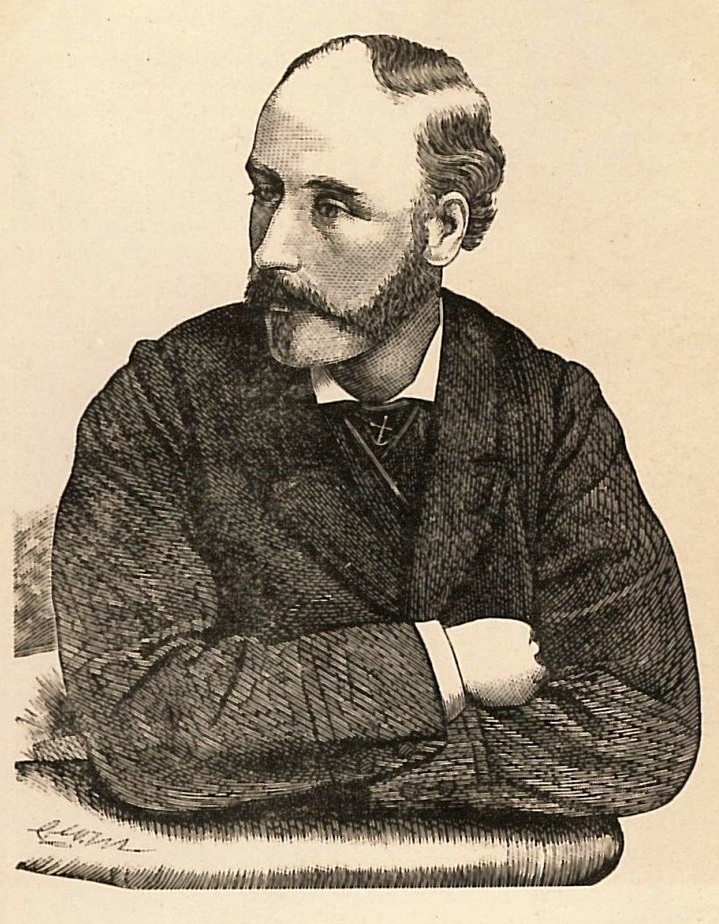
- Portrait by Charles Webb Moore, 1879
- Born: 17 January 1842; St George Hanover Square; London, England
- Died: November 1919 (aged 77); Walberswick, Suffolk

Thomas Davidson RA (17 January 1842 – November 1919) was an English painter specialising in historical naval scenes.

== Life ==
Davidson was born on 17 January 1842 in St George Hanover Square, London, England. He lost his hearing at age four, whereupon he was sent as a private pupil to the Old Kent Road Asylum for the Deaf and Dumb, and subsequently attended a "hearing" school in Clapham.

Showing a flair for art, Davidson was admitted to the National Art Training School, Marlborough House (later the Royal College of Art); he went on to study under Francis Stephen Cary (1808-1880), James Mathews Leigh (1808-1860), and Alexander Johnston (1815-1891), before spending ten years at the Royal Academy, where he won the academy's silver medals.

In 1871, Davidson married artist Charlotte Douglas McHeath (1851-1930) in Marylebone; records show that in 1881 they were living with their six children at 82 Park Road, Hampstead, and in 1901 at 101 Greencroft Gardens, Hampstead. Davidson retired in 1908 to Mill Field, Walberswick, Suffolk, where he died aged 77 in November 1919.

The artist was closely associated with St Saviour's Church, being part of the Deaf and Dumb Debating Society and on the Committee of the Charitable and Provident Society for the Deaf and Dumb. St Saviour's was located then on Oxford Street, London; the Oxford Street site is now a sports shop opposite Selfridges on the corner of Lumley Street.

Davidson's approach to persevering with disability in a not universally compassionate age made him an erudite man. A 1917 book titled Peeps into the Deaf World records him as saying: "I am a great reader, and have read history, biography, books on travel, religion, and novels, besides the daily newspapers, and it is a great comfort – this reading – to one who is deaf, and to whom little is said." His friends included Samuel Bright Lucas, son of suffragette Margaret Bright Lucas and nephew of MP John Bright, and wood engraver Charles Webb Moore, who was part of Frank Brangwyn's circle and responsible for Davidson's portrait. He was the father of artist Allan Douglas Davidson (1873-1932).

== Work ==
England's Pride and Glory; 1894.

Davidson specialised in historical naval scenes. For periods his painting focused on particular themes; for example, he completed between 1894 and 1899 a series relating to Lord Nelson, including the referential England's Pride and Glory (1894) which incorporates remarkable reproductions of three Nelson-related works by other painters. The large painting to the left is George Arnald's The Destruction of 'L'Orient' at the Battle of the Nile, 1 August 1798; at the upper-right is Richard Westall's Nelson in conflict with a Spanish launch, 3 July 1797; and, to the lower-right, the most famous portrait of Nelson, by Lemuel Francis Abbott. Several other of Davidson's paintings illustrate episodes in the work of the Brontë family.

Davidson exhibited at the Royal Birmingham Society of Artists, Dudley Museum and Art Gallery, the Royal Glasgow Institute of the Fine Arts, Liverpool's Walker Art Gallery, Manchester City Art Gallery, the Royal Academy, the Royal Society of British Artists, the Royal Hibernian Academy, the Royal Institute of Oil Painters, and the Arthur Tooth & Sons Gallery. He was a member and regular exhibitor at the Ipswich Art Club, 1912–1919.

Davidson's painting for St Saviour's Church, Ephphatha – described by minister Reverend F. W. G. Gilby, O.B.E. as the church's principal adornment – illustrates the miracle of the healing of the deaf mute of Decapolis in Mark 7:31-37.

== Gallery ==
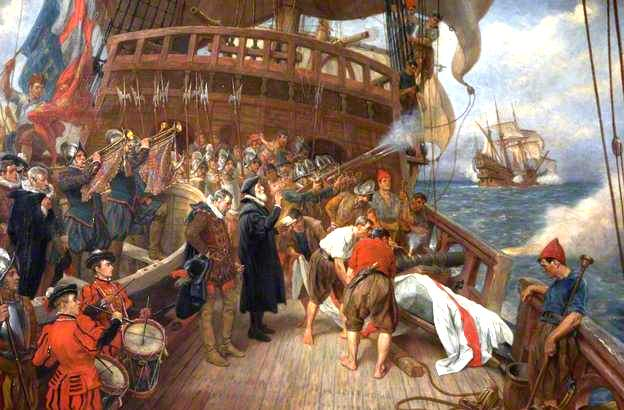
Burial of Admiral Drake; Buckland Abbey. Drake as memorialised absence.

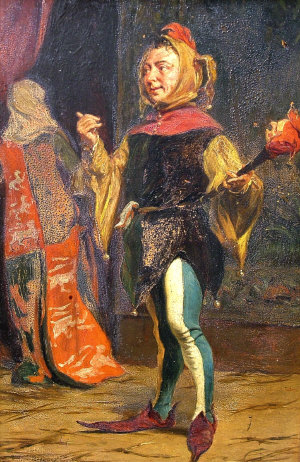
The Court Jester; 1877.

The Pensioner's Story, 1883; National Maritime Museum.

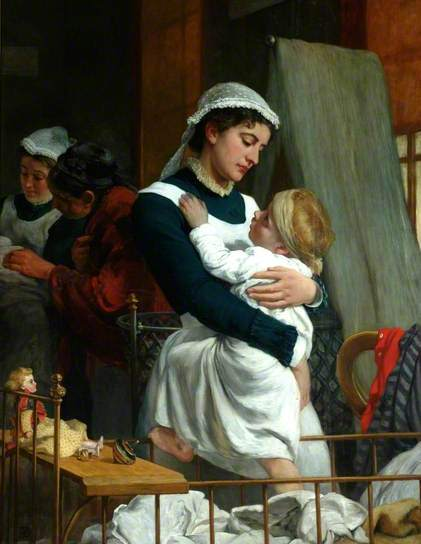
A Star in the East; Cartwright Hall Art Gallery.
