= Allan Douglas Davidson =

English painter of female nudes (1873–1932)

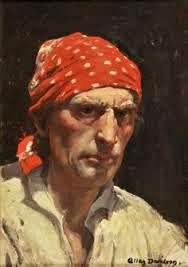
Allan Douglas Davidson Selfportrait

Allan Douglas Davidson, R.B.A., R.O.I., R.M.S. (1873–1932) was an English painter who predominantly worked in oils and specialized in female nudes.

== Life and work ==
Allan Davidson was born in London on 14 May 1873. His father was the historical painter Thomas Davidson (1842–1919). Allan studied art at the Royal Academy Schools in London, where he won a medal and the Armitage Prize, he also studied at the Académie Julian in Paris. He was elected to the Royal Institute of Oil Painters in 1921 and was also a member of the Langham Sketching Club. He painted a small work for Queen Mary's Dolls' House.

He lived the majority of his life in London before retiring to Walberswick in Suffolk. He died on 19 April 1932.

== Exhibitions ==
He exhibited prolifically at all the major London exhibitions including 20 works at the Royal Academy between 1905 and 1931.
