= England's Pride and Glory =

Painting by Thomas Davidson

- Artist: Thomas Davidson
- Year: 1894
- Type: Oil on canvas, genre painting
- Dimensions: 91.8 cm × 71.1 cm (36.1 in × 28.0 in)
- Location: National Maritime Museum, London

England's Pride and Glory is an 1894 oil painting by the British artist Thomas Davidson. Produced in the late Victorian era, it shows a scene in the Painted Hall of the Royal Naval College at the site of the historic Greenwich Hospital. A young naval cadet accompanied by his mother is shown looking at the Portrait of Horatio Nelson by Lemuel Francis Abbott, a source of patriotic inspiration. The boy's enraptured expression is likely combined with his mother's advice that he should seek to emulate the long-dead admiral. It was part of a wider nostalgia for the era of the Age of Sail. Also shown are Victory of the Nile by George Arnald and Nelson in Conflict with a Spanish Launch by Richard Westall.

Davidson's painting is now in the collection of the National Maritime Museum, along with the three pictures depicted in the work.

== Bibliography ==
- Begiato, Joanne, Thayer, Johnathan & Downing, Karen (eds.) Negotiating Masculinities and Modernity in the Maritime World, 1815–1940: A Sailor’s Progress?. Springer International Publishing, 2022.
- Gill, Ellen. Naval Families, War and Duty in Britain, 1740-1820. Boydell Press, 2016.
