= Felicia Hemans =

English poet (1793-1835)

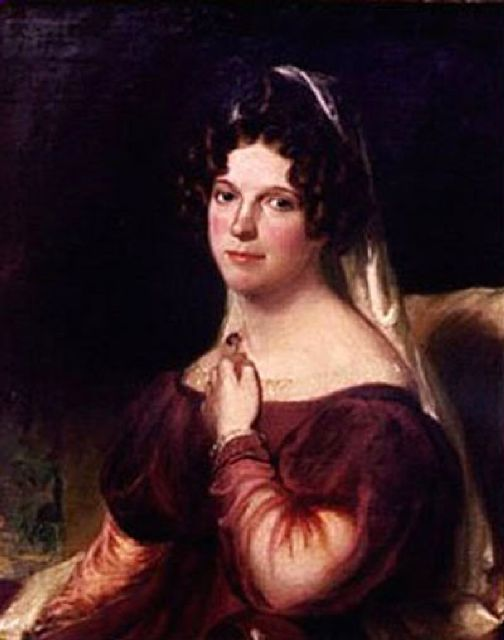
- Felicia Hemans by William Edward West
- Born: 25 September 1793; Liverpool, Lancashire, England
- Died: 16 May 1835 (aged 41); Dublin, County Dublin, Ireland
- Occupation: Poet
- Writing career
- Period: Late Romantic
- Genre: Poetry

Felicia Dorothea Hemans (25 September 1793 – 16 May 1835) was an English poet (who identified as Welsh by adoption). Regarded as the leading female poet of her day, Hemans was immensely popular during her lifetime in both England and the United States, and was second only to Lord Byron in terms of sales. Two of her opening lines, "The boy stood on the burning deck" and "The stately homes of England", have acquired classic status.

== Early life and education ==
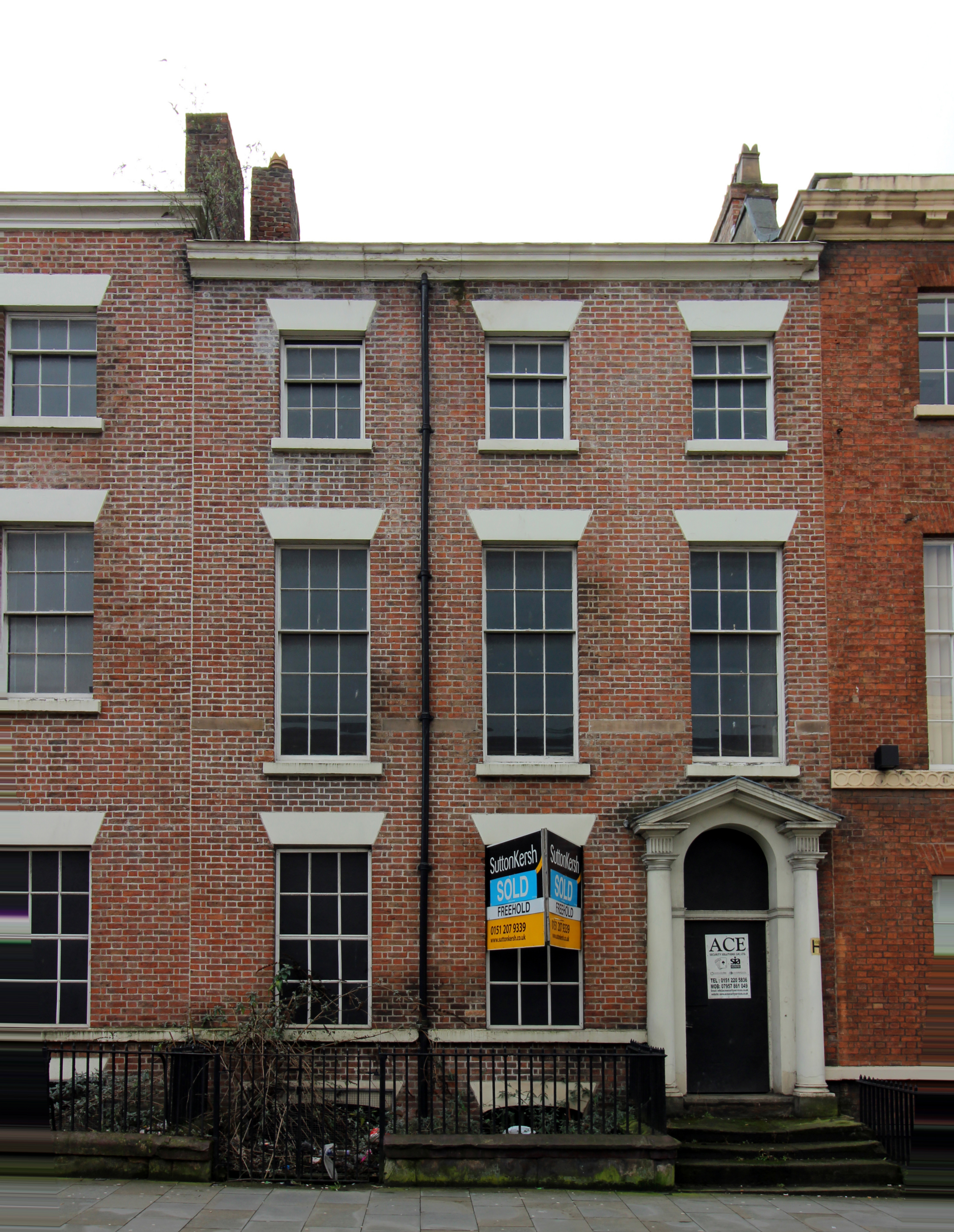
118 Duke Street, Liverpool, birthplace of Felicia Hemans

Felicia Dorothea Browne was born on 25 September 1793, at 118 Duke Street, Liverpool. She was the daughter of George Browne, who worked for his father-in-law's wine importing business and succeeded him as Tuscan and imperial consul in Liverpool. Her mother, Felicity, was the daughter of Benedict Paul Wagner (1718–1806), wine importer at 9 Wolstenholme Square, Liverpool and Venetian consul for that city. Hemans was the fourth of six children (three boys and three girls) to survive infancy. Her sister Harriet collaborated musically with Hemans and later edited her complete works (7 vols. with memoir, 1839). George Browne's business soon brought the family to Denbighshire in North Wales, where she spent her youth. They lived in a cottage within the grounds of Gwrych Castle near Abergele when Felicia was seven years old until she was sixteen and in 1809 moved to Bronwylfa, St. Asaph (Flintshire). She later called Wales "Land of my childhood, my home and my dead". Lydia Sigourney says of her education:

The nature of the education of Mrs. Hemans, was favourable to the development of her genius. A wide range of classical and poetical studies, with the acquisition of several languages, supplied both pleasant aliment and needful discipline. She required not the excitement of a more public system of culture,—for the never-resting love of knowledge was her school master.

Hemans was proficient in Welsh, French, German, Italian, Spanish and Portuguese. Her sister Harriet remarked that "One of her earliest tastes was a passion for Shakspeare, which she read, as her choicest recreation, at six years old."

== Career ==
Hemans' first poems, dedicated to the Prince of Wales, were published in Liverpool in 1808, when she was fourteen, arousing the interest of poet Percy Bysshe Shelley, who briefly corresponded with her. She quickly followed them up with "England and Spain" (1808), politically addressing the Peninsular War, and "The Domestic Affections" (1812), with the latter published just before her marriage to Captain Alfred Hemans. In contrast to its title, which Hemans did not choose, many of the book's poems explore issues of patriotism and war.

From "Casabianca" (1826)

The boy stood on the burning deck,
Whence all but he had fled;
The flame that lit the battle's wreck
Shone round him o'er the dead.

Yet beautiful and bright he stood,
As born to rule the storm;
A creature of heroic blood,
A proud though childlike form.

— From "Casabianca"
October 1826

Between 1821 and 1823, she started to study German. Her favourite German poet was Theodor Körner.

On December 12, 1823, her 'Vespers of Palermo' works was reenacted as a play at Covent garden, the leading actors were; Welsh actor Charles Kemble and English actor Charles Mayne Young, for this, she received £200 for the copyright (£20,000 in 2024 after inflation). The play was a failure and any other planned shows were cancelled. The following year, the show was put on again at Edinburgh with greater success with Harriet Siddons reciting the epilogue written by Sir Walter Scott (who became Felicia's cordial friend), an alteration which was requested by Joanna Baillie.

Hemans' major collections, including The Forest Sanctuary (Which started in 1824 and published in 1825), Records of Woman and Songs of the Affections (1830) were highly popular. Hemans published many of her pieces in magazines first, enabling her to remain in the public eye and adapt to her audience, as well as earning additional income. Many of her pieces were used for schoolroom recitations and collections were presented as school prizes, especially to female readers.

Her last books, published in 1834, were Scenes and Hymns of Life and National Lyrics, and Songs for Music. It has been suggested that her late religious poetry, like her early political poetry, marks her entry into an area of dispute that was both public and male-dominated.

At the time of her death in 1835, Hemans was a well-known literary figure, highly regarded by contemporaries, and with a popular following in the United States and the United Kingdom. Both Hemans and Wordsworth were identified with ideas of cultural domesticity that shaped the Victorian era.

== Personal life ==
On 30 July 1812, Felicia Browne married Captain Alfred Hemans, an Irish army officer some years older than herself. The marriage took her away from Wales, to Daventry in Northamptonshire (where Alfred was an adjutant of the Northamptonshire militia) until 1814, the year her father died in Québec on a business trip. During their first six years of marriage, Hemans gave birth to five sons, including G. W. Hemans and Charles Isidore Hemans, and then the couple separated. Marriage had not, however, prevented her from continuing her literary career. Several volumes of poetry were published by the respected firm of John Murray in the period after 1816, beginning with The Restoration of the Works of Art to Italy (1816) and Modern Greece (1817). The collection Tales and Historic Scenes was released in 1819. She was awarded £50 (equivalent to ~£3,600 in 2024) for the best poem on The Meeting of Wallace and Bruce on the Banks of the Carron, this year would also be Hemans' separation. In 1821 Felicia the Royal Society of Literature awarded her for the best poem on the subject of Dartmoor, to which, she began on her play, The Vespers of Palermo.

In 1825, one of Felicia's brothers purchased her home at Bronwylfa and she moved to Rhyllon near the River Clwyd, her time there would the most tranquil period of her life. After she left this address, it appears that her sister; Harriet Mary Owen moved into Rhyllon with her husband; Rev William HIcks Owen (who was the correspondent for the Earl of Powis).

One of the reasons why Hemans was able to write prolifically as a single parent, was that many of the domestic duties of running a household were taken over by her mother, with whom she and her children lived. It was a financial necessity for Hemans to write to support herself, her mother, and the children. On 11 January 1827, Hemans' mother died, leading to the breaking up of the household and her mental state. Whilst pregnant to her fifth child, Hemans sent her two oldest sons to Rome to join their father, and moved to a suburb of Liverpool with her younger sons. Felicia and Alfred continued to exchange letters with one another, in these letters they often consulted about their children.

""..from leaving Wales, and many kind and 'old familiar faces' there, as well as from the breaking up of my family on the occasion of my arrival here, over-shadowed by constant depression."

— [Extract from a letter to Felicia's friend; Mary Howitt (dated December 11, 1828) explaining how she felt leaving Wales] - 'Memoir of the Life and Writings of Felicia Hemans by Miss Browne' - published 1845

From 1831, Hemans lived in Dublin, which was recommended as healthier than Liverpool. Despite the change, she continued to experience poor health. She died on 16 May 1835. Sources suggest that she had suffered from an attack of scarlet fever, followed by a "consumptive decline", or by "dropsy". She may have experienced rheumatic fever and heart problems as well as circulatory problems. She was buried in St. Ann's Church, Dawson Street, Dublin. William Wordsworth mentioned her in a memorial stanza, and Letitia Elizabeth Landon, Lydia Huntley Sigourney, and Walter Savage Landor composed memorial verses in her honour. Lydia Huntley Sigourney also wrote a memoir to preface an American edition of Hemans' collected works.

== Legacy ==
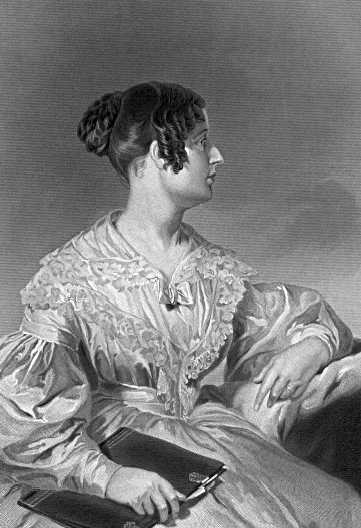
Felicia Hemans, by Evert A. Duykinick, 1873

Hemans's works appeared in nineteen individual books during her lifetime, publishing first with John Murray and later with Blackwoods. After her death in 1835, her works were republished widely, usually as collections of individual lyrics and not the longer, annotated works and integrated series that made up her books. For surviving female poets, such as Caroline Norton, Letitia Elizabeth Landon, Lydia Sigourney and Frances Harper, the French Amable Tastu and German Annette von Droste-Hülshoff, she was a valued model. To many readers she offered a woman's voice confiding a woman's trials; to others, a lyricism consonant with Victorian sentimentality and patriotism. In her most successful book, Records of Woman (1828), she chronicles the lives of women, both famous and anonymous. Portraying examples of heroism, rebellion, and resistance, she connects womanhood with "affection's might". Among the works she valued most were the unfinished "Superstition and Revelation" and the pamphlet "The Sceptic," which sought an Anglicanism more attuned to world religions and women's experiences.

Hemans' poem "The Homes of England" (1827) is the origin of the phrase "stately home", referring to an English country house.

From "The Homes of England"

The stately Homes of England,
How beautiful they stand!
Amidst their tall ancestral trees,
O'er all the pleasant land;
The deer across their greensward bound
Through shade and sunny gleam,
And the swan glides past them with the sound
Of some rejoicing stream.

The free, fair Homes of England!
Long, long in hut and hall,
May hearts of native proof be reared
To guard each hallowed wall!
And green forever be the groves,
And bright the flowery sod,
Where first the child's glad spirit loves
Its country and its God.

— From "The Homes of England"
(1827)

Despite her illustrious admirers her stature as a serious poet gradually declined, partly due to her success in the literary marketplace. Her poetry was considered morally exemplary, and was often assigned to schoolchildren; as a result, Hemans came to be seen as more a poet for children rather than a serious author. Schoolchildren in the U.S. were still being taught "The Landing of the Pilgrim Fathers in New England" in the middle of the 20th century. But by the 21st century, "The Stately Homes of England" refers to Noël Coward's parody, not to the once-famous poem it parodied.

With the rise in women's studies, Hemans' critical reputation has been re-examined. Her work has resumed a role in standard anthologies and in classrooms and seminars and literary studies, especially in the US. Anthologised poems include "The Image in Lava," "Evening Prayer at a Girls' School," "I Dream of All Things Free", "Night-Blowing Flowers", "Properzia Rossi", "A Spirit's Return", "The Bride of the Greek Isle", "The Wife of Asdrubal", "The Widow of Crescentius", "The Last Song of Sappho", "Corinne at the Capitol" and "The Coronation of Inez De Castro".

== Casabianca ==
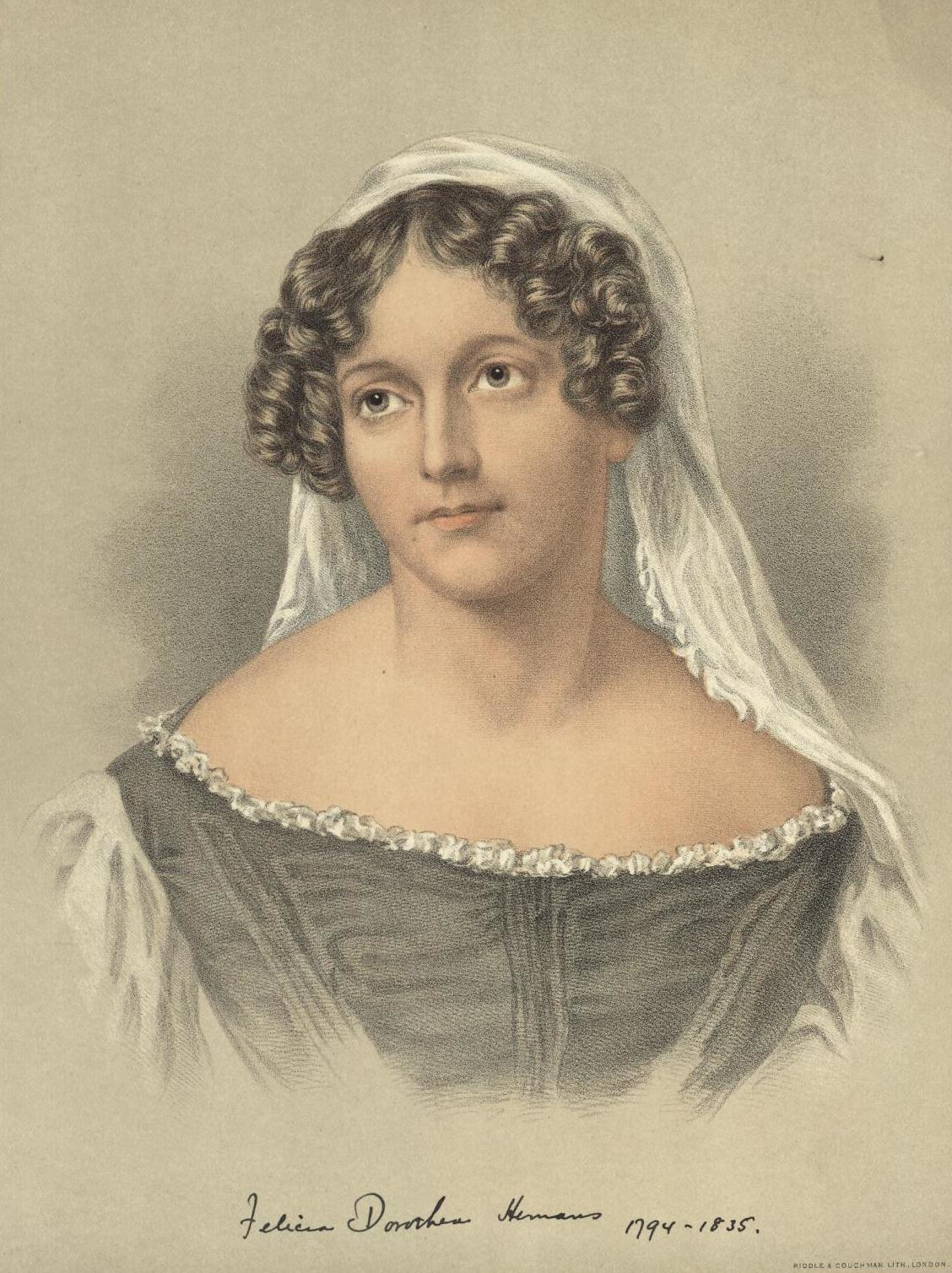
Portrait of Felicia Dorothea Hemans c.1820

First published in August 1826 the poem Casabianca (also known as The Boy stood on the Burning Deck) by Hemans depicts Captain Luc-Julien-Joseph Casabianca and his 12-year-old son, Giocante, who both perished aboard the ship Orient during the Battle of the Nile. The poem was very popular from the 1850s on and was memorized in elementary schools for literary practice. Other poetic figures such as Elizabeth Bishop and Samuel Butler allude to the poem in their own works.

"'Speak, Father!' once again he cried / 'If I may yet be gone! / And'—but the booming shots replied / And fast the flames rolled on." 'Casabianca' by Felicia Hemans.

The poem is sung in ballad form (abab) and consists of a boy asking his father whether he had fulfilled his duties, as the ship continues to burn until the magazine catches fire. Hemans adds the following note to the poem: 'Young Casabianca, a boy about thirteen years old, son to the Admiral of the Orient, remained at his post (in the Battle of the Nile) after the ship had taken fire, and all the guns had been abandoned, and perished in the explosion of the vessel, when the flames had reached the powder.'

Martin Gardner included Casabianca in his collection of ''Best Remembered Poems'', along with a childhood parody. Michael R. Turner included it among the "improving gems" of his 1967 ''Parlour Poetry''. Others wrote modern-day parodies that were much more upbeat and consisted of boys stuffing their faces with peanuts and bread. These contrast sharply with the dramatic image created in Hemans' Casabianca.

== England and Spain, or, Valour and Patriotism ==
Her second book, England and Spain, or, Valour and Patriotism, was published in 1808 and was a narrative poem honouring her brother and his military service in the Peninsular War. The poem called for an end to the tyranny of Napoleon Bonaparte and for a long-lasting peace. Multiple references to Albion, an older name for Great Britain, emphasize Hemans's patriotism.

"For this thy noble sons have spread alarms, and bade the zones resound with BRITAIN's arms!"

== Female suicide in Hemans' works ==
Several of Hemans's characters take their own lives rather than suffer the social, political and personal consequences of their compromised situations. At Hemans's time, women writers were often torn between a choice of home or the pursuit of a literary career. Hemans herself was able to balance both roles without much public ridicule, but left hints of discontent through the themes of feminine death in her writing. The suicides of women in Hemans's poetry dwell on the same social issue that was confronted both culturally and personally during her life: the choice of caged domestication or freedom of thought and expression.

"The Bride of the Greek Isle", "The Sicilian Captive", "The Last Song of Sappho" and "Indian Woman's Death Song" are some of the most notable of Hemans' works involving women's suicides. Each poem portrays a heroine who is untimely torn from her home by a masculine force – such as pirates, Vikings, and unrequited lovers – and forced to make the decision to accept her new confines or command control over the situation. None of the heroines are complacent with the tragedies that befall them, and the women ultimately take their own lives in either a final grasp for power and expression or a means to escape victimisation.

== Selected works ==
Coeur De Lion At The Bier Of His Father

Torches were blazing clear,
Hymns pealing deep and slow,
Where a king lay stately on his bier
In the church of Fontevraud.
As if each deeply furrowed trace
Of earthly years to show, -
Alas! that sceptred mortal's race
Had surely closed in woe!

And the holy chant was hushed awhile,
As, by the torch's flame,
A gleam of arms up the sweeping aisle
With a mail-clad leader came.
He came with haughty look,
An eagle-glance and clear;
But his proud heart through its breast-plate shook
When he stood beside the bier!

"Oh, father! is it vain,
This late remorse and deep?
Speak to me, father! once again,
I weep, - behold, I weep!
Alas! my guilty pride and ire!
Were but this work undone,
I would give England's crown, my sire!
To hear thee bless thy son.

"Thou that my boyhood's guide
Didst take fond joy to be! -
The times I've sported at thy side,
And climbed thy parent knee!
And there before the blessed shrine,
My sire! I see thee lie, -
How will that sad still face of thine
Look on me till I die!"

— From the "Coeur De Lion At The Bier
Of His Father" poem
- Poems by Felicia Dorothea Browne (1808)
- "England and Spain" by Felicia Dorothea Browne (1808)
- The Domestic Affections and Other Poems by Felicia Dorothea Browne (1812)
- "Our Lady's Well"
- "On the Restoration of the Works of Art to Italy" (Two editions, 1816)
- "Modern Greece" (1817)
- Translations from Camoens; and Other Poets, with Original Poetry (1818)
- Hymns on the Works of Nature, for the Use of Children
- Records of Woman: With Other Poems
- "The Better Land"
- The Vespers of Palermo (1823, play)
- Casabianca (1826, poem)
- "Corinne at the Capitol"
- "Evening Prayer at a Girls' School"
- "A Farewell to Abbotsford"
- "The Funeral Day of Sir Walter Scott"
- "Hymn by the Sick-bed of a Mother"
- "Kindred Hearts"
- "The Last Song of Sappho"
- "Lines Written in the Memoirs of Elizabeth Smith"
- "The Rock of Cader Idris"
- "Stanzas on the Late National Calamity, On the Death of the Princess Charlotte"
- "Stanzas to the Memory of George III"
- "Thoughts During Sickness: Intellectual Powers"
- "To the Eye"
- "To the New-Born"
- "Woman on the Field of Battle"
- "De Châtillon" (or 'The Crusaders', a poem which was published after her death, the original manuscript for this was lost, but from a surviving rough copy, the poem was compiled and published)
