= French ship Casabianca =

Several ships of the French Navy have been named Casabianca. Luc-Julien-Joseph Casabianca was a French naval officer, killed at the Battle of the Nile in 1798 during the French Revolutionary Wars.

- Casabianca was an armed djerme on the Nile in 1798.
- Casabianca was a paddle-wheel aviso between 1859 and 1877.
- Casabianca was a D'Iberville-class aviso between 1895 and 1915.
- Casabianca (1935) was a Redoutable-class submarine launched in 1936 and scrapped in 1952.
- Casabianca (D631) was a T 47-class destroyer launched in 1954 and scrapped in 1983.
- Casabianca (S603) is a Rubis-class nuclear attack submarine launched in 1984 and currently in service.
- Casabianca (Q---) is the 6th planned Suffren-class nuclear attack submarine.
