= French ship Orient (1791) =

Ship of the line of the French Navy

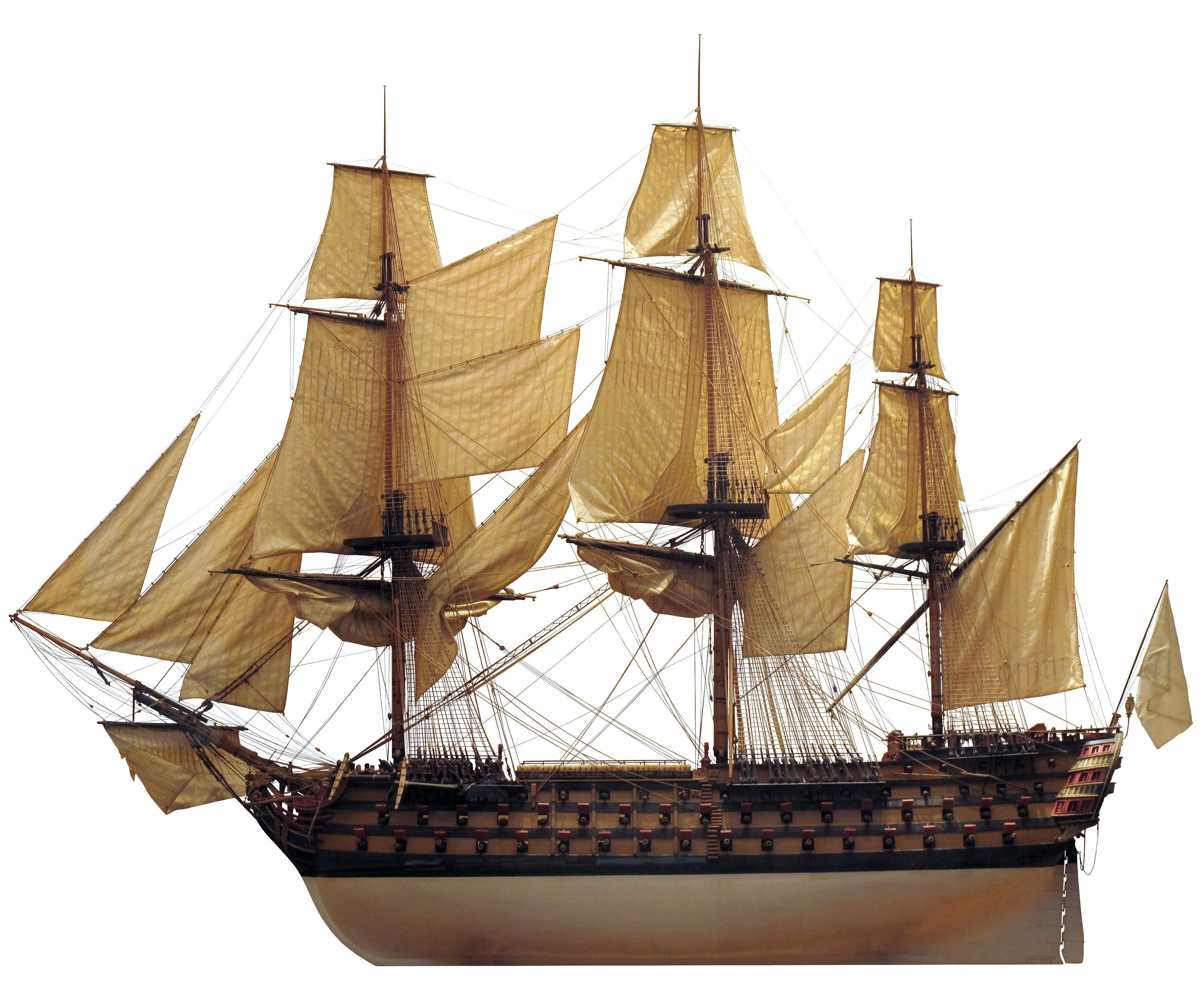
- Model of Commerce de Marseille, Orient's sister ship

History

France
- Name: Dauphin-Royal
- Builder: Toulon Arsenal
- Laid down: May 1790
- Launched: 20 July 1791
- Commissioned: August 1793
- Out of service: August 1798
- Renamed: Sans-Culotte September 1792; Orient May 1795
- Fate: Destroyed by explosion at the Battle of the Nile, 1 August 1798

General characteristics
- Class & type: Océan-class ship of the line
- Displacement: 5,095 tonneaux
- Tons burthen: 2,794–2,930 port tonneaux
- Length: 65.18 m (213 ft 10 in) (196.6 French feet)
- Beam: 16.24 m (53 ft 3 in) (50 French feet)
- Draught: 8.12 m (26 ft 8 in) (25 French feet)
- Propulsion: sail
- Sail plan: 3,265 m^{2} (35,140 sq ft)
- Complement: 1,079
- Armament: 120 guns: Lower deck: 32 36-pounder guns; Middle deck: 34 24-pounder guns; Upper deck: 34 12-pounder guns; Quarterdeck and forecastle: 18 × 8-pounder guns, 6 × 36-pounder carronades

Orient was an 118-gun Océan-class ship of the line of the French Navy best known for her role as flagship of Vice-Admiral François-Paul Brueys d'Aigalliers' fleet at the Battle of the Nile on 1 August 1798, and for her spectacular destruction that day when her magazine exploded. The event was commemorated by numerous poems and paintings. Prior to its destruction, Orient was one of the largest warships in the world.

== Career ==
The ship was laid down in Toulon, and launched on 20 July 1791 under the name Dauphin Royal. In September 1792, after the advent of the French First Republic, and not yet commissioned, she was renamed Sans-Culotte, in honour of the Sans-culottes.

On 14 March 1795, she took part in the Battle of Genoa as flagship of Rear Admiral Martin. She covered the rear of the French line, exchanging fire with HMS Bedford and HMS Egmont, but lost contact with her fleet during the night and was thus prevented from taking further part in the action. In May 1795, Sans-Culotte was again renamed as a consequence of the Thermidorian Reaction. She was renamed Orient by Napoleon Bonaparte on the morning of his departure from the port of Toulon for his expedition on Egypt. The new name was kept secret until the last moment to shadow the purpose of the large expeditionary force assembled at Toulon, which very few people had known was destined to invade Egypt.

In 1798 Orient was appointed flagship of the squadron tasked with invading Egypt, which was under Vice-Admiral François-Paul Brueys d'Aigalliers with Captain Luc-Julien-Joseph Casabianca as his flag officer. Orient also ferried the chiefs of the Armée d'Égypte, notably General Bonaparte. The fleet avoided the British blockade and captured Malta before landing troops in Egypt. After the French looted the Knightly order fortress of Valetta of all its treasure and gold plate & bullion, a lot of it was loaded on the Orient (its estimated value was 9.3 million Francs, which Bonaparte hoped to put to good use in funding his expedition, but most of it was lost with the Orient later on). Afterwards, the squadron anchored in a bay east of Alexandria, in a purportedly strong defensive position. The British squadron under the command of Nelson discovered the fleet on 1 August, and Nelson attacked at 5.40pm the same day, starting the Battle of the Nile. Nelson had his units sail between the shore and the French ships at anchor, picking them one by one in a cross-fire. The British ship Bellerophon set anchor too late and found itself directly abeam the portside of the Orient. The two-deck ship, with a broadside of thirty gun, was no match for the Orient, and was completely dismasted and savaged in its cannon duel with the Orient. The Bellerophon cut her anchor free and drifted away from the fighting. Later on two British ships which had arrived late from their scouting mission (the Alexander and Swiftsure) arrived and attacked the burning Orient from her bow and stern. After burning for an hour, the Orient exploded spectacularly at 22:30.

The number of casualties is disputed: the British reported 70 survivors, reflecting the numbers they rescued aboard their ships, and inferring considerable losses over the 1,130-man complement; however, the crew was far from complete at the time of the battle (many had been on shore leave, and many others dispatched to Alexandria to purchase supplies) and a number of survivors might have been picked up by French ships. Contre-amiral Decrès reported as many as 760 survivors.

The explosion is also often presented as a turning point of the battle; as a matter of fact, the battle was won by the British when their reinforcements arrived at nightfall, and the interruption of the fighting was brief after the explosion.

== Legacy ==
The explosion of Orient struck the public of the time because of its historical signification and spectacular aesthetics. Its romantic load was compounded by the presence aboard of Captain Luc-Julien-Joseph Casabianca's young son, who died in the wreck, this particular detail inspired Felicia Hemans's poem Casabianca:

The boy stood on the burning deck
Whence all but he had fled;
The flame that lit the battle's wreck
Shone round him o'er the dead

Shortly after the battle, Nelson was presented with a coffin carved from a piece of the main mast of Orient, which had been taken back to England for this purpose. He was put inside this coffin after his death at the Battle of Trafalgar.

== Archaeology ==
Between 1998 and 1999, the French archaeologist Franck Goddio led an expedition that carried out an underwater archaeological study of Orient's wreck site. Recovered artifacts included such items as coins, small arms, printing type from a printing press and personal possessions of crew members carried on board the vessel. The distribution of wreckage and artifacts on the sea floor lead Goddio to suggest that Orient was not destroyed by a single explosion, but by two almost simultaneous explosions.

== Gallery ==
Depictions of the explosion of Orient
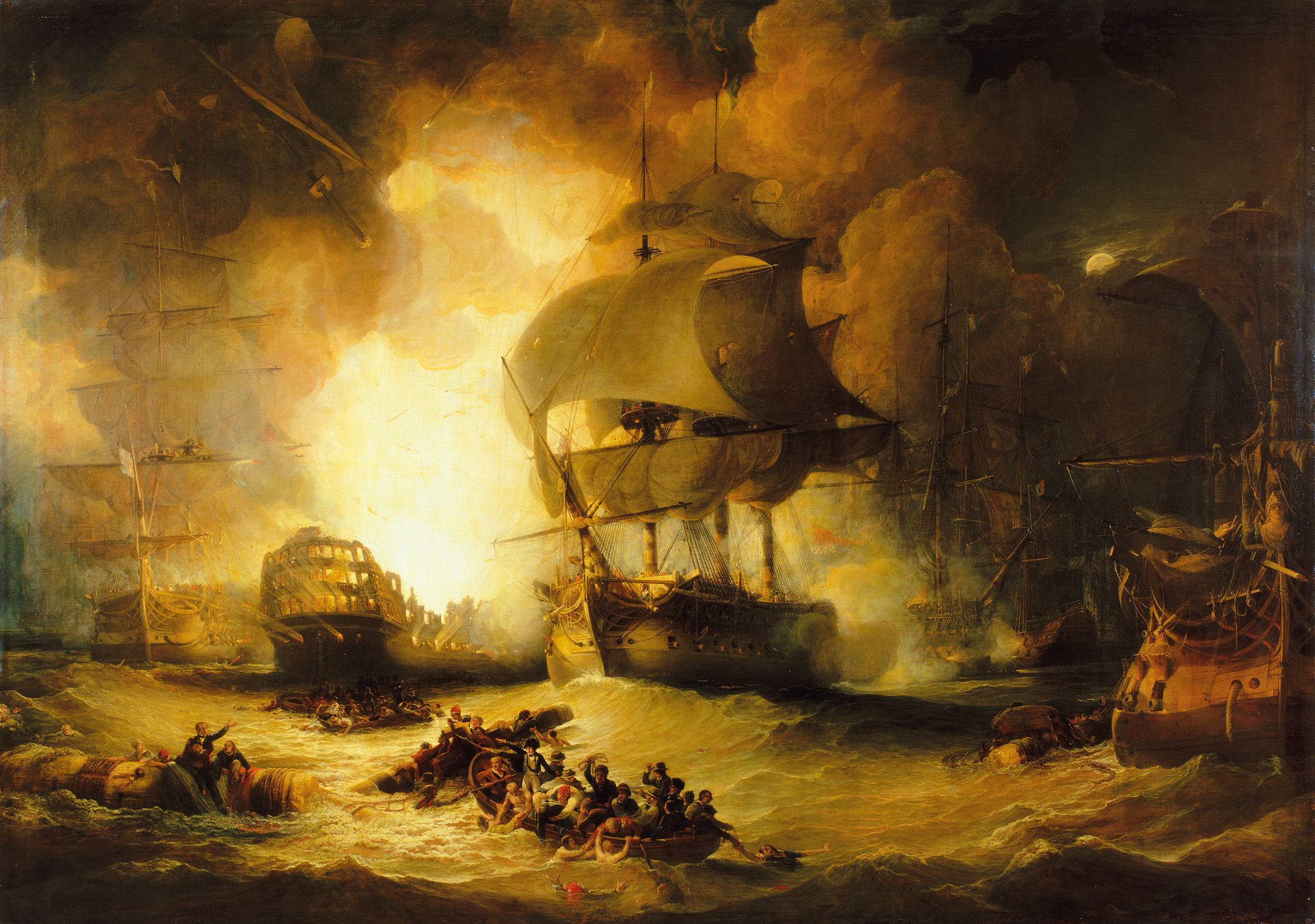
The destruction of L'Orient at the Battle of the Nile, 1 August 1798, painting by George Arnald, on display at the National Maritime Museum.

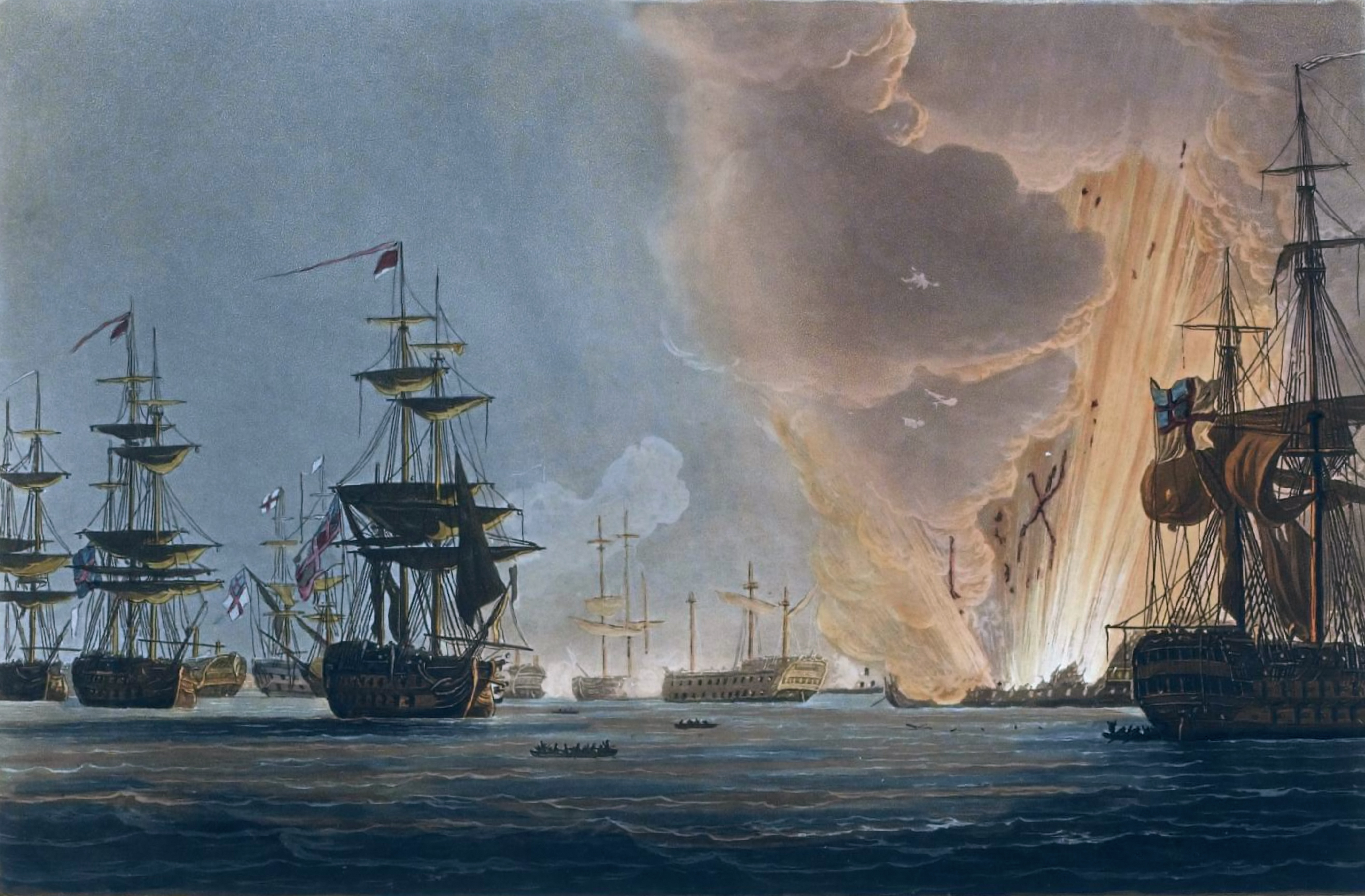
The Battle of the Nile, August 1st 1798, painting by Thomas Whitcombe

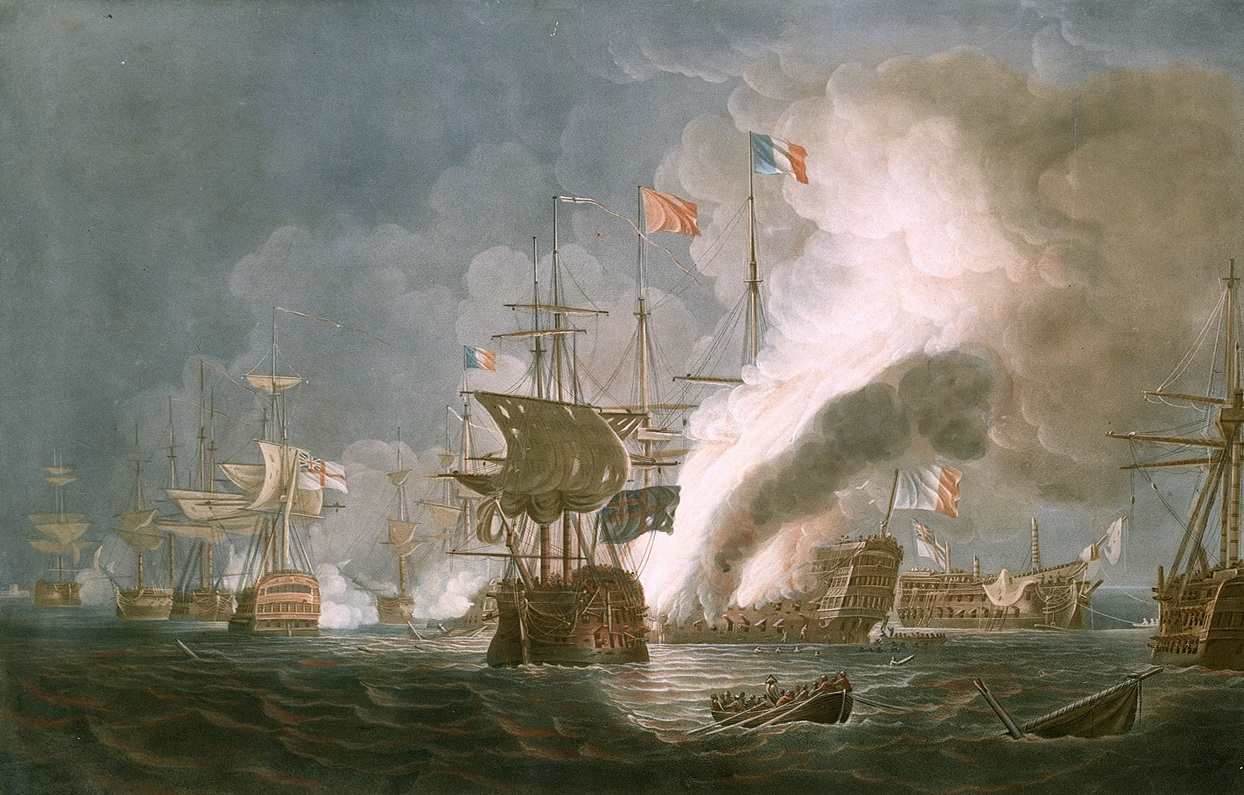
The Battle of the Nile, engraving by Thomas Whitcombe

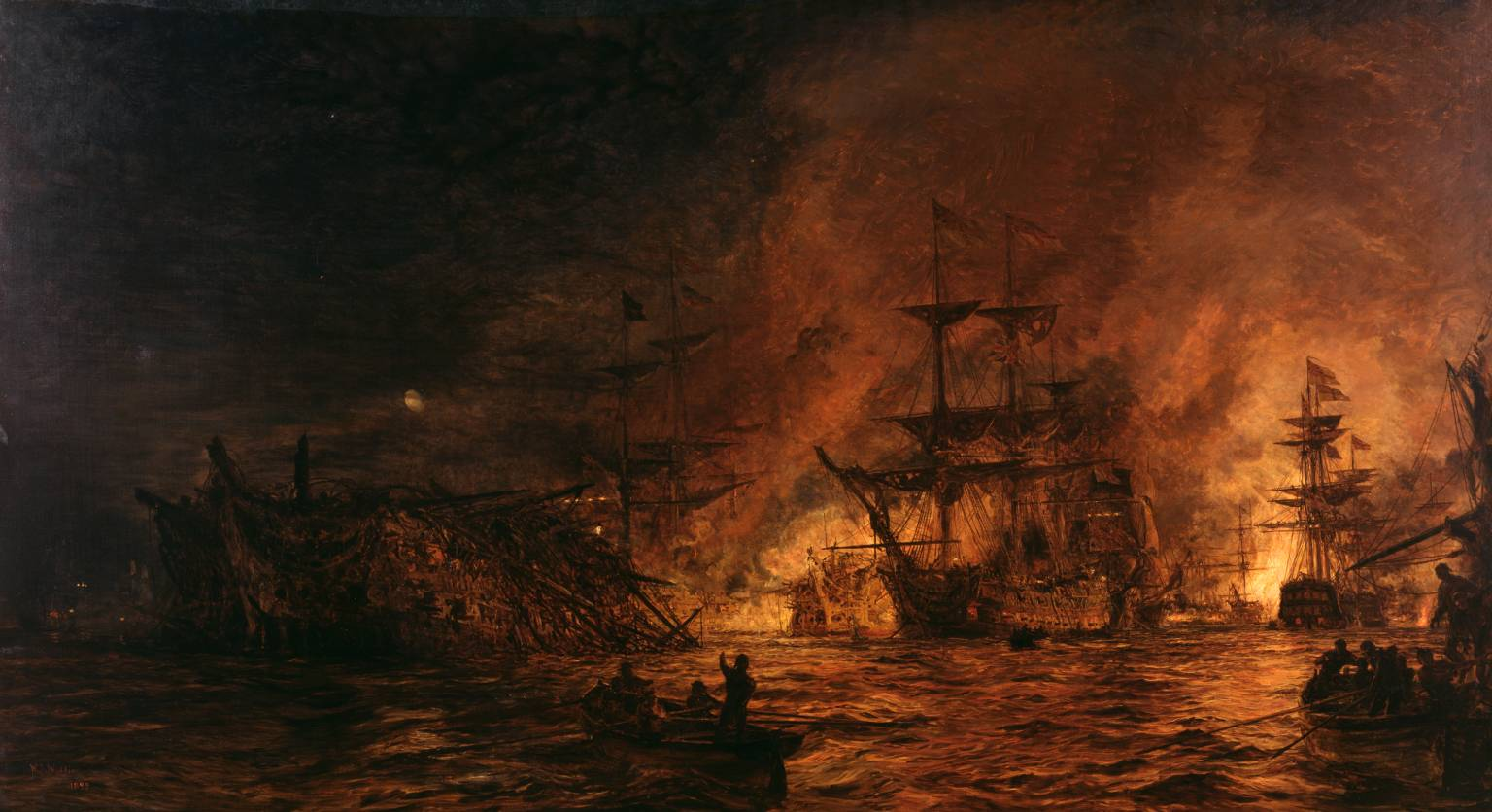
The Battle of the Nile, painting by William Lionel Wyllie

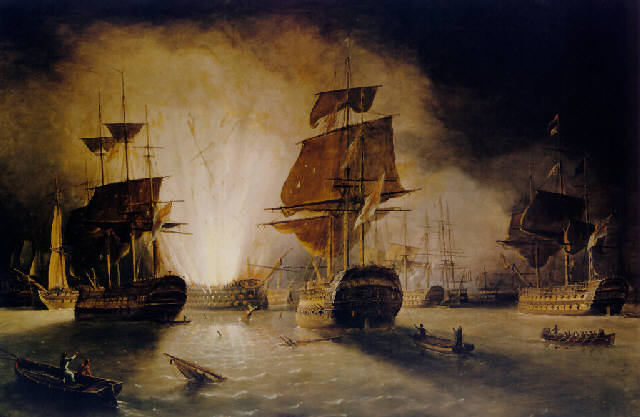
The Battle of the Nile, painting by Richard Brydges Beechey

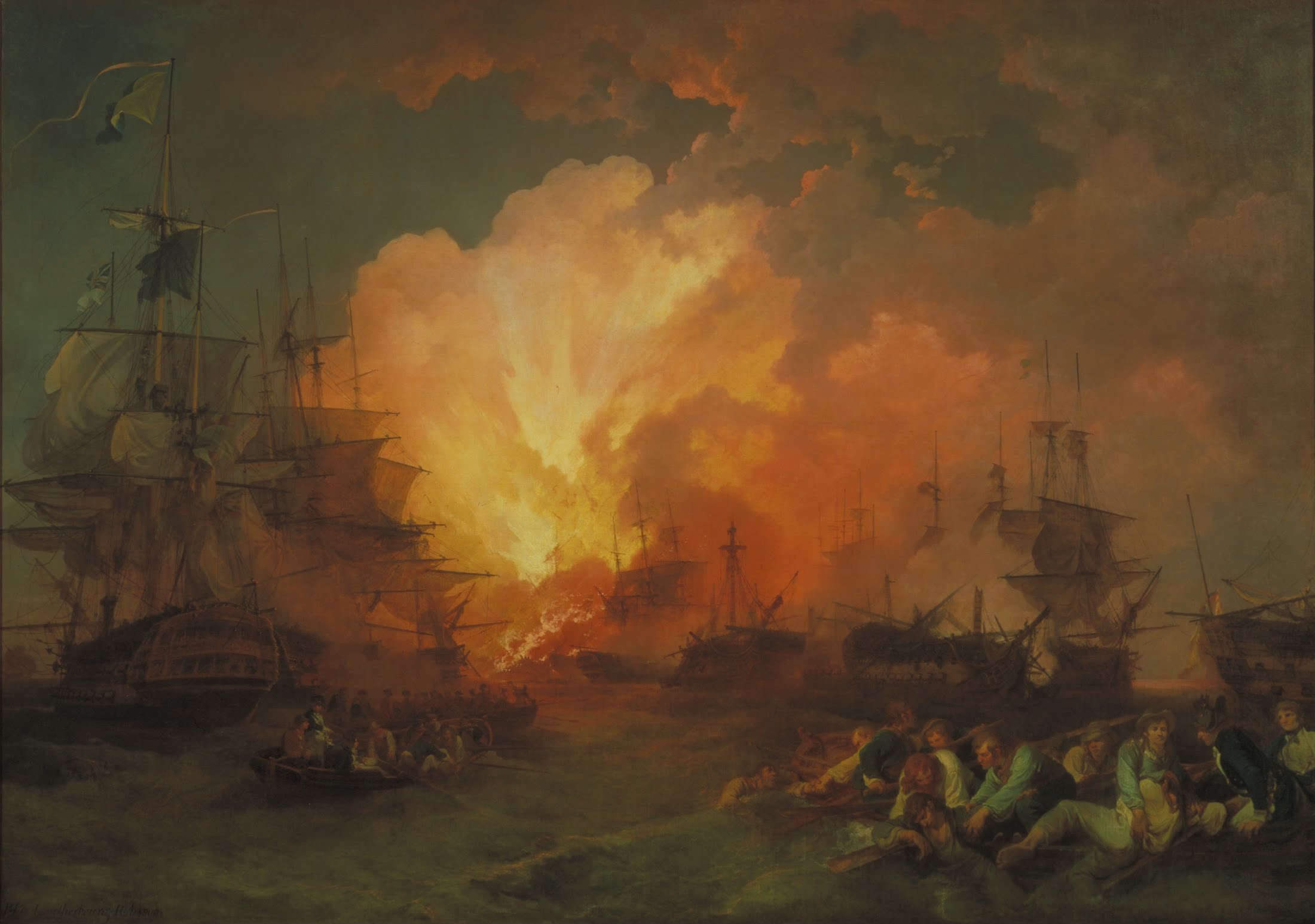
The Battle of the Nile, painting by Philip James de Loutherbourg, 1800

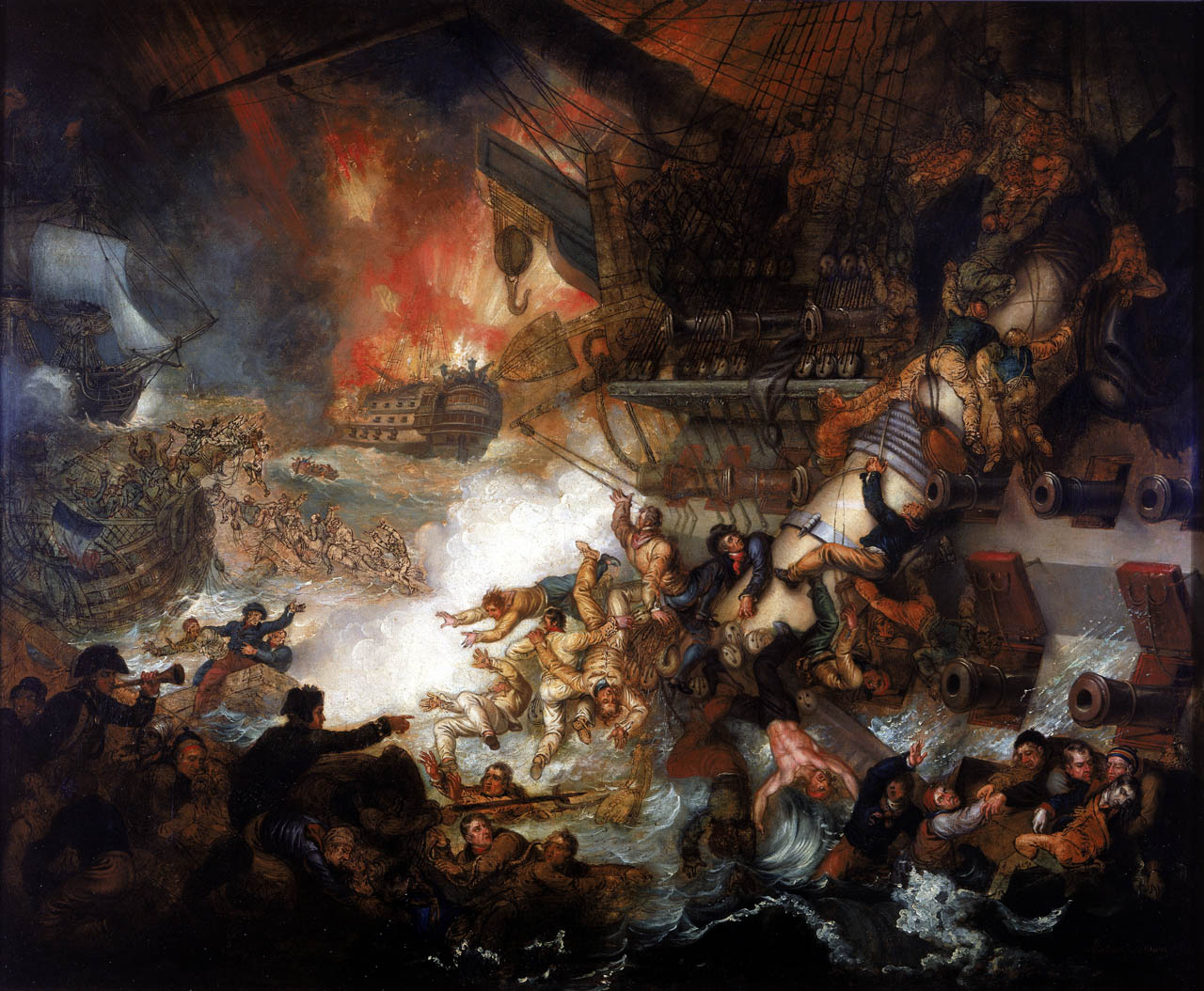
The Battle of the Nile, painting by Mather Brown, 1825

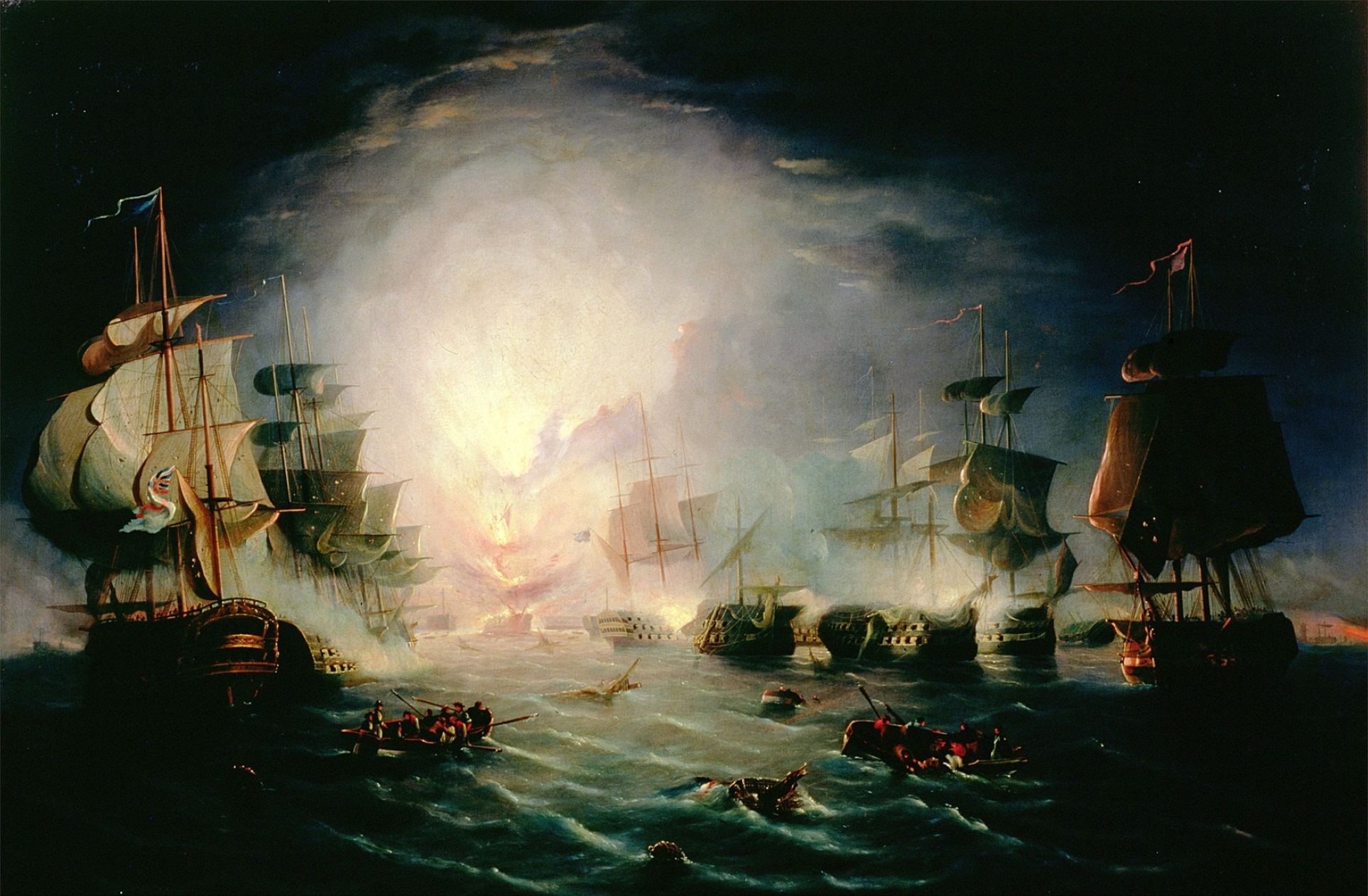
The blowing up of the French commander's ship "L'Orient" at the Battle of the Nile, 1798, painting by John Thomas Serres
