= Harriet Browne (composer) =

British music composer (1790–1858)

Harriet Mary Browne Owen (1798–1858) was an English writer and composer, the sister of poet Felicia Hemans. Browne was a granddaughter of the Venetian consul in Liverpool, and the family moved from there to Denbighshire in North Wales for her father to pursue his business. She grew up near Abergele and St. Asaph in Flintshire, and married a man named Owen. She was confused within her own lifetime with another composer, making attribution of her works difficult. Besides composing, she wrote a The works of Mrs. Hemans, with a memoir by her sister. She also used the pseudonym Mrs. Hughes.

== Works ==
Selected works include:

- The Pilgrim Fathers
- Oh! call my brother back to me (text Felicia Hemans)
