= St Thomas Cathedral, Acton =

Coordinates: 51.50838°N 0.24594°W

St Thomas Syriac Orthodox Cathedral
- Saint Thomas Syriac Orthodox Cathedral London
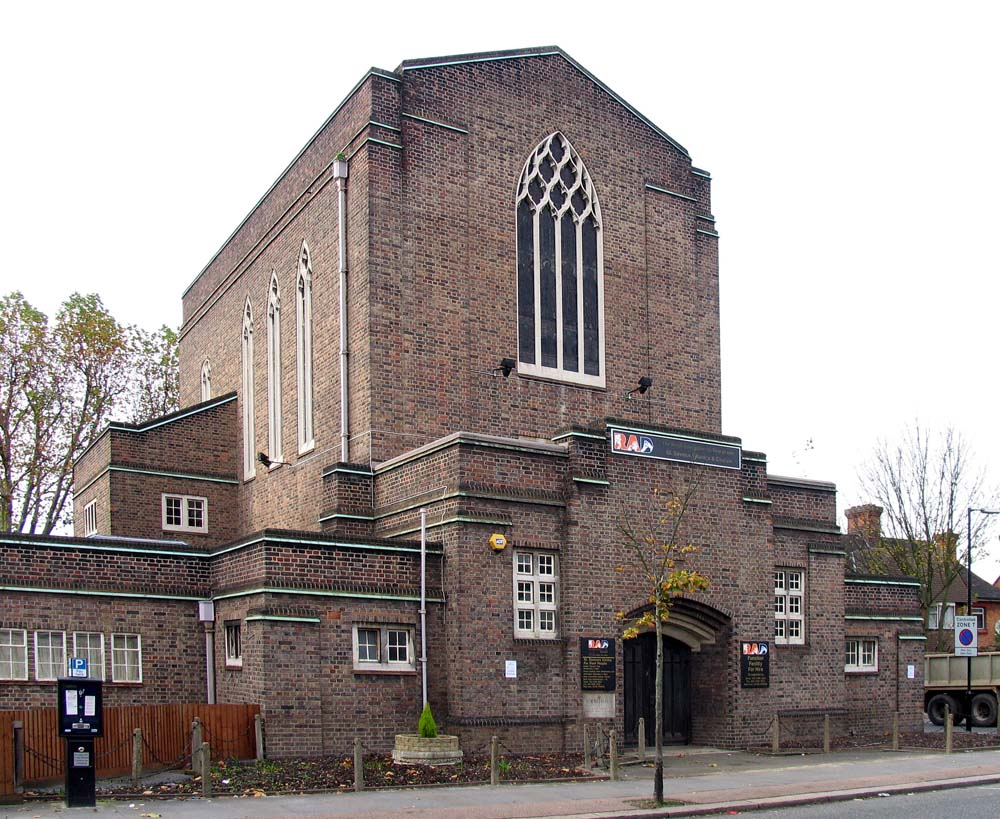
- St Thomas Syriac Orthodox Cathedral
- Location: Acton, London
- Country: England
- Denomination: Syriac Orthodox

History
- Former name: St Saviour's Centre for the Deaf
- Status: Church

St Thomas Syriac Orthodox Cathedral Acton is a Syriac Orthodox Cathedral in Acton, London, England, formerly known as St Saviour's Centre for the Deaf Anglican church, which was a social centre for deaf people, and the first and only purpose-built church for deaf people as such. St Saviour's was the central location for the London Diocesan Chaplaincy among Deaf and Deafblind people. The church and social centre closed in 2014 following a loss of funding, and insufficient financial reserves to maintain the premises. The final church service was held on Wednesday 24 September 2014, at which the Bishop of Willesden officiated.

On 25 November 2016, the cathedral was consecrated as a cathedral for the Syriac Orthodox Church, under the new name of St Thomas Syriac Orthodox Cathedral Acton. The ceremony was officiated by Syriac Patriarch of Antioch Ignatius Aphrem II, in the presence of the Prince of Wales (later King Charles III) and several senior representatives of the Church of England.

== History ==
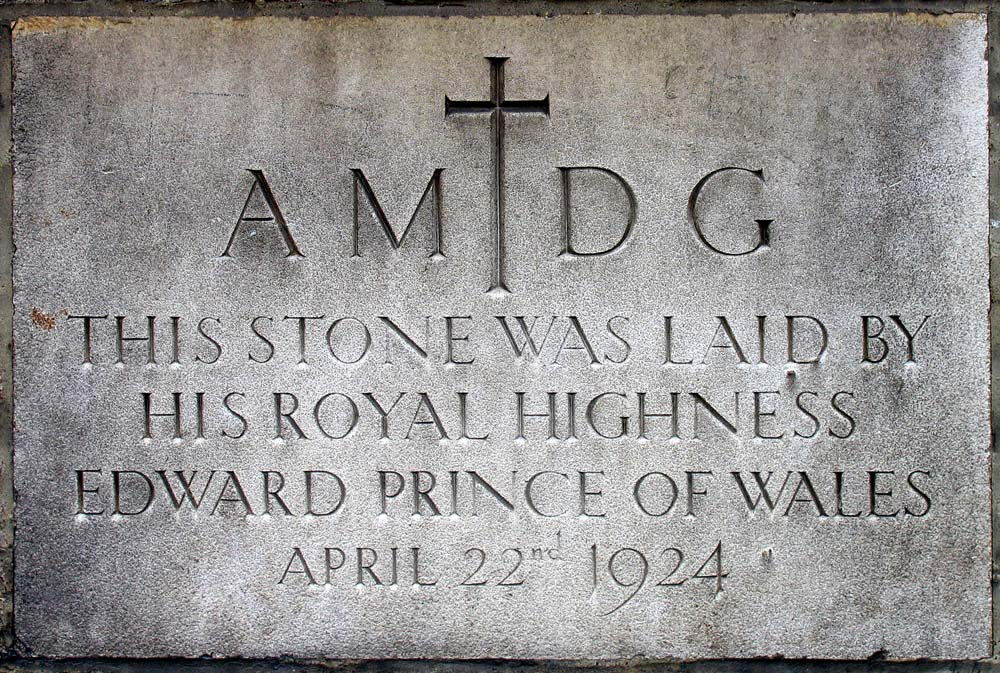
The foundation stone

=== St Saviour's Church, Oxford Street ===
The congregation was first established at a site in Oxford Street, where the original building was constructed from 1870 to 1874. The architect was Arthur Blomfield. The Duke of Westminster had provided the site on a lease for sixty years. The foundation stone was laid by Edward, Prince of Wales and Princess Alexandra, who had a hearing impairment.

The first service there was held in 1873. The building became a great symbol for deaf people of their rights to play a full part in church and society.

=== St Saviour's Church, Acton ===
The church moved to a new site in Acton in 1925, when the Oxford Street location was required for redevelopment into the present Selfridge's. The foundation stone of the new church was laid the previous year, once again by the Prince of Wales. The congregation worshipped in the church continuously for 90 years. The building included many features specially designed for the deaf, which included dual pulpits (one for the speaker and one for a sign language translator), clear lines of sight (with no pillars or visual obstructions), and a sloping floor to ensure that even those near the back can clearly see the signers.

The church and social centre closed in 2014 following a loss of funding, and insufficient financial reserves to maintain the premises. The final church service was held on Wednesday 24 September 2014, at which the Bishop of Willesden officiated.

St Thomas Syriac Orthodox Cathedral Acton

On 25 November 2016, the cathedral was consecrated as a cathedral for the Syriac Orthodox Church, under the new name of St Thomas Syriac Orthodox Cathedral Acton. The ceremony was officiated by Syriac Patriarch of Antioch Ignatius Aphrem II, at the presence of the Prince of Wales (now King Charles III) and several seniors of the Church of England.

== Deaf ministry ==
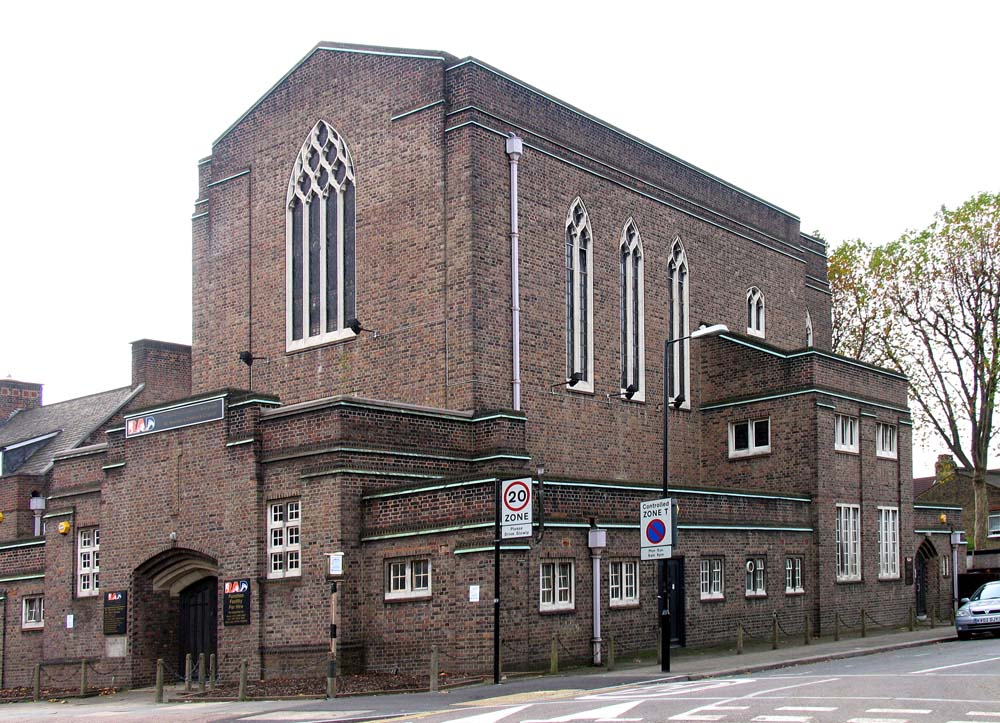
Another view of the church

Although St Saviour's Church has now closed, the congregation continues to meet. The Chaplaincy among Deaf and Deafblind people has four other meeting locations, although St Saviour's was the only dedicated premises, and the only church with specially designed facilities for the deaf. The closure of St Saviour's corresponds with the appointment of a new full-time Chaplain for the Chaplaincy service. Chaplains are ordained priests appointed to specialist ministries, in this case the provision of worship and social activities for the deaf and deafblind community in London.

== The church building ==
In September 2014, the Diocese of London announced that St Saviour's Church building had been sold to the Syriac Orthodox Church community in west London, who have developed it for continuing use as a church within their own tradition, reopening it as St Thomas Cathedral in November 2016, with the attendance of Charles, Prince of Wales and Ignatius Aphrem II.

Documents and archives associated with the church are currently being researched by the History of Place project, and will feature as part of a display at the Victoria and Albert Museum during 2018.
