= George Arnald =

English painter

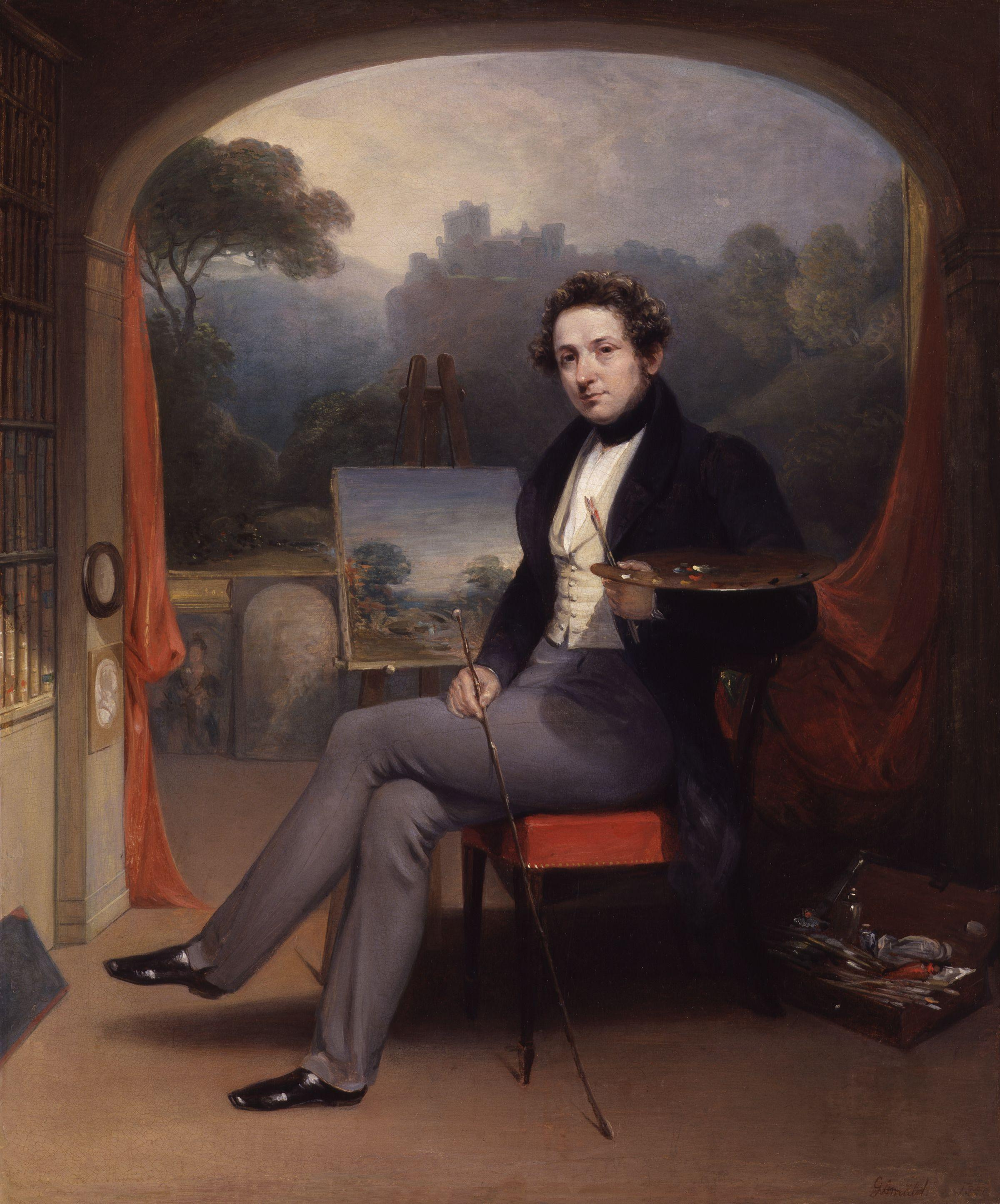
Selfportrait of George Arnald in his studio, 1831

George Arnald ARA (1763 – 21 November 1841) was a British painter who specialised in landscapes, including topographical views to illustrated county histories. He is best known for his celebrated painting depicting the Battle of the Nile.

== Biography ==
George Arnald was born in 1763. One account places his birth in the village of Farndip (now Farndish) in Northamptonshire (now Bedfordshire), although others suggest he was born in Berkshire.

There is little information about Arnald's early years, but it is believed that he began his working life as a domestic servant before turning to the study of art. He was a student of the landscape painter and engraver William Pether (c. 1738–1821).

Arnald first exhibited at the Royal Academy in 1788, and eventually had 176 works exhibited there. He also exhibited 63 works at the British Institution. He was elected an associate member of the Royal Academy on 5 November 1810, but was never admitted to full membership. Speaking to Sir George Beaumont, who was influential in the founding of the British Institution and the National Gallery, William Wordsworth lamented Arnald's lack of literary education, stating that he

"... would have been a better Painter, if his Genius had led him to read more in the early part of his life. . . . I do not think it possible to excel in landscape painting without a strong tincture of the Poetic Spirit.

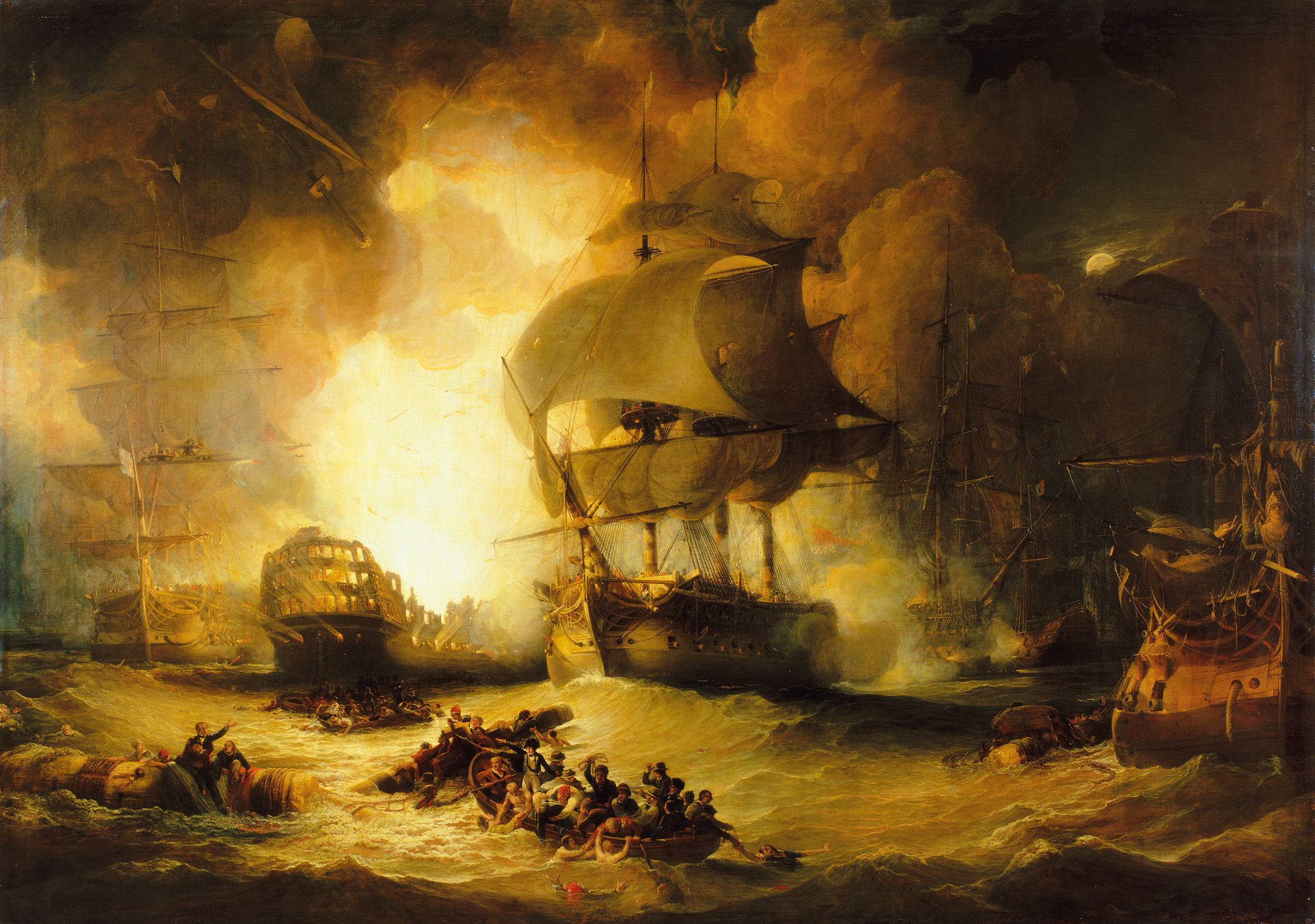
The Destruction of 'L'Orient' at the Battle of the Nile, 1 August 1798 by George Arnald, 1825–27. 1855 × 2690 mm

Probably his best-known and most acclaimed work was a departure from his usual subject-matter. The Destruction of L'Orient at the Battle of the Nile, 1 August 1798 is Arnald's only known maritime work, and was one of four paintings commissioned for £500 each as part of a British Institution competition for paintings to hang in the Painted Hall of Greenwich Hospital. It was exhibited at the British Institution in 1827 and is now displayed at the National Maritime Museum in Greenwich, London. It features as a "picture within a picture" in England's Pride and Glory by Thomas Davidson, hanging alongside the famous Lemuel Abbott portrait of Lord Nelson in the gallery at Greenwich Hospital.

Arnald was a friend of fellow painter John Varley, and in 1798 and 1799 the two toured Wales together. His students included the portrait painter Henry William Pickersgill, who became a full Royal Academician and whose eminent sitters included William Wordsworth, the Duke of Wellington and Sir Robert Peel.

In addition to providing illustrations for a number of books, Arnald published on his own an album of views on the River Meuse in 1828 [The river Meuse : being delineations of the picturesque scenery on the river and its banks, from the city of Liége to that of Mezières. The drawings were made ... in ... 1818 / and are etched by George Arnald, engraved in mezzotint by S. W. Reynolds, C. Turner, W. Ward ... , T. Lupton, H. Dawe, J. P. Quilley, etc. ... and other eminent engravers]. In 1839 he published A practical treatise on landscape painting in oil: illustrated by various diagrams and with two original studies in oil painted on the principles given in the treatise.

Arnald died in Pentonville, London on 21 November 1841.

== Work in public collections and galleries ==
Arnald's work features in collections including the Tate Collection, the Royal Academy of Arts Collection, the National Portrait Gallery, London, and the collections of the University of Liège in Belgium. The Ferens Art Gallery in Kingston upon Hull has his painting of Charles I before Hull, and his scene of The Army under Cromwell marching to Winchester is in Winchester City Museum.

== Book illustrations ==
Arnald's work was used to illustrate books, including the following:

- Scott, W. The Border Antiquities of England and Scotland. Edinburgh: 1814
- Dugdale, James. The New British Traveller. London: J Robins & Co, 1819
- Wright, Thomas. History and Topography of the County of Essex. London: G. Virtue, 1836
