= Legacy of Horatio Nelson, 1st Viscount Nelson =

Impact of British Royal Navy officer

England's Pride and Glory, an 1894 painting by Thomas Davidson. A young naval cadet is shown Lemuel Francis Abbott's portrait of Nelson to inspire him.

Horatio Nelson, 1st Viscount Nelson, 1st Duke of Bronté, KB (29 September 1758 – 21 October 1805) was one of the leading British flag officers in the Royal Navy of the French Revolutionary and Napoleonic Wars, responsible for several important victories over the French and Spanish navies during a time of crisis for the country. He was widely lauded for his success, and praised for his skill and daring. After his death during the Battle of Trafalgar, he became revered as a British hero, and his fame reached new heights. Large numbers of monuments and memorials have been created in his honour, and he has continued to influence British culture and society.

== Background ==
The French Revolution and the subsequent conflicts transformed the old systems of protocols of warfare. Whereas wars had previously been fought to inflict losses that would compel the enemy to seek peace, and concede some losses in the subsequent negotiations, it now became about destroying rival states and thoroughly subjugating them. The new Jacobin system terrified the property owning members of the British establishment, and resulted in a wave of patriotism, which manifested itself in the creation of a militarised society based on local militias and volunteer forces. With early French victories in the Low Countries, and large forces stationed at the Channel ports, there was the very real risk on invasion. For the first time since the Spanish Armada, Britain felt that it was in a war of national survival. Together the French and Spanish fleets considerably outnumbered the British. The Royal Navy was the main instrument of defence for the country, but it was a highly professionalised and modern service. In contrast, the French Navy was poorly led, early purges having cost a number of experienced officers and admirals, whilst the Spanish had a large force and skilled leaders, but few sailors. The Russian and Danish forces, while numerically significant, were vastly inferior in quality. But while the French Army was able to achieve a number of victories on land, the Royal Navy was able to harass French possessions, intercept French trade and capture French colonies. The expansion of the navy brought a number of officers and commanders to prominence, but none achieved the level of fame and adulation that Nelson secured.

== After Trafalgar ==
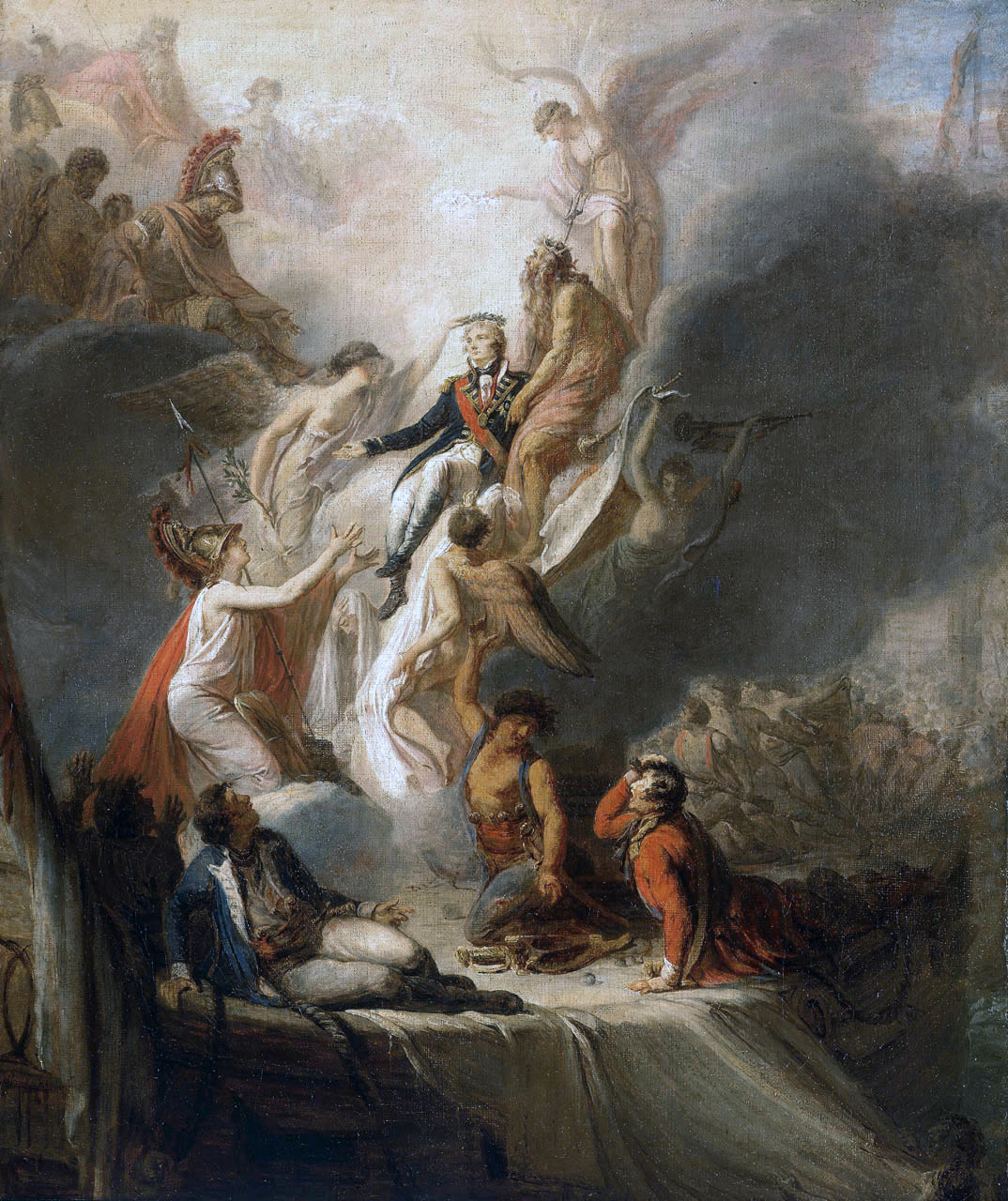
Scott Pierre Nicolas Legrand's Apotheosis of Nelson. Nelson ascends into immortality as the Battle of Trafalgar rages in the background. He is supported by Neptune, whilst Fame holds a crown of stars as a symbol of immortality over Nelson's head. A grieving Britannia holds out her arms, whilst Hercules, Mars, Minerva and Jupiter look on.

Nelson's death in the cockpit of his flagship HMS Victory has been described by Andrew Lambert as 'the ideal romantic death'. He was mortally wounded by an enemy sniper, dying slowly and remaining conscious throughout, surrounded by his chaplain and staff officers. His last thoughts covered matters such as final directions for his fleet, his hopes and fears for his family, and his personal desire for absolution and reassurance. The events were recorded by several of those present, including the surgeon, William Beatty, and later interpreted in dramatic paintings, both of the death scene, such as those by Benjamin West, and Arthur William Devis, and of allegorical depictions of Nelson's ascent into immortality as a result of his glorious death, including works by West, and Scott Legrand. When news arrived in Britain the initial joy at the news of the victory was stifled by the report of his death, and a state funeral was immediately planned. Nelson was to be buried in St Paul's Cathedral, in a grand ceremony that was not just a mere funeral but was intended to 'capture the essence, the spirit, and the name of Nelson for the nation.' A special coffin was devised, heavily decorated with emblems and symbols of Nelson's many victories. It enclosed the simpler coffin, given to Nelson by Benjamin Hallowell, and was itself enclosed in a grand sarcophagus made for Cardinal Wolsey. When Nelson was laid in state at Greenwich Hospital, a crowd of 30,000 arrived to pay their respects. The subsequent funeral was one of the grandest ever staged, costing some £14,000 and attended by large numbers of admirals, captains and members of royalty.

== Victorian era ==
By 1865, Nelson had been humanised by the British public, and his heroic status began to be reduced in comparison to newer military commanders, some of whom explicitly incorporated elements of Nelsonian tradition. The Franco-Prussian War reduced any potential threat that France might have offered, while the liberalising Prime Minister William Ewart Gladstone's policies saw the reduction of the navy as part of defence cuts. Gladstone's opponent, the Poet Laureate Alfred Tennyson, appealed to the image and tradition of Nelson, and stressed the importance of the Navy to the defence of the country. The 1890s saw another revival in interest, with several new biographies. Nelson featured in school text books as an idealised British hero, but the more controversial aspects of his life were ignored. In 1891 a grand exhibition of Nelson's life opened, and was visited by nearly two and half million people in the six months it was open for. The formation of the Navy League in 1894 gave added impetus to the movement to recognise Nelson's legacy, and grand celebrations were held in Trafalgar Square on Trafalgar Day, 1896.

== 20th century ==
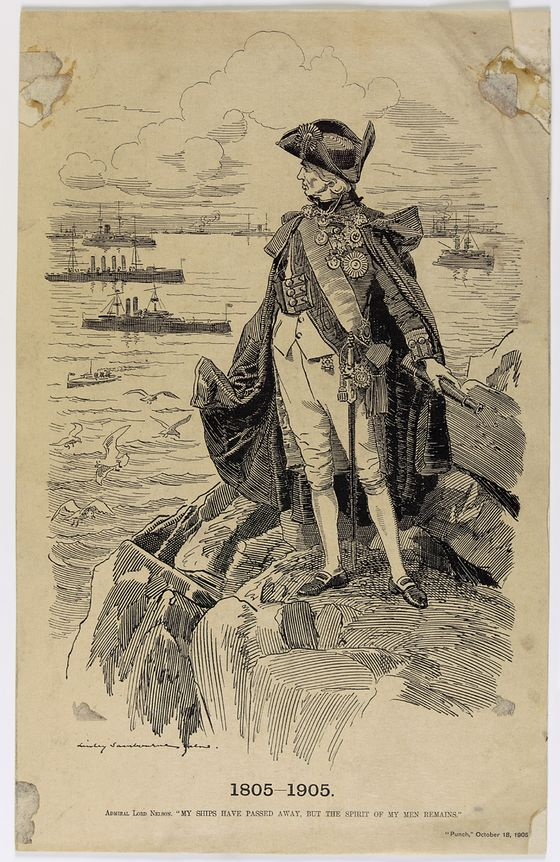
A 1905 cartoon from Punch. Nelson looks over the modern ships of the Royal Navy and says 'My ships have passed away, but the spirit of my men remains'. In the centenary of Nelson's death, leading figures in the Admiralty such as Lord Fisher stressed the legacy of Nelson.

The signing of the Triple Entente in 1904 led to a call for muted celebrations of the centenary of Trafalgar the following year to avoid offending the French. Some navy officers continued to emphasise the importance of Nelson, Jackie Fisher chose 21 October 1904 as the day to take up the office of First Sea Lord, and was fond of citing Nelson when implementing changes to the Navy. He also oversaw the naming of many navy ships after ships that had been at Trafalgar, or other Nelsonian battles, such as HMS Bellerophon, HMS Temeraire and HMS Superb; or after events or people in some way connected with him, such as HMS Collingwood and HMS St. Vincent. In many ways Fisher was preparing for a second Trafalgar. He had even selected a new Nelson to lead the new Nelsonian style navy, John Jellicoe, of whom he wrote

Sir John Jellicoe. Phenomenally young and junior. He will be Nelson at Cape St Vincent until he becomes "Boss" at Trafalgar when Armageddon comes along in 1915 or thereabouts - not sooner!

Nelson's legacy was also influential in the Second World War, inspiring Winston Churchill, who had written about him in his History of the English Speaking Peoples. Churchill kept a bust of Nelson in his study at Chartwell, and named his cat Nelson. He also declared That Hamilton Woman his favourite film, and often showed it to visiting naval officers. The example of Nelson inspired the population as a whole, and a number of Nelsonian biographies were reprinted during the war. The post war era saw the decline of British power, which had been pre-eminent since Nelson's time. Despite a large new biography by Carola Oman in 1946, the figure of Nelson seemed out of touch with post war austerity.

However, Nelson's legacy has endured. In the BBC's 100 Greatest Britons programme in 2002, Nelson was voted the 9th greatest Briton of all time. The bicentenary of the Battle of Trafalgar in 2005 led to a round of celebrations under the banner of 'Trafalgar 200'. An International Fleet Review was held, and several new biographies and histories of the battle were published. Phrases such as "England expects" and "nelson" (meaning "111") continue to remain closely associated with English sporting teams, especially cricket.

== Depictions ==
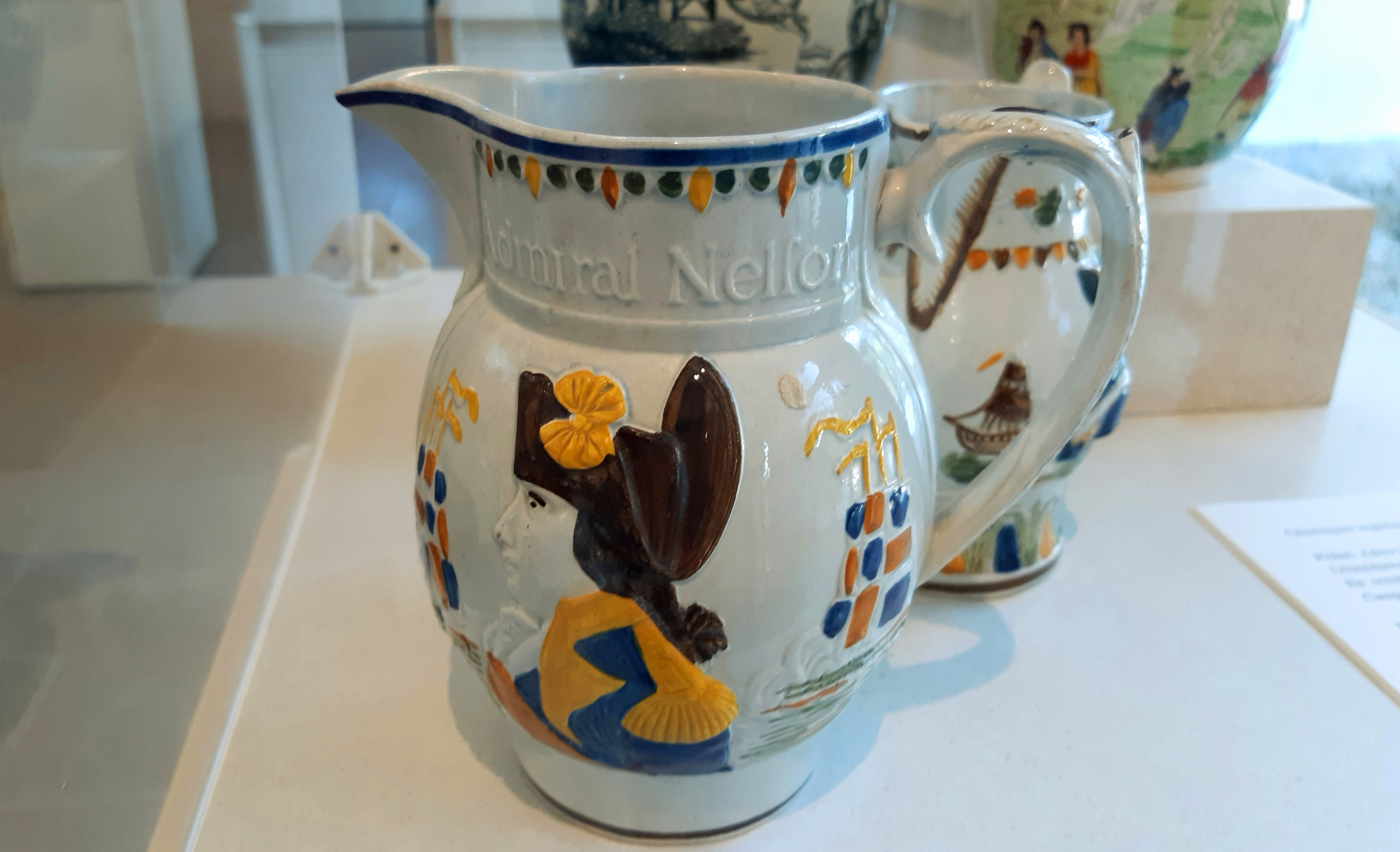
Pitcher decorated with Admiral Nelson, 1795, Musée de la Révolution française.

=== Art ===
After the arrival of Victory at Portsmouth, large numbers of artists arrived to prepare sketches for their interpretations of the battle, and Nelson's death. Arthur William Devis and Benjamin West competed to create the grandest scene of the death, with West also painting his Apotheosis of Nelson. J. M. W. Turner also visited the Victory to gather material for his paintings of the battle. The caricaturist James Gilray produced some of the earliest works in the aftermath of the battle, but his works were considerably more respectful than many of his satirical attacks on public figures. A large number of prints were also quickly produced to capitalised on public interest. In the 1840s Prince Albert became interested in naval history, and commissioned several works, including ones depicting Nelson's victories, for the Royal palaces. Daniel Maclise duly designed and painted an enormous fresco for the Royal Gallery at Westminster.

=== Literature ===
Hastily written tributes appeared across the country immediately after the news arrived, in papers, pamphlets and books. Samuel Taylor Coleridge, then at Naples, produced an obituary essay on the death of Alexander Ball, one of Nelson's captains whom he had known, and commented on Nelson's qualities. An official biography was written by John McArthur and James Stanier Clarke and published in 1809. This was followed by a work by Robert Southey in 1813, and Lord Byron wrote in his 1819 poem Don Juan that 'Nelson was Britannia's god of war'. In the 1840s Nicholas Harris Nicolas drew up and published Nelson's collected correspondence. Thomas Carlyle's earliest works included a brief biographical sketch of Nelson, labeling him a hero. Thomas Pettigrew, capitalising on a resurgence of interest in Nelson, produced a new biography in the 1840s. Herman Melville references Nelson many times throughout his works, including Omoo (Chs. 15,29), Mardi (Chs. 24,30), Redburn (Chs. 29, 31, 32, 36, 41), White-Jacket (Chs. 6, 16, 27, 36, 38, 50, 52, 68, 74, 75), Moby-Dick (Chs. 8,35), and Billy Budd (Ch. 4). J. K. Laughton produced several works on Nelson in the late 19th century, and in 1897 Alfred Thayer Mahan published his Life of Nelson, which rapidly became a best seller.

=== Monuments ===
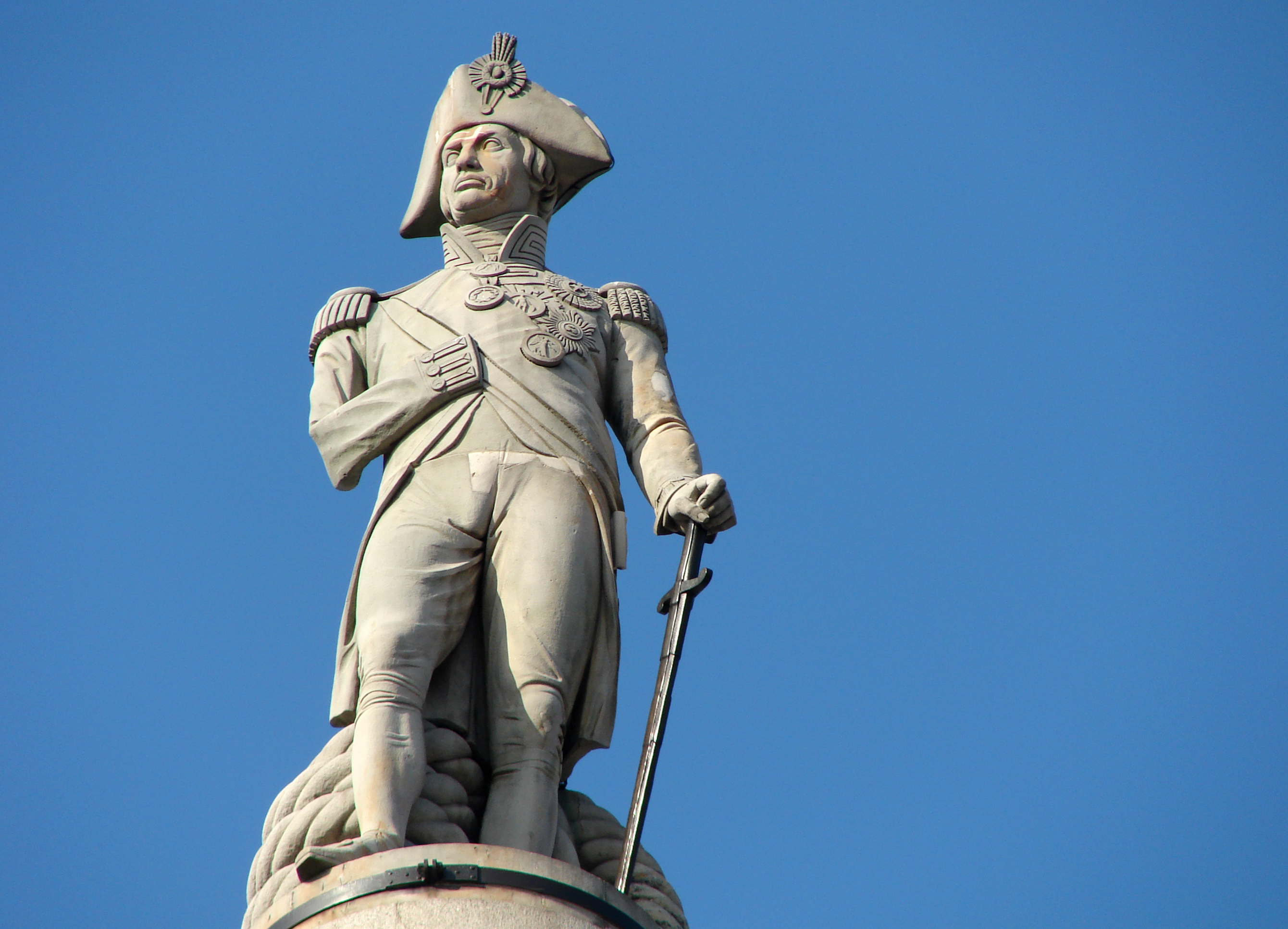
Nelson's Column was created to honour Nelson, and deliberately drew parallels with Roman monuments.

Dublin was the first city to create its own monument to Nelson, with work beginning on Nelson's Pillar in 1808. Liverpool followed suit in 1813, and soon monuments had been erected in cities across the empire, including the Norfolk town on Great Yarmouth in 1819. The possibility of a memorial in London had been discussed in 1816, but it was not until the 1830s that a programme of slum clearance created a suitable location, which was renamed Trafalgar Square in 1835. The column itself was designed by William Railton and modelled on a column in the Temple of Mars Ultor, in Rome. The Temple had been built to celebrate the transformation of the late military leader Julius Caesar into a god. The treatment accorded to Nelson established clear parallels, and compared the triumph of the Roman Empire with the triumph of the British over the French. The square and column were completed by 1843, with the final addition of Sir Edwin Landseer's lions coming several years later.

=== Music ===
John Braham's song, The Death of Nelson, written immediately after Trafalgar, became extremely popular. Lennox Berkeley's opera Nelson premièred in 1954. Joseph Haydn's Missa in Angustiis is popularly known as the Nelson Mass. Nelson "on board of the Victory" is also mentioned at the beginning the song "If you Want a Receipt for that Popular Mystery" sung by Colonel Calverley in the operetta Patience by Gilbert and Sullivan.

=== Nelson in contemporary fiction ===
Nelson appears in Susan Sontag's novel The Volcano Lover: A Romance, and as a ghost in Amber Benson's and Christopher Golden's Ghosts of Albion. He appears several times in Dudley Pope's Ramage series, and features in Sharpe's Trafalgar by Bernard Cornwell. Nelson is the object of the ardent admiration of Captain Jack Aubrey in Patrick O'Brian's Aubrey–Maturin series. In James Joyce's Ulysses, Nelson is referred to by the character Stephen Dedalus as the 'one-handled adulterer', when speaking of his namesake monument, Nelson's Pillar. Nelson features in James A Michener's Caribbean, and is referred to in Barry Unsworth's novel Losing Nelson. Naomi Novik's alternate history/fantasy Temeraire series suggests an alternate future in which Nelson survives Trafalgar. A recently discovered Alexandre Dumas novel, The Knight of Sainte-Hermine, portrays the title character as the shooter of Nelson. The character of Horatio Hornblower in C. S. Forester's series of books was partially inspired by Nelson. Lennox Berkeley's opera Nelson premièred in 1954. Nelson also has cameos in the historical fiction of William C. Hammond.

Nelson was portrayed on film by Laurence Olivier in That Hamilton Woman (1941), and also in the film The Young Mr. Pitt. Peter Finch portrayed him in a 1973 film adaptation of Terence Rattigan's 1970 stage play A Bequest to the Nation. Nelson also appears as a minor character in Abel Gance's Austerlitz (1960). In the 1961 television series, Triton, Nelson was played by Robert James, and in a 1968 version of the same series, he was played by Terry Scully.

Lord Nelson's cultus was repeatedly lampooned in the 1980s sitcom Blackadder the Third. In the episode Ink and Incapability, the show's antihero, Mr. E. Blackadder, mocks Nelson's famous signal at the Battle of Trafalgar. He announces that Nelson used a similar signal at the Battle of the Nile: "England knows Lady Hamilton is a virgin. Poke my eye out and cut off my arm if I'm wrong."

Lord Nelson also appears in the Georgian segment of Blackadder's Christmas Carol at a party hosted by the Prince Regent. Passed out from too much alcohol, Nelson suddenly awakens and screams that he has gone blind. Then, however, Blackadder reveals to Nelson that his eyepatch is simply on backwards. Relieved, Nelson returns to a drunken stupor.

In Sid Meier's Civilization VI, players can recruit Nelson as a Great Admiral.

== Nelson and the Royal Navy ==
The Royal Navy have named a number of ships after Nelson or his victories. These have included HMS Nelson, HMS Lord Nelson, HMS Nile and HMS Trafalgar. The Royal Navy celebrates Nelson every 21 October by holding Trafalgar Night dinners and toasting "The Immortal Memory" of Nelson. His flagship Victory is still kept on active commission in honour of Nelson — it is the flagship of the First Sea Lord, and is the oldest commissioned Naval ship in the world. She can be found in Number 2 Dry Dock of the Royal Naval Museum at the Portsmouth Naval Base, in Portsmouth, which is named HMS Nelson. The Victory was drydocked for restoration in 1922, and opened to the public as a shrine to Nelson and his navy in 1928.

== Nelsonia ==
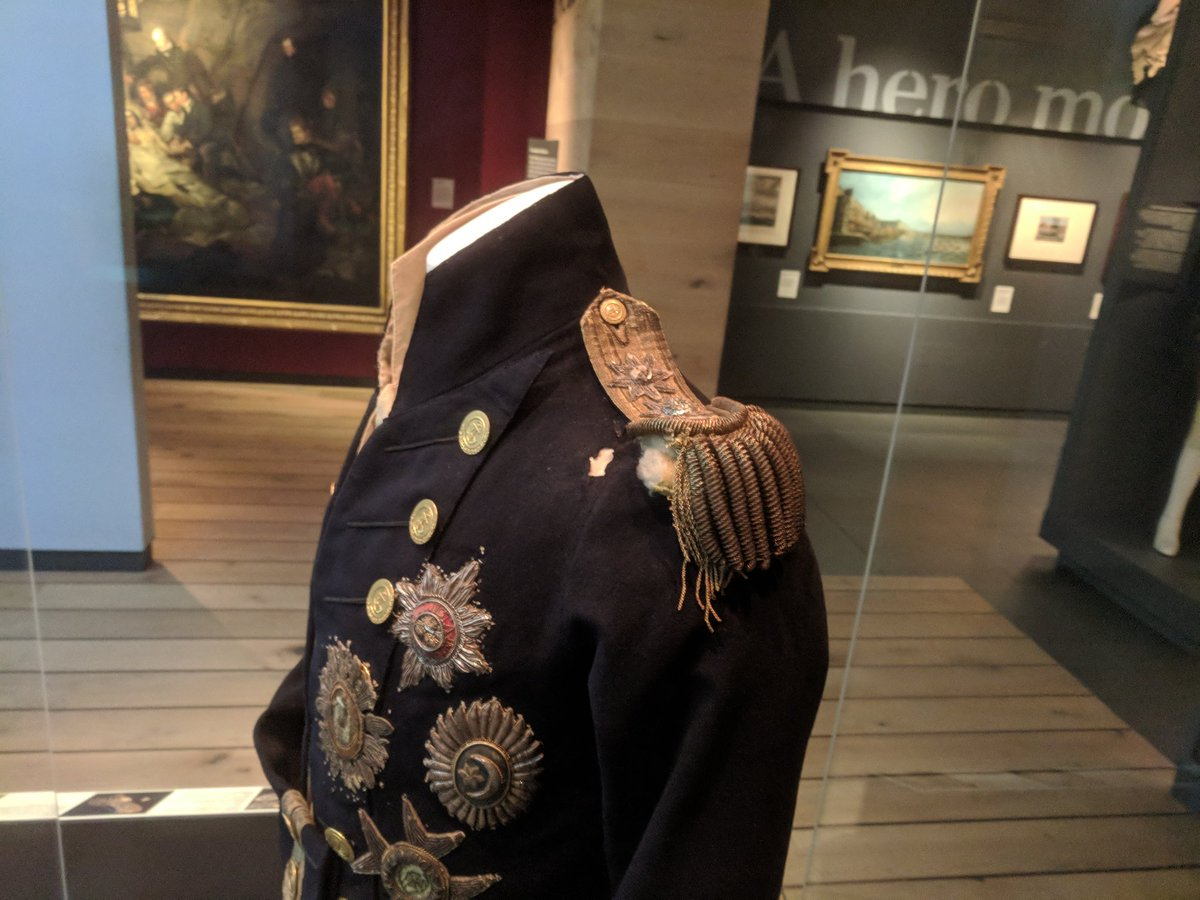
Uniform coat worn by Nelson at Trafalgar, with bullet hole in left shoulder

The bullet that killed Nelson is on display in the Queen's Guard Chamber of Windsor Castle; the surgeon William Beatty on Victory had performed an autopsy, removing the musket ball. The uniform that he wore during the battle, with the fatal bullet hole still visible, can be seen at the National Maritime Museum in Greenwich. A lock of Nelson's hair was given to the Imperial Japanese Navy from the Royal Navy after the Russo-Japanese War to commemorate the victory at the Battle of Tsushima. It is still on display at the Edashima Naval Academy, a public museum maintained by the Japan Self-Defense Forces. Another may be seen in the dining room of the museum ship HMY Britannia, the former royal yacht, now permanently moored near Edinburgh, Scotland.

== See also ==
- List of places named after Horatio Nelson
