= List of places named after Horatio Nelson =

This is a list of places named after Horatio Nelson (Lord Nelson) (1758-1805), the British admiral.

== Populated places ==
- Fort Nelson, British Columbia, Canada
- Nelson, New Zealand
- Nelson, Lancashire, England, named after a public house, itself named after Lord Nelson
- Nelson, Caerphilly, Wales, a village named after a public house, itself named after Lord Nelson
- Nelson, New Hampshire
- Nelson, New York

== Geographic features ==
- Mount Nelson, British Columbia, Canada
- Nelson Head, Northwest Territories, Canada
- Nelson Island (British Columbia), Canada
- Nelson's Island, Egypt

== Roads and streets ==
- Nelson Street, Hong Kong
- Nelson Road, Southampton, England

== Historic sites ==
- Nelson's Dockyard, Antigua
- Lord Nelson Hotel, Halifax, Nova Scotia, Canada
- Fort Nelson, Hampshire, England
- Nelson Place West, Bath, England
- Nelson Garden, Monmouth, Wales
- Belmond Mount Nelson Hotel, Cape Town, South Africa

== See also ==
- HMS Nelson
- HMS Lord Nelson
