= Iphigenia in Aulis =

Last extant work of Greek playwright Euripides

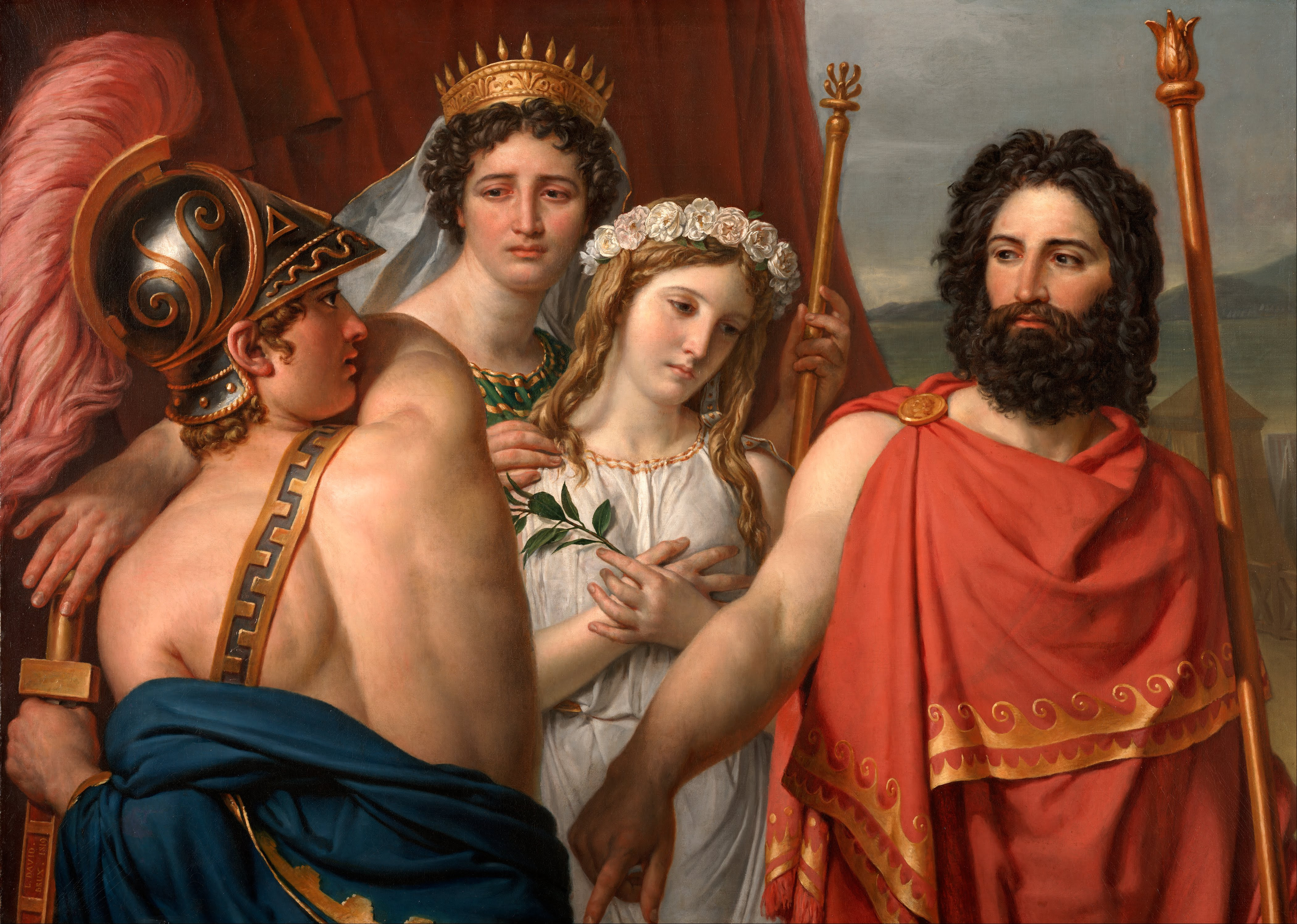
- The Anger of Achilles by Jacques-Louis David
- Original language: Ancient Greek
- Written by: Euripides
- Chorus: Greek Women of Chalcis
- Characters: Agamemnon; Old servant Menelaus; First Messenger; Clytemnestra; Iphigenia; Achilles; Second Messenger
- Genre: Tragedy
- Setting: Port of Aulis

Premiere
- Date: 405 BC
- Place: Athens

Iphigenia in Aulis or Iphigenia at Aulis (Ancient Greek: Ἰφιγένεια ἐν Αὐλίδι, romanized: Īphigéneia en Aulídi; variously translated, including the Latin Iphigenia in Aulide) is the last of the extant works by the playwright Euripides. Written between 408, after Orestes, and 406 BC, the year of Euripides' death, the play was first produced the following year in a trilogy with The Bacchae and Alcmaeon in Corinth by his son or nephew, Euripides the Younger, and won first place at the City Dionysia in Athens.

Set prior to the commencement of the Trojan War, Iphigenia at Aulis revolves around the strong resistance by Clytemnestra to the decision of her husband, Agamemnon, the leader of the Greek coalition before and during the Trojan War, to ritually sacrifice and kill his daughter, Iphigenia, to appease the goddess Artemis. This would allow his troops to set sail to preserve their honour in order to battle and ultimately sack Troy, actions which would result in the killing of all of Troy's men and the enslavement of all of its women by Agamemnon and the Greek men. These latter events are central to several of the Greek tragedies such as Euripides' Hecuba and The Trojan Women, as well as Aeschylus' play Agamemnon.

The conflict in Iphigenia at Aulis also focuses closely on Iphigenia's initial resistance to the idea of dying/being killed and her relationship with her father and, to a lesser degree, on a young Achilles, who is drawn into the situation by Agamemnon. Also known to the audience of Athenians who witnessed the play's performance would have been the fact that, as a result of Agamemnon's actions, after the war he will be killed upon his homecoming by his wife, Clytemnestra, and that she in turn will be killed by her son, Orestes, in order to avenge his father. All appear in Iphigenia at Aulis.

== Background ==
The Greek fleet is waiting at Aulis, Boeotia, with its ships ready to sail for Troy, but is unable to depart due to a strange lack of wind. After consulting the seer Calchas, the Greek leaders learn that this is no mere meteorological abnormality but rather the will of the goddess Artemis, who is withholding the winds because Agamemnon has offended her because his men have killed a sacred stag.

Calchas informs the general that in order to appease the goddess, he must sacrifice his eldest daughter, Iphigenia. Agamemnon, in spite of his horror, must consider this seriously because his assembled troops, who have been waiting on the beach and are increasingly restless, may rebel if the delay continues. He sends a message to his wife, Clytemnestra, telling her to send Iphigenia to Aulis on the pretext that the girl is to be married to the Greek warrior Achilles before he sets off to fight.

== Plot ==
At the start of the play, Agamemnon has second thoughts about going through with the sacrifice and sends a second message to his wife, telling her to ignore the first. Clytemnestra never receives it, however, because it is intercepted by Menelaus, Agamemnon's brother, who is enraged over his change of heart.

To Menelaus, this is not only a personal blow (for it is his wife, Helen, with whom the Trojan prince Paris ran off, and whose retrieval is the main pretext for the war), it may also lead to mutiny and the downfall of the Greek leaders should the rank and file discover the prophecy and realise that their general has put his family above their pride as soldiers.

The brothers debate the matter and, eventually, each seemingly changes the other's mind. Menelaus is apparently convinced that it would be better to disband the Greek army than to have his niece killed, but Agamemnon is now ready to carry out the sacrifice, claiming that the army will storm his palace at Argos and kill his entire family if he does not. By this time, Clytemnestra is already on her way to Aulis with Iphigenia and her baby brother Orestes, making the decision of how to proceed all the more difficult.

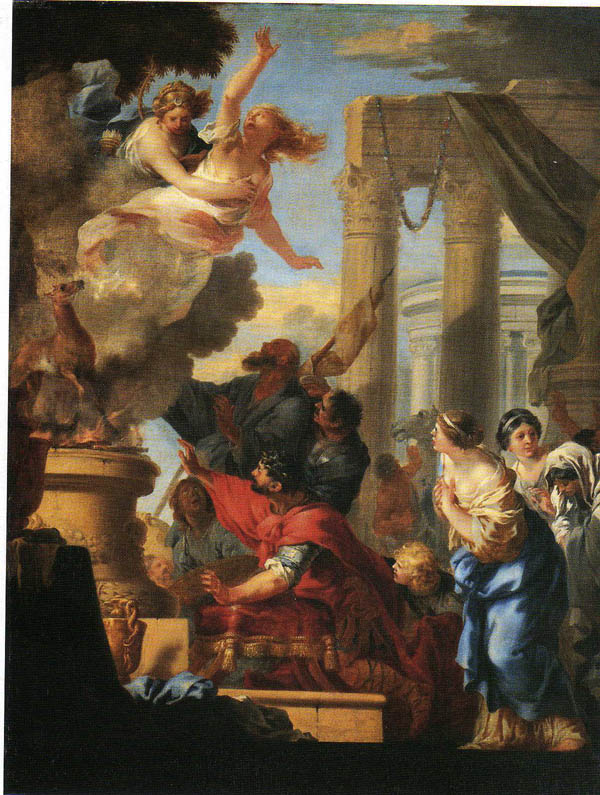
The Sacrifice of Iphigeneia (1653) by Sébastien Bourdon

Iphigenia is thrilled at the prospect of marrying one of the great heroes of the Greek army, but she, her mother, and the ostensible groom-to-be soon discover the truth. Furious at having been used as a prop in Agamemnon's plan, Achilles vows to defend Iphigenia, initially more for the purposes of his own honour than to save the innocent girl. However, when he tries to rally the Greeks against the sacrifice, he finds out that "the entirety of Greece"—including the Myrmidons under his personal command—demand that Agamemnon's wishes be carried out, and he barely escapes being stoned.

Clytemnestra and Iphigenia try in vain to persuade Agamemnon to change his mind, but the general believes that he has no choice. As Achilles prepares to defend Iphigenia by force, Iphigenia, realizing that she has no hope of escape, begs Achilles not to throw his life away in a lost cause. Over her mother's protests and to Achilles's admiration, she consents to her sacrifice, declaring that she would rather die heroically, winning renown as the savior of Greece, than be dragged unwilling to the altar. Leading the chorus in a hymn to Artemis, she goes to her death, with her mother Clytemnestra so distraught as to presage her murder of her husband and Orestes's matricide years later.

The play as it exists in the manuscripts ends with a messenger reporting that Iphigenia has been replaced on the altar by a deer. It is, however, generally considered that this is not an authentic part of Euripides' original text. "Paley agrees with Porson in regarding the rest of the play after Iphigenia's exit [lines 1510 to the end of the play] as the work of an interpolator". A fragment of the play may indicate that Artemis appeared to console Clytemnestra and assure her that her daughter had not been sacrificed after all, but if this is a surviving reference to Euripides' original ending, that ending is not extant.

== Associated myths ==
The first lines of the Chorus (Women of Chalcis) are:

"To the sandy beach of sea-coast Aulis I came after a voyage through the tides of Euripus, leaving Chalcis on its narrow firth, my city which feedeth the waters of far famed Arethusa near the sea,..."

About the Arethusa myth:

"The Sicilian well Arethusa, ...was believed to have a subterraneous communication with the river Alpheius, in Peloponnesus. According to Pausanias, Alpheius was a passionate hunter and fell in love with the nymph Arethusa, but she fled from him to the island of Ortygia near Syracuse, and metamorphosed herself into a well, whereupon Alpheius became a river, which flowing from Peloponnesus under the sea to Ortygia, there united its waters with those of the well Arethusa. This story is related somewhat differently by Ovid. Arethusa, a fair nymph, once while bathing in the river Alpheius in Arcadia, was surprised and pursued by the god; but Artemis took pity upon her and changed her into a well, which flowed under the earth to the island of Ortygia."

== Cultural influence ==
The play inspired the tragedy Iphigénie (1674) by Jean Racine and was the basis of several operas in the eighteenth century, using librettos that drew from both Euripedes's and Racine's versions and had various plot variants. The earliest extant libretto is by Christian Heinrich Postel, Die wunderbar errettete Iphigenia, set by Reinhard Keiser in 1699. The most popular libretto was Apostolo Zeno's Ifigenia in Aulide (1718), set by Antonio Caldara (1718), Giuseppe Maria Orlandini (1732), Giovanni Porta (1738), Nicola Porpora (1735), Girolamo Abos (1752), Giuseppe Sarti (1777), Angelo Tarchi (1785), and Giuseppe Giordani (1786). Other libretti include Ifigenia by Matteo Verazi (set by Niccolò Jommelli, 1751), that of Vittorio Amadeo Cigna-Santi (set by Ferdinando Bertoni, 1762 and Carlo Franchi, 1766), that of Luigi Serio (set by Vicente Martín y Soler, 1779 and Alessio Prati, 1784), and that of Ferdinando Moretti (set by Niccolò Antonio Zingarelli, 1787 and Luigi Cherubini, 1788). However, the best-known opera today is Christoph Willibald Gluck's Iphigénie en Aulide (1774).

Iphigenia in Aulis has had a significant influence on modern art. Greek director Michael Cacoyannis based his 1977 film Iphigenia (starring Irene Papas as Clytemnestra) on Euripides's script. The play also formed the basis for the 2003 novel The Songs of the Kings by Barry Unsworth, as well as the P. D. Q. Bach cantata Iphigenia in Brooklyn. Neil LaBute drew heavily on the story of Iphigenia for his short play Iphigenia in Orem, one of his Bash series.

US Latina playwright Caridad Svich's 2004 multimedia play Iphigenia Crash Land Falls on the Neon Shell That Was Once Her Heart (a rave fable) is published in the international theatre journal TheatreForum, and also in the anthology Divine Fire: Eight Contemporary Plays Inspired by the Greeks published in 2005 by BackStage Books. The play re-sets Iphigenia's story in and around Ciudad Juárez and the murders of the Women of Juárez.

Charles L. Mee, an American playwright, adapted the text for the modern theatre through his project, "The Re-Making Project". Mee's "Iphigenia 2.0", which was inspired by Euripides's Iphigenia in Aulis, incorporates some texts from Alan Stuart-Smyth, Jim Graves, Jim Morris, Gaby Bashan, Richard Holmes, Richard Heckler, Dave Grossman, Wilfred Owen, and Anthony Swofford. The New York World Premiere of this version of "Iphigenia 2.0" was originally produced by Signature Theatre Company, New York City, and was described in the New York Times review as a "proudly unfaithful and rather tedious version of Euripides' 'Iphigenia at Aulis.'"

The book Iphigenia in Splott by Gary Owen was based on Ipigenia in Aulis, transposed to early 21st century Cardiff. It was later produced as a one-woman play that won the Best New Play at the UK Theatre Awards in 2015. This was further re-worked as the Welsh-language film Effi o Blaenau, directed by Marc Evans with Leisa Gwenllian as Effi.

Greek director Yorgos Lanthimos based his 2017 film The Killing of a Sacred Deer loosely on the story of Agamemnon.

Image Comics plans a graphic novel version of the play to be released in May 2022, written by Edward Einhorn and with art by Eric Shanower.

== Themes ==
Gender Roles: The role of gender in Iphigenia in Aulis becomes very clear as the work progresses. Ancient Greek culture is very male-dominated, with a majority of Greek warriors and heroes being of that gender. Women in Greek culture had no political rights or rights over their own bodies - their job was to bear children and listen to their husbands (or their fathers, if they are unmarried). In Iphigenia in Aulis, Iphigenia herself makes this difference very clear. Iphigenia's father, Agamemnon, summons her to Aulis, under the false guise that she is to marry one of the heroes there, Achilles. As a woman, she herself has no true choice in who she marries, as it is her father's job to select and approve of a man for her marriage. Even when Achilles and Agamemnon reveal the truth, Iphigenia knows that she has no choice, so she is forced to beg her father to change his mind. Eventually, she concludes that her sacrifice would be worth the furthering of the war. She herself notes that it would be "better" her life than the life of all the soldiers gathered there, as a woman's life bears a lot less value than the life of a man. She feels obligated to make the decision she makes because of the subservient role she is expected to play to the men in her life. Euripides' Iphigenia in Aulis highlights the importance of gender roles in both the decision Iphigenia makes and in how she is treated by her father, Agamemnon.

Sacrifice and Duty: In Iphigenia in Aulis, Iphigenia is willing to make a great sacrifice to further the Trojan War, a war that she herself has no involvement in. Warfare was a major part of Ancient Greek life, and a source of great renown. Many major Greek artworks depicted the Greek warrior or the art of warfare (art including buildings, statues, coins, and vases). In war, a major theme is sacrifice - it was a great honor to fall in battle as a hero. Iphigenia recognizes this when she chooses to make the sacrifice so that the Greek warriors could sail onwards to Troy. She bears a great sense of duty to her country, and she chooses to lay her life down not for her sake, but for the sake of the war and her country. She only asks that her name is written in history for her great sacrifice, although she does not get this. In some translations, the Gods see her sense of duty and her willingness to die an honorable death, and she is saved by Artemis, who puts a deer in her place at the sacrificial table. In these versions, as a reward for her selflessness, Iphigenia is taken to Tauris by Artemis, where she is made a priestess at Artemis' temple.

== Translations ==
- Jane Lumley (1537–1578), c. 1555 (first published in 1909)
- Robert Potter, 1781 – verse, full text
- T. A. Buckley, 1850 – prose
- Edward Philip Coleridge, 1891 – prose
- Arthur Way, 1912 – verse
- Florence M. Stawell, 1929 – verse
- Moses Hadas and John McLean, 1936 - prose
- Charles R. Walker, 1958
- Philip Vellacott, 1972 – verse
- W. S. Merwin and George E. Dimock Jr., 1978 – verse
- Paul Roche, 1998 – verse (Euripides: Ten Plays (Signet))
- Mary-Kay Gamel, 1999 – prose
- James Morwood, 2002 – verse
- Don Taylor, 2004
- John Davie, 2005 – prose
- George Theodoridis, 2007
- Edward Einhorn, 2013
- Anne Lill, 2013 – Estonian, received Alexander Kurtna Award
- Nicolas Billon & Roger Beck, 2010
- Christopher Collard & James Morwood, 2017 – verse
- Andy Hinds, with Martine Cuypers 2017
- Brian Vinero, 2018 – rhymed verse
- Rachel Hadas, 2018 – verse
