= Pascali's Island (novel) =

1980 novel by Barry Unsworth

- First edition (UK)
- Author: Barry Unsworth
- Language: English
- Genre: Historical novel
- Publisher: Michael Joseph
- Publication date: 1980
- Publication place: United Kingdom
- Media type: Print (Hardback & Paperback)
- Pages: 189 pp
- ISBN: 0-7181-1854-5
- OCLC: 8365961
- LC Class: PR6071.N8 P37x 1980c

Pascali's Island is a novel by Barry Unsworth, first published in 1979. The first United States publication of the book by Simon & Schuster in 1980 was titled The Idol Hunter.

The film version, produced in 1988, was written and directed by James Dearden. It stars Ben Kingsley, Charles Dance and Helen Mirren.

The novel was shortlisted for the Booker Prize in 1980.

== Plot ==
The novel is set on an island which is an outpost of the Ottoman Empire in 1908. Basil Pascali is a spy who reports regularly to Istanbul on the activities of the local people. He expects to be found out at any moment. When an English archaeologist arrives on the island, Pascali is suspicious of him, and the archaeologist's involvement with the woman Pascali loves creates further tensions.
