= Morality Play (novel) =

1995 novel by Barry Unsworth

- First edition
- Author: Barry Unsworth
- Language: English
- Genre: Historical novel
- Publisher: Hamish Hamilton
- Publication date: 1995
- Publication place: United Kingdom
- Media type: Print (hardback and paperback)
- Pages: 188
- ISBN: 0-241-13341-6

Morality Play is a semi-historical detective novel by Barry Unsworth. The book, published in 1995 by Hamish Hamilton was shortlisted for the Man Booker Prize.

== Synopsis ==
The book is set in medieval England sometime near the end of the 14th century, and the events described in the book take place in an unnamed village in Northern England (north of the Humber). A priest fleeing from his diocese joins a group of travelling players. The players are travelling toward their liege lord's castle, where they are expected to play at Christmas, but, short of money, they decide to stage their plays at a village en route. When a morality play from their usual repertoire fails to earn them enough money, Martin, the leader of the group convinces them to stage 'the play of Thomas Wells', a play based on the story of the murder of a young boy from the village. The murderer has already been found, a young woman from the village, and the play seems simple enough; however, they soon find that the facts do not fit. The line between the play and reality blurs and, line by line, they arrive at the truth about the murder.

== Characters ==
- Nicholas Barber: The main character, a young priest who, unable to escape the lure of spring, has fled from his duties.
- Martin Ball: The leader of the players.
- Tobias: A player. A thrifty and wise man, who has been part of the player's group for a long while. He owns a scruffy dog.
- Stephen: A player. Formerly an archer for the Sandville family, but, when he lost his right thumb, could not practice his profession any more and thus became a player instead.
- Springer: A player. The youngest of the group, around fifteen. Because of his boyish face, he plays female roles.
- Straw: A player. The most lively in the group, with strange mood swings.
- Margaret: Stephen's woman. She helped out with the costumes and collected entrance fees.
- Brendan: A dead player. Mostly present in the form of a decomposing body and a harbinger of ill tidings for the group.
- Thomas Wells: The young murdered boy.
- Jack Flint: The villager who discovers the body of Thomas Wells.
- Jane: The young woman accused of the murder.
- John Lambert: Jane's father. A simple weaver with strong moral ideas who is convinced that Jane's arrest was meant to silence him.
- Lord de Guise: The local lord.
- William de Guise: Lord de Guise's son.
- Simon Damian: A corrupt monk bound to the Order of the Benedictines who works for the Lord.
- The King's Justice: A man in the service of the King with the legal authority of a court. He had travelled to the unnamed village to judge Lord de Guise and his practices.
- Sir Roger of Yarm: A knight competing in a jousting tournament.

== Critical reaction ==
The novel is unique in its portrayal of medieval English drama and mystery plays, as it implies that instead of merely rehearsing and performing standard Biblically-based morality plays of the period, that an acting troupe might actually create and structure a play around events in their village, community or surrounding culture. The existence of such culturally-connected playcraft is important to scholars of the period, as it implies that works, such as the N-Town Plays, may have a provenance beyond simple Biblical literalness, and may speak to the concerns of the culture at that period, much as later drama of the Elizabethan period spoke directly to cultural concerns.

== Adaptation ==
The novel was adapted for the screen in 2004, as The Reckoning, directed by Paul McGuigan and starring Paul Bettany and Willem Dafoe.
