= The Reckoning (2004 film) =

- Theatrical release poster
- Directed by: Paul McGuigan
- Screenplay by: Mark Mills
- Based on: Morality Play by Barry Unsworth
- Produced by: Caroline Wood
- Starring: Paul Bettany; Willem Dafoe; Tom Hardy; Gina McKee; Brian Cox; Simon McBurney; Marián Aguilera; Ewen Bremner; Matthew Macfadyen; Mark Benton; Vincent Cassel
- Cinematography: Peter Sova
- Edited by: Andrew Hulme
- Music by: Adrian Lee; Mark Mancina
- Production companies: Kanzaman; M.D.A. Films S.L.; Renaissance Films
- Distributed by: Columbia TriStar Film Distributors International (Spain); Entertainment Film Distributors (United Kingdom)
- Release date: 2004
- Running time: 112 minutes
- Countries: United Kingdom; Spain
- Language: English
- Box office: $257,252 (US)

The Reckoning, also known as Morality Play (and as El misterio de Wells in Spain), is a 2004 murder mystery drama film directed by Paul McGuigan and starring Paul Bettany, Willem Dafoe, Tom Hardy, Gina McKee, Brian Cox and Vincent Cassel. It was written by Mark Mills and based on the 1995 novel Morality Play by Barry Unsworth. Filming was done on location in Spain, Wales, and England.

The story, which is set during the medieval period in England, alludes to the evolution of the theatre arts from what was strictly Biblical morality plays in the period to dramas based on real or extra-Biblical fictional subjects.

== Plot ==
In 1380, in England, the priest Nicholas (Bettany) flees his village when found in flagrante delicto with a married woman. During the flight, he witnesses a group euthanise a member to give him relief from his long-recurring internal pain. He becomes known to the group and is captured. The group is a traveling acting troupe who thinks he is a robber, and they explain the killing. Reluctantly, they allow him to join their troupe to replace the deceased member. On their journey to the next town, they are forced to travel to a new district after a collapsed bridge stops them from taking their normal route and to mend the cart that carries their goods, although they have no money. The troupe reaches a strange town, with its castle under reconstruction, and finds a woman being sentenced to death for killing a boy, upon the testimony of Benedictine Monk Simon Damian (Ewen Bremner). The troupe performs a Biblical passion play, but, as told by the group's leader Martin (Willem Dafoe), so few attend they are unable to bury the dead troupe member and fix their cart.

Martin makes the decision to perform a new play based on the events surrounding the child's murder. He and Nicholas visit the mute, condemned woman in the dungeons, coming away with the strong belief she is innocent. The woman is portrayed as a seductress which infuriates the crowd and the parents of the dead boy, since he was virtuous and too physically strong to be overtaken by the woman. Plantagenet Lord de Guise (Vincent Cassel) watches from the castle and sends the sheriff to clear the square by force. Members of the crowd, on leaving the square, tell the troupe about more details of the death or disappearance of boys.

The troupe is told to leave town by first light, but Nicholas's convictions urge him to determine first-hand what happened to the boy. So in the night, the body is uncovered, and it is found to have been subjected to sodomy before death and also had been exposed to the plague. The King's Justice and his squire comes upon Nicholas and they share some of their suspicions. Nicholas is then forced to leave town, but before long returns in disguise as a monk. The troupe remains on their journey to Durham but Martin relinquishes his role as troupe leader and returns.

Nicholas is aware of the transitions in death from limber to rigor and returns. He visits the monk who testified at trial to say all that he is aware of. The monk reveals he had nothing to do with the death, intimating he is protecting someone else. Nicholas leaves and is found by Martin. The two of them then learn from the King's Justice that the monk has been found dead, and with it, any chance of evidence concerning de Guise's proclivities, and also that de Guise is planning a revolt to seize the English throne.

The sheriff reveals that it seems that wherever de Guise goes, boys disappear. Nicholas then obtains more evidence to prove that the woman is not the real killer (the body was found with rigor mortis, which meant the killing was more recent). The execution is set but before it can be carried out, the troupe has returned and seized the scaffold as a stage for their new play based on the most recent information. The crowd is incensed toward de Guise and the guards are called out again to clear the town square, forcing the actors to the church and unknown to them, de Guise is there performing an act of penitence.

Nicholas presents the evidence to de Guise, who admits everything with an air of invulnerability, knowing that he is untouchable under the feudal system. When de Guise asks Nicholas about his sins, Nicholas confesses that he murdered the husband of the woman he was caught with, after he attacked Nicholas. When leaving, de Guise learns from Nicholas that he has been exposed to the plague. De Guise then stabs Nicholas, who stumbles outside the church. De Guise walks back to his castle through the throng of townsfolk, unaware of the revelations of the new play. He reaches the gate to find that the portcullis is down and he is surrounded by the crowd, who lynch him and set fire to the castle.

The new authorities in the town hope the reason for the deaths will be forgotten. The King's Justice promises that Nicholas' work will be told to the king, but Sarah replies that Nicholas didn't act for the king's sake, but for the wrongly accused, and his own redemption. Martin announces that Nicholas will live on in their new play, which will be presented when they reach Durham. The troupe then departs while the castle is burned to the ground.

== Cast ==
- Paul Bettany as Nicholas
- Willem Dafoe as Martin
- Vincent Cassel as Lord De Guise; a character evoking strong similarities to Gilles de Rais, an actual 15th-century serial child killer (who Cassel also portrayed in the 1999 film The Messenger)
- Brian Cox as Tobias
- Gina McKee as Sarah
- Simon McBurney as Stephen
- Tom Hardy as Straw
- Stuart Wells as Springer (as George Wells)
- Elvira Mínguez as Martha
- Ewen Bremner as Simon Damian
- Mark Benton as Sheriff
- Hamish McColl as Innkeeper
- Matthew Macfadyen as King's Justice
- Marián Aguilera as Nicholas' lover
- Trevor Steedman as The cuckold husband
- James Cosmo as Lambert
- Richard Durden as Town Justice
- Simon Pegg as Gaoler
- Niall Buggy as Priest
- Julian Barratt as Gravedigger

== Production ==
The film was shot in the fall of 2000 on location, in a variety of locations including Almería and Rodalquilar in Andalucía, Spain. Castle interiors were completed at Hedingham Castle, in Essex, England, with additional filming for the traveling sequences shot in mid Wales.

== Reception ==
Rotten Tomatoes, a review aggregator, reports that 40% of 87 surveyed critics gave the film a positive review; the average rating is 5.6/10. Metacritic rated it 49/100 based on 28 reviews, indicating "mixed or average reviews". Lael Loewenstein of Variety wrote, "The Reckoning has its flaws, among them a certain self-righteousness and a complicated storyline, but it is never less than gripping thanks to its gifted international cast." Roger Ebert rated it 3/4 stars and wrote that though there is too much emphasis on the mystery, the film works because of the characters. A. O. Scott of The New York Times called it "a talky, sententious affair".
