= The Ruby in Her Navel =

2006 historical novel by Barry Unsworth

- First edition
- Author: Barry Unsworth
- Language: English
- Genre: Historical novel
- Publisher: Hamish Hamilton
- Publication date: 2006
- Publication place: United Kingdom
- Media type: Print (Hardback & Paperback)
- Pages: 336 pp
- ISBN: 0-241-14220-2
- OCLC: 68260976

The Ruby in Her Navel is a historical novel by Barry Unsworth first published in 2006. It was long listed for the Booker Prize that year.

The story is set in 12th century Sicily and is centered on the Christianization of the Norman kingdom of Sicily under King Roger II. The book is narrated by Thurstan Beauchamp, a young man of English-Norman origins and describes Sicilian life through his eyes. All the good elements of a novel are contained in it: mystery, love, passion, betrayal, and revenge, but the novel's description of life in 12th century Sicily and its resonance to our own times that makes the novel especially interesting. Writing in the Guardian, John Julius Norwich said that the novel made him feel what it felt like to live, work and travel in the Sicily of that time. Jason Goodwin in The New York Times Book Review points to the contemporary resonance of the story, set as it is in the brief time that Normans, Byzantines, Greeks, Muslims, and Jews lived together in relative harmony. The harmony did not work, says Goodwin and "we glimpse the fragile nature of the Sicilian compact — and the gloomy inevitability of the civil conflict that lies ahead".
