= The Greeks Have a Word For It =

1967 novel by Barry Unsworth

- First edition
- Author: Barry Unsworth
- Language: English
- Publisher: Hutchinson
- Publication date: 1967
- Publication place: United Kingdom
- Media type: Print (Hardback & Paperback)
- Pages: 224 pp

The Greeks Have a Word For It is the second novel by Booker Prize-winning author Barry Unsworth published by Hutchinson in 1967. It has since been republished by Weidenfeld & Nicolson in 1993 and W. W. Norton & Company in 2002. It has been praised for its 'utterly convincing characterizations'.

== Background ==
It is set in Athens in the aftermath of the Greek Civil War and draws on the author's own experiences teaching English as a foreign language, satirizing many members of the British Council in Athens.

== Plot introduction ==
Two men arrive in Athens on the same boat. Kennedy an Englishman intends to make a living teaching English and devises a scam to make money fast. Mitsos is returning to Greece after many years away but finds it impossible to escape the memories of the brutal deaths of his parents at the hands of fellow Greeks during the war and an opportunity arises to take revenge. The two men meet briefly as they disembark the boat but their stories then diverge only to come together at the end of the book with fatal results.
