= The Quality of Mercy (Unsworth novel) =

2022 novel by Barry Unsworth

- First edition (UK)
- Author: Barry Unsworth
- Language: English
- Publisher: Hutchinson (UK); Doubleday (US)
- Publication date: 2011
- Publication place: United Kingdom
- Media type: Print
- Pages: 296
- ISBN: 0091937124
- Preceded by: Sacred Hunger

The Quality of Mercy was Barry Unsworth's final novel published in 2011, a sequel to the Booker Prize novel Sacred Hunger. It is set in mostly in County Durham where Unsworth grew up.

== Sacred Hunger (prequel) ==
Sacred Hunger comprises two sections, the first is set in a slave ship. Illness follows the slaves and the captain tells his crew to throw the slaves overboard to claim the insurance. The crew mutiny and the captain is killed.

The second section is set in Florida, a decade later where the ship is beached, and the slaves and crew live alongside each other. Erasmus Kemp's father owned the ship but the bankruptcy led to his death. Kemp captured the crew and returns to London in an attempt to hang them.

== Plot introduction ==
The sequel The Quality of Mercy is set in 1767, Kemp has brought the remainder of the crew who are in Newgate Prison and await the trial. But an Irish fiddler has managed to escape and heads to Durham to tell Billy Blair's mining family of his death in Florida. The insurance case is rejected but the piracy and mutiny trial finds the crew as guilty and they are hanged. Meanwhile, Kemp plans to invest in a mine and heads to Durham to the same village that Sullivan is travelling to. But Kemp falls in love with Jane Ashton as his compassion and sympathy grows.

== Reception ==
Sarah Crown in The Guardian writes "The insurance claim at the heart of the book centres on the question of the value of a slave's life, in pounds, shillings and pence. Writs fly back and forth pertaining to the worth of property. At the other end of the scale, the miners keep soul and body together by sending their sons underground at the age of seven for the life-saving sum of sixpence a day." And concludes the novel "which ought on the surface offer hope and a chance of betterment and freedom for some of its more deserving characters, is so deftly as to leave us in no doubt that, in capitalism's perfectly calibrated machine, the elevation of any one individual will result only in oppression and exploitation of others. It's a fitting final chapter in a superbly bleak novel."
