= The Songs of the Kings =

2002 novel by Barry Unsworth

- First edition
- Author: Barry Unsworth
- Language: English
- Publisher: Hamish Hamilton
- Publication date: 2002
- Publication place: United Kingdom
- Media type: Print (Hardback & Paperback)
- Pages: 245 pp
- ISBN: 0-241-13701-2
- OCLC: 50433306

The Songs of Kings was a novel published in 2002 by Barry Unsworth that retells the story of Iphigenia in Aulis told by the Greek tragic poet Euripides.

== Synopsis ==
The novel is set just before the start of the battle of Troy. The Greek army under King Agamemnon is stuck on the island of Aulis en route to Troy because of a mysterious dying down of the winds. The army is restless and rumor and gossip fly around seeking a reason for the becalming as the men gamble and squabble while they wait and Odysseus connives and schemes behind the scenes with the help of Chasimenos, Agamemnon's chief scribe. The king is slowly convinced that he must sacrifice his daughter Iphigenia for the gods to be satisfied and Iphigenia is brought to Aulis under the pretext that she is to marry Achilles, the Greek hero. Along with her slave, Sisipyla, Iphigenia arrives in Aulis and discovers the plot. Sisipyla offers to take her place but, at the last moment, convinced of her own destiny, Iphigenia sacrifices herself.

== Analysis ==
The novel is seen as a modern take on the Greek legend. Writing in The New York Review of Books, Hilary Mantel says about the book "On one level it is quite clearly, directly related to the present world situation: to wars and rumors of wars, religious intolerance, the power of the storyteller to distort, lose, bury the message." In The Guardian, Alfred Hickling says that Unsworth has recognized the essential modernity of the various retellings of this story and, comparing the impatience of Agamemnon to wage war to the American war in Iraq, says that the novel "effortlessly proves that modern life is the stuff of ancient myth. We may no longer make human sacrifices, but we create plenty of media scapegoats. Unsworth's Iphigenia does not die to absolve her nation. She dies to save their spin."
