= Sacred Hunger =

1992 novel by Barry Unsworth

- First edition cover
- Author: Barry Unsworth
- Cover artist: from Brookes slave ship plan
- Language: English
- Genre: Historical novel
- Publisher: Hamish Hamilton
- Publication date: 27 February 1992
- Publication place: United Kingdom
- Media type: Print (hardback & paperback)
- Pages: 640 pp
- ISBN: 0-241-13003-4
- OCLC: 28423161
- Dewey Decimal: 823/.914 20
- LC Class: PR6071.N8 S3 1992b
- Followed by: The Quality of Mercy

Sacred Hunger is a 1992 historical novel by British author Barry Unsworth. It shared the Booker Prize that year with Michael Ondaatje's The English Patient.

The story is set in the mid 18th century and centres on the Liverpool Merchant, a slave ship employed in the triangular trade, a central trade route in the Atlantic slave trade. The two main characters are cousins Erasmus Kemp, son of a wealthy merchant from Lancashire and Matthew Paris, a physician and scientist who goes on the voyage. The novel's central theme is greed, with the subject of slavery being a primary medium for exploring the issue. The story line has a very extensive cast of characters, some featuring in only one scene, others continually developed throughout the story, but most described in intricate detail. The narrative interweaves elements of appalling cruelty and horror with extended comedic interludes, and employs frequent period expressions.

A sequel, The Quality of Mercy, was published in 2011; it was Unsworth's last book.

== Plot synopsis ==
The novel begins in England during the Age of Enlightenment but long before the days of Darwin and the Slavery Abolition Act 1833. The novel is broken into two books, beginning in 1752 and 1753 and ending in 1765, with a decade or so separating the two. Matthew Paris is a central character in the novel, a physician several years older than his cousin Erasmus. Prior to the beginning of the story Paris had been imprisoned for writings on the age of the Earth that clashed with a literal interpretation of the Bible, his wife Ruth dying while he was incarcerated. Wishing to escape his past, he accepts a position as surgeon on the Liverpool Merchant, a slave ship built and owned by his uncle William Kemp. The elder Kemp's son, Erasmus Kemp, a young man in his early twenties, has a long-standing hatred for his cousin dating back to his younger years. He participates in a play initially, and is enamored with seventeen-year-old Sarah Wolpert, the daughter of a friend of his father. The ship's crew is made up of men available at the time around the Liverpool docks, and many are recruited by blackmail and deception. As the ship sets off toward the African continent to collect its cargo, it becomes clear that Paris and the ship's captain, Saul Thurso, have very different world views.

=== Book One ===
The book's chapters switch between episodic relations of events on the Liverpool Merchant, the senior Kemp's slave ship, and domestic developments in Liverpool. On the ship, Paris finds himself travelling down the coast of West Africa among a crew of men who despise being on the ship but have few other options. Some form friendships with him, while others are more inhospitable. While the crew are treated harshly under the ruthless discipline of Captain Thurso, Paris enjoys a different level of treatment; as the nephew of the ship's owner, he is mocked and belittled but treated as an elite member of the crew. Tensions between these two men arise early and build throughout the voyage. As they reach the coast of Guinea, Paris learns that the slaves are recruited by the local Kru people, who 'hunt' for slaves further inland. Slaves are bartered for trade goods of little value such as slave beads and kettles, with the captain haggling with the local traders. Questions are raised regarding the deliberate exchange of faulty weapons with native slave traders.

Back in England Erasmus is falling in love with a local girl named Sarah Wolpert. He participates in The Enchanted Island on her suggestion, a rewritten play with characters and dialogue drawn from Shakespeare's The Tempest. The two start a relationship, but Erasmus is very possessive, and conflicts ensue. Meanwhile, Kemp's father, a cotton broker, is in financial trouble, relying heavily on strong profits from the voyage of the Merchant.

As slaves come aboard, Paris becomes increasingly concerned with their living conditions and general treatment. He is joined on the ship by Delblanc, an artist and philosopher who shares a similar stature with him on the ship, and with whom he exchanges views on subjects such as authority. The voyage is unlike anything he expected, the slaves taking on a defiant stance. They attempt to take their own lives, with the crew trying to prevent them from doing so. With disease and death already frequent on board the ship, dysentery then strikes. The writings in Paris' journal and his exchanges with those on board show his growing disgust with the slave trade, and he comes to question his motives for coming on the voyage and his role in assisting the slave traders.

I have assisted in the suffering inflicted on these innocent people and in doing so joined the ranks of those that degrade the unoffending... We have taken everything from them and only for the sake of profit—that sacred hunger... which justifies everything, sanctifies all purposes.

Meanwhile, William Kemp commits suicide owing to fear of his imminent bankruptcy. Erasmus, now planning to marry Sarah, is offered a job by her father, a wealthy business man. Too proud to accept his pity, he turns away from the Wolpert family, aiming to rebuild his father's empire.

The situation on board the Merchant continues to deteriorate. Thurso cuts the ship's rations, trying to keep as many slaves alive as possible. Death continues, the corpses tossed overboard. Thurso throws a monkey overboard, a pet brought on board by one of the seamen. The crew begin to rebel against him, and he becomes paranoid, keeping to his own quarters. Finally, Thurso decides to throw the remaining slaves overboard, the insurance money being more attractive than their prospects for sale in a sickened state. As he attempts to have them tossed into the ocean, chains and all, the shipmates revolt. As the first part of the book ends, the fate of the Liverpool Merchant remains unclear.

=== Book Two ===
Roughly a decade on, the second part of the book initially focuses on the fate of Erasmus. Having recovered from bankruptcy and the shame of his father's death, he has married into a wealthy family. His wife Margaret is the daughter of a wealthy man, Sir Hugo, President of the West India Association. Their marriage is clearly one of mere convenience. It seems sure that the Liverpool Merchant has been lost at sea in bad weather. However, Kemp soon learns from another captain that the ship is beached on the southeastern coast of Florida in the Americas. The ship's crew and slaves are said to be living together in a small inland settlement, trading with the local Indians. Seeking retribution against his cousin, Kemp takes a ship to Florida. In St. Augustine he manages to obtain a small force of infantry equipped with cannon to capture the crew.

The ship's crew and slaves have been living together in a community for over a decade, speaking a trade pidgin from the Guinea coast. The few women are shared among the men, many of which now have children. Paris has a son with a woman named Tabakali, who he shares with another man. The small community live in a primitive fashion, having a simple anarchist–socialist political system. Life is peaceful in general though, even utopian. The translator tells the children stories in a pidgin tongue which they all share, while Paris reads to them from Alexander Pope and David Hume.

Erasmus finds Paris' journal among the wreckage of the Merchant, his cousin's writings clashing with his strongly capitalist convictions, and further whetting his appetite for retribution. Erasmus' hatred for his cousin stems from his childhood, when Matthew had forcefully lifted him away when he was trying to dam a river. With his party of fifty, he finds the settlement. Some are shot, the rest being taken to St. Augustine by ship. He intends to sell the slaves as his father's property, and have the crew hanged for murdering Thurso. He particularly looks forward to the hanging of his cousin Paris, whose leg wound appears minor. But the trauma of the gunshot has triggered "some occlusion of the blood," a pulmonary embolism that Paris recognises as fatal. Paris dies before the ship can reach St. Augustine, and Erasmus comes to the realisation that Paris did not lift him clear of the dam to cheat him of victory, but to save him from defeat.
