= Stuart Wells =

British actor

- Born: 18 September 1982 (age 43); Wallsend, England, United Kingdom
- Occupations: Actor, soldier
- Years active: 1999–2003

Stuart Wells (born 18 September 1982) is an English former actor. He is best known for his role as Michael in the film Billy Elliot (2000). Wells turned 17 during the filming, but he portrayed an 11-year-old.

In 2001, Wells quit acting to join the British Army's 1st Battalion, Royal Regiment of Fusiliers. He left the Army in 2008 with the rank of corporal after serving three operational tours, including two in Iraq, and was living in Newcastle as of 2022.

Wells' brother, John, is also a former member of the British Army.

== Filmography ==
Film and television
Year	Title	Role	Notes
2000	Billy Elliot	Michael Caffrey	
2004	The Reckoning	Springer (as George Wells)	
