= Land of Marvels =

2009 novel by Barry Unsworth

- First edition
- Author: Barry Unsworth
- Language: English
- Genre: Historical novel
- Publisher: Hutchinson
- Publication date: 2009
- Publication place: United Kingdom
- Media type: Print (Hardback & Paperback)
- Pages: 304 pp
- ISBN: 978-0-09-192617-5
- OCLC: 258072935

Land of Marvels is a historical novel by the author Barry Unsworth. It is set in Mesopotamia on the eve of the first world war.

== Synopsis ==
John Somerville, an archaeologist digging in Mesopotamia, is racing against time hoping he will make an important discovery before the German built Baghdad Railway comes and claims the mound he is digging on. Hardly anyone realizes it, but World War I is looming against the backdrop. Almost by chance, Somerville stumbles on an important discovery from the Neo-Assyrian Empire and the urgency of his work increases. Meanwhile, an American geologist, in the pay of the British, the German bank Deutsche Bank, as well as an American oil company, disguised as an archaeologist, arrives at the dig hoping to find an oil field nearby. An English major who is not quite what he seems, a Swiss journalist who is neither Swiss, nor a journalist, and an Arab fixer who has dreams of acquiring a hundred gold coins for the hand of the love of his life add to the mix at the dig and lead to an ending that has been described as "dramatic and richly symbolic, if rather abrupt."
