= Pascali's Island (film) =

- Theatrical release poster
- Directed by: James Dearden
- Written by: James Dearden
- Based on: Pascali's Island by Barry Unsworth
- Produced by: Tania Blunden; Paul Raphael; Mirella Sklavounou
- Starring: Ben Kingsley; Charles Dance; Helen Mirren
- Cinematography: Roger Deakins
- Edited by: Edward Marnier
- Music by: Loek Dikker
- Production companies: Initial Film and Television; Channel Four Films; Dearfilm; British Screen
- Distributed by: Virgin Vision (through 20th Century Fox)
- Release date: 12 May 1988 (Cannes Film Festival)
- Running time: 104 minutes
- Country: United Kingdom
- Language: English
- Budget: $2.26 million
- Box office: £208,239 (UK)

Pascali's Island is a 1988 British drama film based on the 1980 novel by Barry Unsworth. It was written and directed by James Dearden. It stars Ben Kingsley, Charles Dance, Helen Mirren and Kevork Malikyan. It was entered into the 1988 Cannes Film Festival.

The action takes place in 1908 on the fictional Ottoman-ruled Greek island of Nisi. The film was largely shot on the Greek island of Symi and in Rhodes in the late summer of 1987.

== Plot ==
In 1908 at Nisi, a small Greek Island under Ottoman rule, Turkish officials, Greek rebels, German emissaries, and other foreign mercenaries mingle as they all try to keep the upper hand in that remote part of the crumbling Ottoman Empire. Basil Pascali, a half-British half-Maltese man, considers himself a local feature on the island. Since his arrival twenty years before, he has spied for the Sultan, sending detailed reports about suspicious activities. He has no idea whether anybody reads his observations as he never receives a reply, but his payment still arrives regularly so he continues his work as an informant with unfailing eagerness.

Pascali's suspicions are aroused by the arrival of Anthony Bowles, a British archaeologist, whose purpose in visiting the island is unclear. Basil quickly befriends Bowles at the hotel’s lounge bar and offers his services as an interpreter. Pascali introduces Bowles to his close friend Lydia Neumann, an Austrian painter resident on the island. While Lydia and Anthony chat, Pascali slips into Bowles' hotel room to investigate.

In Bowles' suitcase, Pascali finds a carved marble head but nothing that reveals Bowles' purpose on the island. Needing help arranging a deal to lease some land from the local Pasha, Bowles hires Pascali as an interpreter. At Bowles' insistence, the agreement is sealed officially with a contract. Suspecting something unusual, Pascali warns Bowles that the Pasha is not a man to be crossed. Meanwhile, the Turkish authorities tell Pascali that he will be held responsible if Bowles fails to make the full payment.

Spying on Bowles, Pascali finds the archaeologist beginning an affair with Lydia, swimming naked with her in a remote cove. Pascali is evidently secretly in love with Lydia and envies the handsome British archaeologist. Aroused by the experience, Pascali relieves his sexual frustration at a Turkish bath. Unexpectedly, Bowles wants to change the terms of his contract: he says he has found some small archaeological objects of great significance and wants the right to excavate to be included in a new lease. Once again Pascali serves as interpreter and intermediary with the Pasha, who seeing the objects, a gold necklace, and the antique statue's head, refuses to grant the excavation rights. The Pasha wants to buy the lease back; Bowles asks for a much larger sum than he originally paid. Pascali tells Bowles that he does not need to keep up the pretense with him: he knows that the statue's head was brought by Bowles to swindle the Turkish authorities, enticing them to buy the lease at a higher amount. Pascali asks for part of Bowles' earnings in exchange for his silence. Bowles agrees.

The plot becomes more complicated when Bowles makes a genuinely important archaeological discovery: a large bronze statue of a boy from Greek times in pristine condition. Deciding to retrieve the statue secretly, Bowles asks Pascali for help in delaying the closing of the lease deal for two more days. Pascali helps him not only with the Turkish authorities but also with the excavation. He intends to use the money Bowles offers him to travel to Constantinople and find out what has happened to his reports, the only thing that has given meaning to his life. Both Lydia and Bowles try to persuade Pascali to leave the island, as the fall of the Ottoman Empire is imminent. Believing, however, that Bowles is going to swindle him over the money, Pascali denounces him to the Turkish authorities. He guides them that night to the excavation site, but as Bowles and Lydia are planning to leave the island, with the help of the Americans, taking the statue with them, they are all shot and killed by the Turks.

Pascali, already regretting having betrayed his friends, returns home to find his payment and a letter from Bowles trying to help him leave the island. Pascali is devastated over his useless misreading of the situation. He concludes that his reports were neither read nor kept. He loved both Lydia and Bowles but caused their deaths. As the Ottoman Empire crumbles, the only thing left for Pascali is to wait for the Greeks to come for him.

== Cast ==
- Ben Kingsley - Basil Pascali
- Charles Dance - Anthony Bowles
- Helen Mirren - Lydia Neumann
- Kevork Malikyan - Mardosian
- George Murcell - Herr Gesing
- Nadim Sawalha - Pasha
- Stefan Gryff - Izzet Effendi
- Vernon Dobtcheff - Pariente (translator)
- Sheila Allen - Mrs. Marchant
- T. P. McKenna - Dr. Hogan
- Danielle Allan - Mrs. Hogan
- Nick Burnell - Chaudan
- Giorgos Oikonomou - Greek Rebel
- Alistair Campbell - Captain
- Ali Abatsis - Boy in Bath
- Brook Williams - Turkish Officer
- Joshua Losey - Turkish Soldier (as Josh Losey)
- Nick Karagiannis - Boy in Church

== Reception ==
Caryn James, writing for The New York Times called it "Slow and stately, [the film] never gets beneath its own superficial gentility" and criticized the performances, dialogue, and cinematography. Conversely, Roger Ebert praised the cast's performances, writing "Everything in a film like this depends on performance, and it is hard to imagine how it could have been better cast." Michael Wilmington of The Los Angeles Times called it "a film easy to recommend critically, but hard, in some ways, to like." At the same time, he wrote "This is quality filmmaking with a vengeance."
