= William C. Hammond =

American novelist of historical fiction (born 1947)

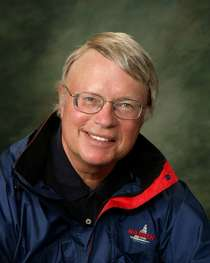
- Born: November 5, 1947 (age 78); Boston, Massachusetts, U.S.
- Education: Groton School; University of North Carolina at Chapel Hill (BA); Babson College (MBA)
- Occupations: Novelist, publishing consultant
- Spouse: Sheree Fenwick
- Children: Churchill Hammond; Brooks Hammond; Harrison Hammond
- Writing career
- Genre: Historical fiction
- Website: www.bill-hammond.com/bio.htm

William C. Hammond (born November 5, 1947, in Boston, Massachusetts) is an American novelist of historical fiction best known for his Cutler Family Chronicles series.

== Biography ==
=== Early life ===
The grandson of William Churchill Hammond, an American organist, choirmaster, and music educator Mount Holyoke College, Hammond grew up in Manchester-by-the-Sea, a seaside town on Boston’s North Shore, where he learned to sail and haul lobster traps in the waters off Cape Ann. A graduate of the Groton School in Groton, Massachusetts, Hammond went on to earn a Bachelor of Arts degree at the University of North Carolina at Chapel Hill and a Masters of Business Administration in Entrepreneurial Studies at Babson College in Wellesley, Massachusetts. He also spent a summer in his late teens at Hurricane Island Outward Bound School off the coast of Maine.

=== Career ===
Hammond's 40-year career in book publishing has included seven years of work as a sales representative and, subsequently, trade sales manager for Little, Brown & Company, the U.S. publisher of C. S. Forester, whose Hornblower series ignited a passion in the author for nautical and historical fiction. He also served for four years as publisher of Hazelden Publishing and Education, where he learned the fundamentals for what was to become 12 Step Wisdom at Work, a business motivational work that was published by Kogan Page (London) in 2000.
Hammond, a sailor, and lifelong student of history and reader of historical fiction, wrote A Matter of Honor, For Love of Country, and subsequent titles in the series originally published by the United States Naval Institute. In 2020, the publishing rights to the series were acquired by Globe Pequot Press which will publish all volumes of the series in paperback format under its McBooks Press imprint. The six novels profile the American perspective In the Age of Fighting Sail and follow the Cutler family of Hingham, Massachusetts and Fareham, England from the start of the American Revolution through the War of 1812. Highlights in the series include conflicts with Barbary pirates in the Mediterranean, the Quasi War with France in the West Indies, the birth of Haiti, the rise of America as a commercial power, and the ongoing love affair between the protagonist and his English-born wife.
He has also published articles in various sailing and business magazines and book reviews in numerous daily newspapers. Hammond has also served as president of his own management consulting firm, as a principal of a boutique investment bank in Concord, Massachusetts, as a principal of Book Architects in, St. Paul, Minnesota, and as a principal of 2 Bills Literary Agency in Minneapolis, Minnesota.
He now lives in Puhoi, New Zealand with his wife, Sheree and her family.

== Bibliography ==
=== The Cutler Family Chronicles ===
1. Matter Of Honor (2008)
2. For Love Of Country (2010)
3. The Power And The Glory (2011)
4. A Call To Arms (2012)
5. How Dark The Night (2014)
6. No Sacrifice Too Great (2021)
