= Losing Nelson =

1999 novel by Barry Unsworth

- First edition (publ. Hamish Hamilton)
- Author: Barry Unsworth
- Publisher: Nan A. Talese
- Publication date: October 19, 1999
- ISBN: 0-385-48652-9

Losing Nelson is a 1999 novel by English author Barry Unsworth.

== Synopsis ==
Its protagonist, Charles Cleasby, who is obsessed with Lord Nelson, attempts to re-enact events of "Horatio"'s life to the point of feeling that he is the admiral, and who is writing a hagiographic biography. His typist, the down-to-earth Miss Lily, serves as his foil in her criticism of Nelson's ego and treatment of his wife. At the end, when Cleasby has journeyed to Naples to do research in the hope of exonerating his hero for his execution of Admiral Caracciolo and other Neapolitan Jacobins, he murders a child near the location of Nelson's betrayal, simultaneously imagining that he is killing the child Nelson and that the act forever merges him with Nelson.
