= Barry Unsworth =

English novelist (1930–2012)

- Born: 10 August 1930; Wingate, County Durham, England
- Died: 4 June 2012 (aged 81); Perugia, Umbria, Italy
- Occupation: Writer
- Writing career
- Period: 1966–2012
- Genre: Novel
- Subject: Historical fiction
- Notable work: Sacred Hunger
- Notable awards: Booker Prize; 1992

Barry Unsworth FRSL (10 August 1930 – 4 June 2012) was an English writer known for his historical fiction. He published 17 novels, and was shortlisted for the Booker Prize three times, winning once for the 1992 novel Sacred Hunger.

== Biography ==
Unsworth was born on 10 August 1930 in Wingate, a mining village in County Durham, England, to a family of miners. His father first entered the mines at age 12 and ordinarily Unsworth would have followed him as a miner. However, when his father was 19, he travelled to the United States for a few years and on returning to Britain entered the insurance business and thus began moving his family up the economic ladder and out of the mines. "He rescued my brother and me from that long chain of continuity that happens in mining villages," Unsworth said.

He graduated from the University of Manchester in 1951, and lived in France for a year teaching English. He also travelled extensively in Greece and Turkey during the 1960s, lecturing at the University of Athens and the University of Istanbul. His novels about fin-de-siecle Ottoman Empire, The Rage of the Vulture and Pascali's Island, were inspired by these experiences. He published his first novel in 1966, his second novel, The Greeks Have a Word For It, was an outgrowth of his teaching experience in Athens.

In 1999 he was a visiting professor at the University of Iowa's Iowa Writers' Workshop. In 2004 he taught literature and creative writing classes at Kenyon College in Ohio.

In the last years of his life, he lived in Perugia, a city in the Umbria region of Italy, with his second wife, a Finnish national. His novel After Hannibal is a fictionalised description of his efforts at settlement in the Italian countryside.

Unsworth died in Perugia, Italy in 2012, of lung cancer. He was 81. Unsworth died the same day as Ray Bradbury; as Cynthia Crossen said in the Wall Street Journal, "Mr. Bradbury invented the future; Mr. Unsworth invented the past."

== Work ==
Unsworth's first novel, The Partnership, was published in 1966 when he was 36. "...in my earlier novels, especially the two written in the early '70s, The Hide and Mooncranker's Gift, there was a baroque quality in the style, a density. The mood was grim, but the language was more figurative and more high-spirited. There was more delight in it, more self-indulgence, too. Among my earliest influences as a writer were the American novelists of the deep south, especially Eudora Welty, and some of that elated, grotesque comedy stayed with me." Mooncranker's Gift (1973) won the Heinemann Award. Other novels included Stone Virgin (1985) and Losing Nelson (1999). In addition to Eudora Welty, he counted William Faulkner and Carson McCullers as his major influences.

Unsworth did not start to write historical fiction until his sixth novel, Pascali's Island (1980), the first of his novels to be shortlisted for the Booker Prize. Pascali's Island is set on an unnamed Aegean island during the last years of the Ottoman Empire. Reflecting on this shift, Unsworth explained: "Nowadays I go to Britain relatively rarely and for short periods; in effect, I have become an expatriate. The result has been a certain loss of interest in British life and society and a very definite loss of confidence in my ability to register the contemporary scene there – the kind of things people say, the styles of dress, the politics etc.– with sufficient subtlety and accuracy. So I have turned to the past. The great advantage of this, for a writer of my temperament at least, is that one is freed from a great deal of surface clutter. One is enabled to take a remote period and use it as a distant mirror (to borrow Barbara Tuchman’s phrase), and so try to say things about our human condition – then and now – which transcend the particular period and become timeless." A film version directed by James Dearden, starring Charles Dance, Helen Mirren and Ben Kingsley, as the title character, was released in 1988.

Morality Play, shortlisted for the Booker Prize in 1995, is a murder mystery set in 14th century England about a travelling troupe of players that put on Bible plays. It was adapted as a film, The Reckoning (2004), starring Paul Bettany and Willem Dafoe.

Sacred Hunger (1992) centres on the Atlantic slave trade that moves from Liverpool to West Africa, Florida and the West Indies. It was joint winner of the Booker Prize for Fiction in 1992, along with Michael Ondaatje's The English Patient. It is generally considered his masterpiece. The story is set in the mid-18th century and centres around the Liverpool Merchant, a slave ship employed in the triangular trade, a central trade route in the Atlantic slave trade. The two main characters are cousins Erasmus Kemp, son of a wealthy merchant from Lancashire, and Matthew Paris, a physician and scientist who goes on the voyage. The novel's central theme is greed, with the subject of slavery being a primary medium for exploring how selfish desire for profit can result in evil and barbarism. The "sacred hunger" of the title refers to the profit motive. The story line has a very extensive cast of characters, some featuring in only one scene, others continually developed throughout the story, but most described in intricate detail. The narrative interweaves elements of appalling cruelty and horror with extended comedic interludes, and employs frequent period expressions. A sequel, The Quality of Mercy, was published in 2011, it was his last book.

Sugar and Rum (1988) was a novel set in contemporary Liverpool about a writer who is trying to write a novel about the Liverpool slave trade, and who is suffering from writer's block; Unsworth wrote this novel to try to get over his own block during the writing of Sacred Hunger.

== Style ==
Unsworth's style is not heaped in historical minutiae, "I don't really care how many buttons someone had on his waistcoat. It would be good to get it right, but what really matters is trying to get hold of the spirit of the age, what it was like to be alive in that age, what it felt like to be…an ordinary person in the margins of history."

On writing and growing old, Unsworth said, "With time I have grown more sparing with the words. I think less of fire-works and flourishes. I try to get warmth and colour through precision of language. This is more difficult, I think, which may be why I find writing novels so challenging and exacting."

Some critics have attacked historical fiction as being un-literary, for example James Wood writing in The New Yorker called it a "somewhat gimcrack genre not exactly jammed with greatness." However Unsworth defended the form, saying "The term historical fiction is a blunt instrument in literary criticism. When people ask, 'Is it a good historical novel?' they may as well ask, 'Is it a good Protestant novel?' or 'Is it a good transvestite novel?' I write stories that are set in the past. Fiction set in the past should be judged by the same criteria as any other fiction. Does the novel convey a sense of life, touch the reader's mind and heart? Does it belong to what D.H. Lawrence called the one bright book of life?"

== Awards and honours ==
- 1973 Heinemann Award, Mooncranker's Gift
- 1980 Booker Prize, shortlist, Pascali's Island
- 1992 Booker Prize, co-winner, Sacred Hunger
- 1995 Booker Prize, shortlist, Morality Play
- 2006 Booker Prize, longlist, The Ruby in Her Navel
- 2012 Walter Scott Prize, shortlist, The Quality of Mercy

== List of works ==
Novels

- The Partnership (1966)
- The Greeks Have a Word For It (1967)
- The Hide (1970)
- Mooncranker's Gift (1973)
- The Big Day (1976)
- Pascali's Island (1980) (US edition first published as The Idol Hunter)
- The Rage of the Vulture (1982)
- Stone Virgin (1985)
- Sugar and Rum (1988)
- Sacred Hunger (1992)
- Morality Play (1995)
- After Hannibal (1996)
- Losing Nelson (1999)
- The Songs of the Kings (2002)
- The Ruby in Her Navel (2006)
- Land of Marvels (2009)
- The Quality of Mercy (2011)

Nonfiction

- Crete (2004)
