= Cynthia Crossen =

American journalist and book critic

Cynthia Crossen is an American author and journalist whose career as an editor spanned The Village Voice, the American Lawyer, and the Wall Street Journal. At the Journal, she created and wrote Dear Book Lover, a literary advice column and website.

== Early life and education ==
Crossen was born in Battle Creek, Michigan, in 1951. She graduated from Macalester College in 1973.

== Career ==
Crossen worked at Essence magazine, New Jersey Monthly, and the American Lawyer and in 1981 became managing editor of the Village Voice. In 1983 she moved to The Wall Street Journal, where reporting beats included marketing and publishing. From 2002 to 2008, she wrote Déjà Vu, a column about history. Then she became Marketplace Editor, and she continued at the Journal as a columnist and Senior Editor until 2012.

In 1994, Crossen wrote Tainted Truth, an exposé of hidden sponsorship in ostensibly neutral surveys and studies and their abuse in journalism and advertising. Her next book, The Rich and How they Got That Way, won the WH Smith award for best business book in 2000.

=== Books ===
- Tainted Truth: The Manipulation of Fact in America (1994)
- The Rich and How They Got That Way: How the Wealthiest People of All Time—from Genghis Khan to Bill Gates—Made Their Fortunes (2000)

== Personal life ==
She is married to James Gleick.
