= HMS Nelson =

Three ships and a naval base of the Royal Navy have been named HMS Nelson in honour of Horatio Nelson:

- HMS Nelson (1814) was a 120-gun first rate launched in 1814. She was converted to screw propulsion and rearmed to 90 guns in 1860, and was handed over to the government of the Colony of Victoria, Australia, in 1867. She was sold in 1898 as a storage hulk, and later used as a coal hulk, and was scrapped in 1928.
- HMS Nelson (1876) was a Nelson-class armoured cruiser, launched in 1876. She became a training ship in 1902. and she was sold as scrap in 1910.
- HMS Nelson (28) was a Nelson-class battleship. She was launched in 1925, served during World War II, and was scrapped in 1949.
- HMS Nelson (shore establishment) is a stone frigate based within the walls of HMNB Portsmouth.

== Battle honours ==
- Malta Convoys 1941−42
- North Africa 1942−43
- Sicily 1943
- Salerno 1943
- Mediterranean 1943
- Normandy 1944

== See also ==
- HMS Lord Nelson
