= HMS Lord Nelson =

Two ships of the Royal Navy have been named HMS Lord Nelson, after the Vice-admiral Horatio Nelson, victor of the Battle of Trafalgar:

- HMS Lord Nelson (1800) was a storeship purchased in 1800 and sold in 1807.
- HMS Lord Nelson (1906) was a Lord Nelson-class battleship launched in 1906. She was sold in 1920 and was resold in 1921.

== Battle Honours ==
- Dardanelles 1915−16

== See also ==
- Ships named HMS Nelson, four Royal Navy warships also named after Lord Nelson
- Hired armed cutter Lord Nelson: three hired cutters named after Lord Nelson
- Lord Nelson (East Indiaman), an East Indiaman launched in 1799 and lost without trace in 1809
- STS Lord Nelson, a sail training ship used by the British Jubilee Sailing Trust
