= Landscape with the Port of Santa Marinella =

Painting by Claude Lorrain

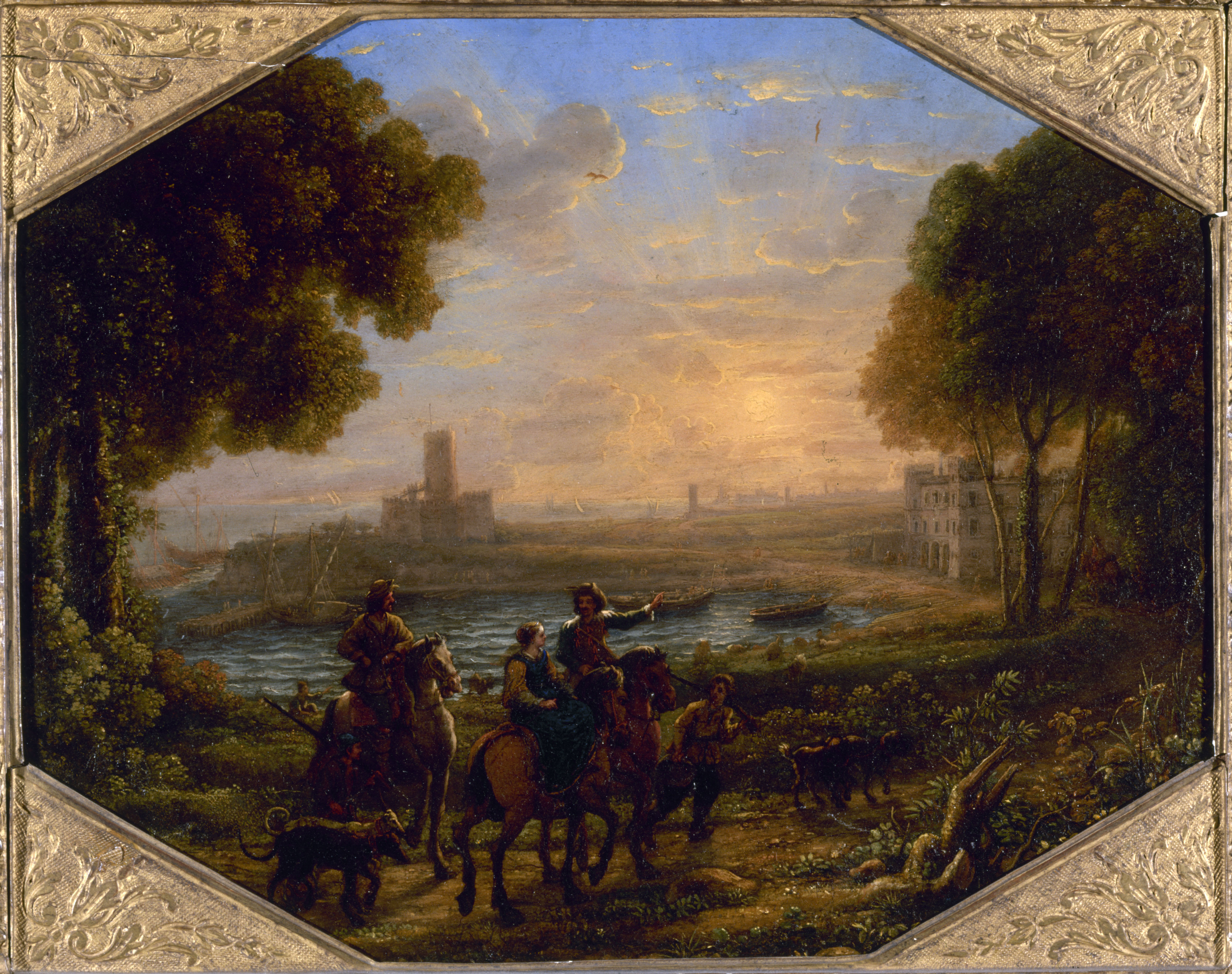
Claude Lorrain - Paysage avec le port de Santa Marinella (Petit Palais)

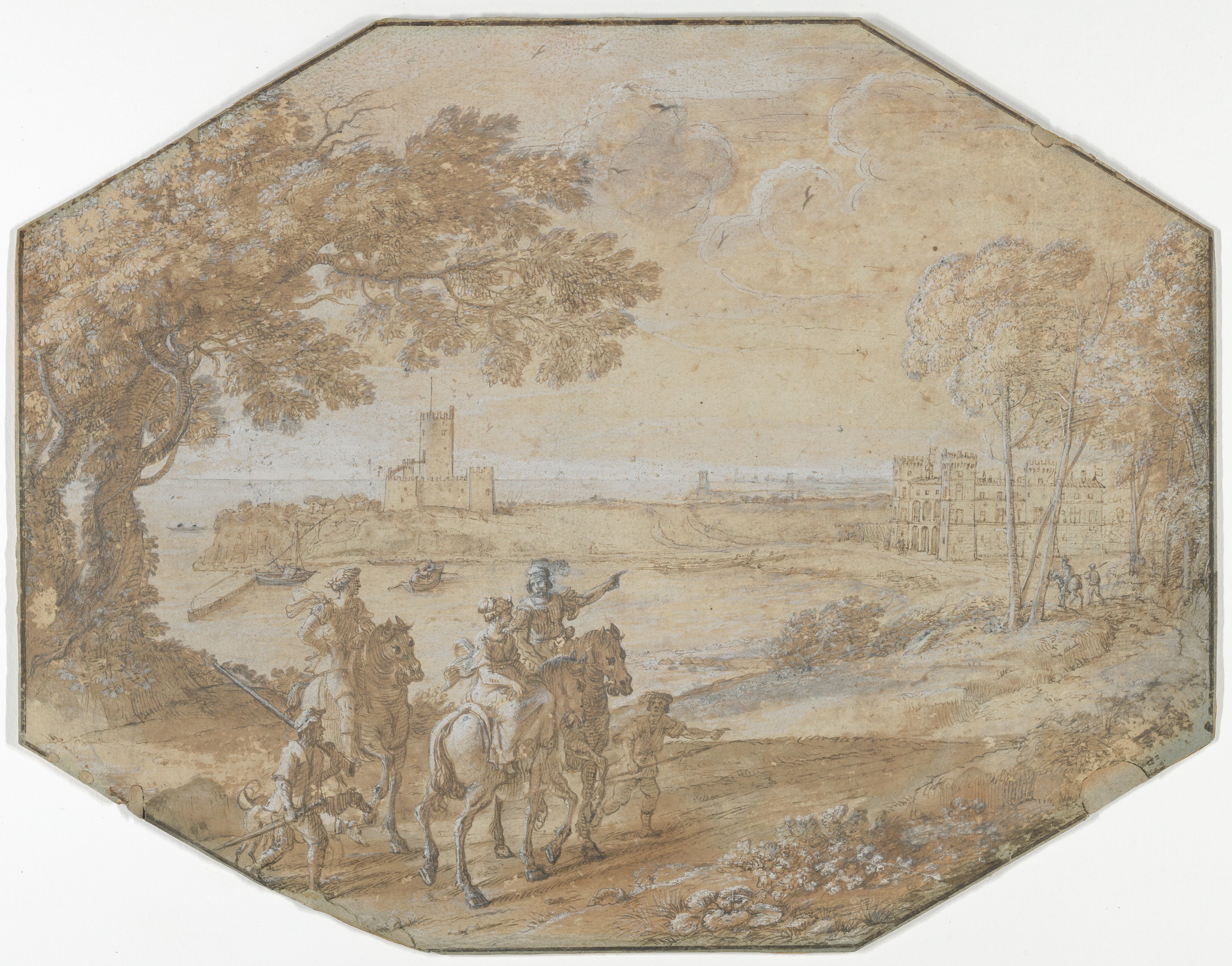
Claude Lorrain - drawing for Paysage avec le port de Santa Marinella (Metropolitan Museum of Art)

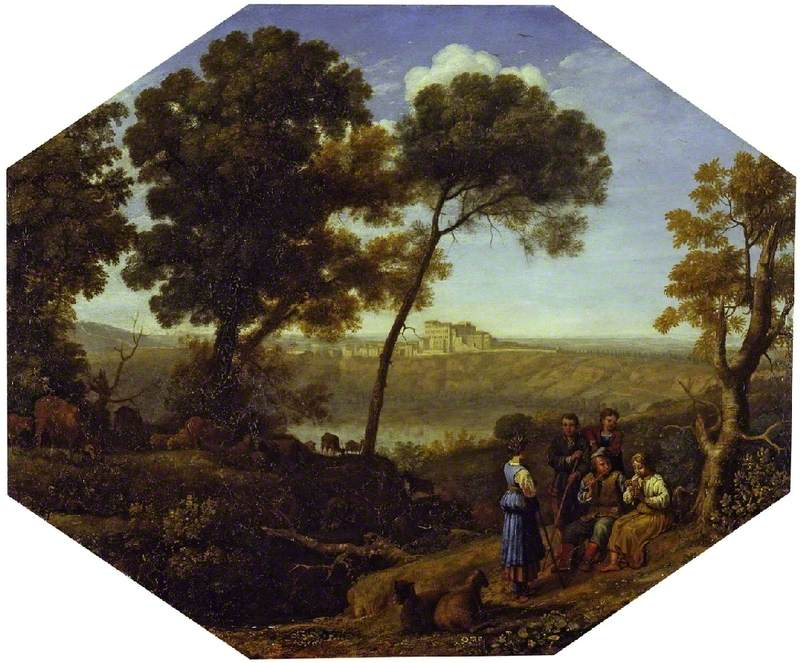
Claude Lorrain - Pastoral Landscape with Lake Albano and Castel Gandolfo

Landscape with the Port of Santa Marinella (French: Paysage avec le port de Santa Marinella) is an oil on copper painting by Claude Lorrain in the collection of the Petit Palais in Paris. It dates from 1637 or 1638, and is one of a pair commissioned from the artist by Pope Urban VIII. It depicts the little harbour of Santa Marinella near Civitavecchia which the Pope wanted to turn into a major port. The other painting in the pair, in the Fitzwilliam Museum, Cambridge, is a view of Castel Gandolfo, a palace on the banks of Lake Albano. It was acquired by the Petit Palais in 1902 as part of the Dutuit bequest.

== Subject ==
Although Lorrain visited Santa Marinella to sketch, the painting is not an accurate view, but rather an idealised representation of the landscape. The painting actually shows less detail than existed in reality near that location, focusing instead on creating a fantasy landscape suffused with light, illuminating the depths of the scene and reflecting off the sea. The painting combines great physical beauty on its surface, with dense and detailed brushstrokes with a richness of the pigments.

As in many of his other paintings, Lorrain uses light as a means of conveying the passage of time. He often painted works evoking different specific times of the day, such as early morning or falling dusk. In general, his pastoral landscapes are bathed in the clear light of morning, while his seascapes are lit with the long rays of the setting sun.

== Related works ==
A drawing of the same subject, the same size as the painting, is held in the collection of the Metropolitan Museum of Art. Lorrain’s sketchbook with preparatory drawings for the work is held by the British Museum. The Hamburger Kunsthalle has a 1779 mezzotint engraving by Richard Earlom which is based on the drawing in the British Museum. the Tate Gallery holds notes taken by Joseph Mallord William Turner on the painting. The subject of an isolated castle in a quasi-fantastic landscape was one that Lorrain returned to in his later work, The Enchanted Castle.
