= The Flight into Egypt (Lorrain) =

Painting by Claude Lorrain

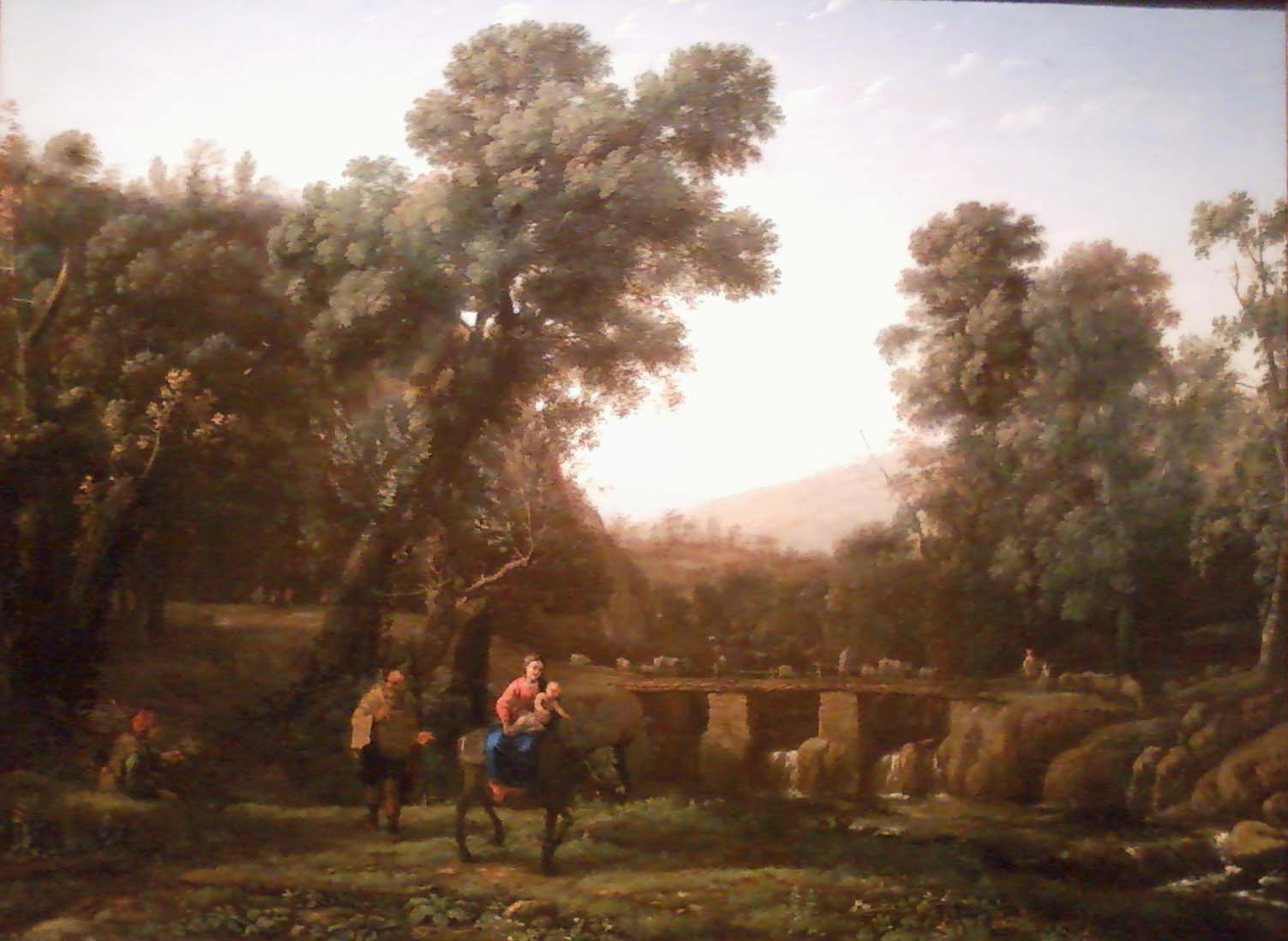
- Artist: Claude Lorrain
- Year: 1635
- Type: Oil painting on canvas
- Dimensions: 71 cm × 98 cm (28 in × 38.5 in)
- Location: Indianapolis Museum of Art; Indianapolis

The Flight into Egypt is a 1635 oil painting by French artist Claude Lorrain, located in the Indianapolis Museum of Art, which is in Indianapolis, Indiana. It depicts the Flight into Egypt, when the Holy Family fled to Egypt to escape Herod's persecution.

== Description ==
This early painting by Claude shows Joseph, Mary, and Jesus fleeing the massacre in Bethlehem. In a prefiguration of his future role, the infant Jesus holds the donkey's reins. Although the trio is escaping a slaughter, Claude depicted them in a serene setting. Landscapes like this made Claude famous by combining a rustic vocabulary of shepherds and towering trees with realistic portrayals of the Roman countryside. He perfected his depictions of the latter by risking malaria in order to make the sketches that would allow him to capture the campagna's golden sunlight and atmospheric effects. The Holy Family may be the subject, but the real focus is on light, not narrative. Claude's idealized, Acadian landscape is a study of light and atmosphere in which the religious theme is secondary.

== Historical information ==
Claude depicted the Flight into Egypt many times, especially in his earlier works. He never painted anything but landscapes, but he created those with such skill that he elevated the genre to new heights. His poetic vision of nature was so highly regarded by his wealthy seventeenth-century patrons that it helped establish landscape painting as a genre in its own right, just like religious and historical paintings.

=== Acquisition ===
As a part of the Clowes Collection, The Flight into Egypt was on display at the IMA for decades before it was officially donated, in 2003. At that point, it became a part of the permanent collection and was given the accession number 2003.171. It currently hangs in the William L. and Jane H. Fortune Gallery.

== See also ==
- Village Fête
- The Flight into Egypt (Poussin painting)
