= Claude Lorrain =

French painter, draughtsman and etcher (d. 1682)

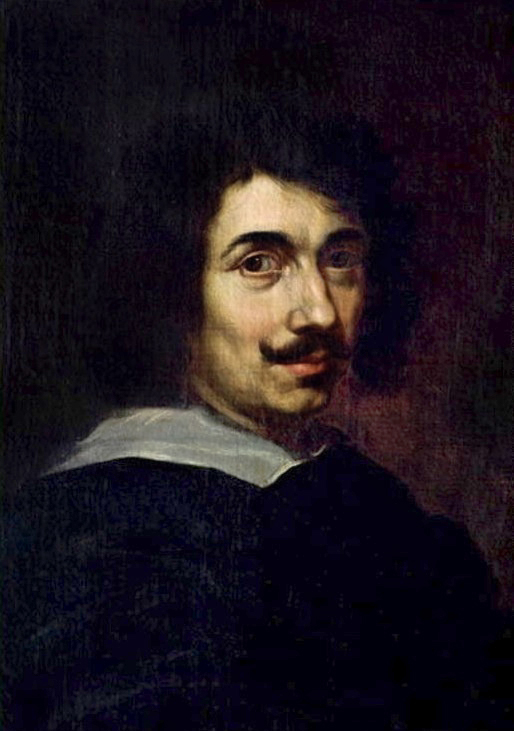
- Claude's self-portrait
- Born: Claude Gellée; 1600 or 1604/5; Chamagne, Duchy of Lorraine
- Died: 21 November or 23 November 1682 (aged 77/78 or 82); Rome, Papal States
- Known for: Painting
- Movement: Baroque

Claude Lorrain (French: [klod lɔ.ʁɛ̃]; born Claude Gellée [ʒəle], called le Lorrain in French; traditionally just Claude in English; c. 1600 – 23 November 1682) was a painter, draughtsman and etcher of the Baroque era originally from the Duchy of Lorraine. He spent most of his life in Italy, and is one of the earliest significant western artists, aside from his contemporaries in Dutch Golden Age painting, to concentrate on landscape painting. His landscapes often transitioned into the more prestigious genre of history paintings by addition of a few small figures, typically representing a scene from the Bible or classical mythology.

By the end of the 1630s, he was established as the leading landscapist in Italy, and he enjoyed large fees for his work. His landscapes gradually became larger, but with fewer figures, more carefully painted, and produced at a lower rate. He was not generally an innovator in landscape painting, except in introducing the sun and streaming sunlight into many paintings, which had been rare before. He is now thought of as a French painter, but was born in the independent Duchy of Lorraine, and almost all his painting was done in Italy; before the late 19th century he was regarded as a painter of the "Roman School". His patrons were also mostly Italian, but after his death he became very popular with English collectors, and the UK retains a high proportion of his works.

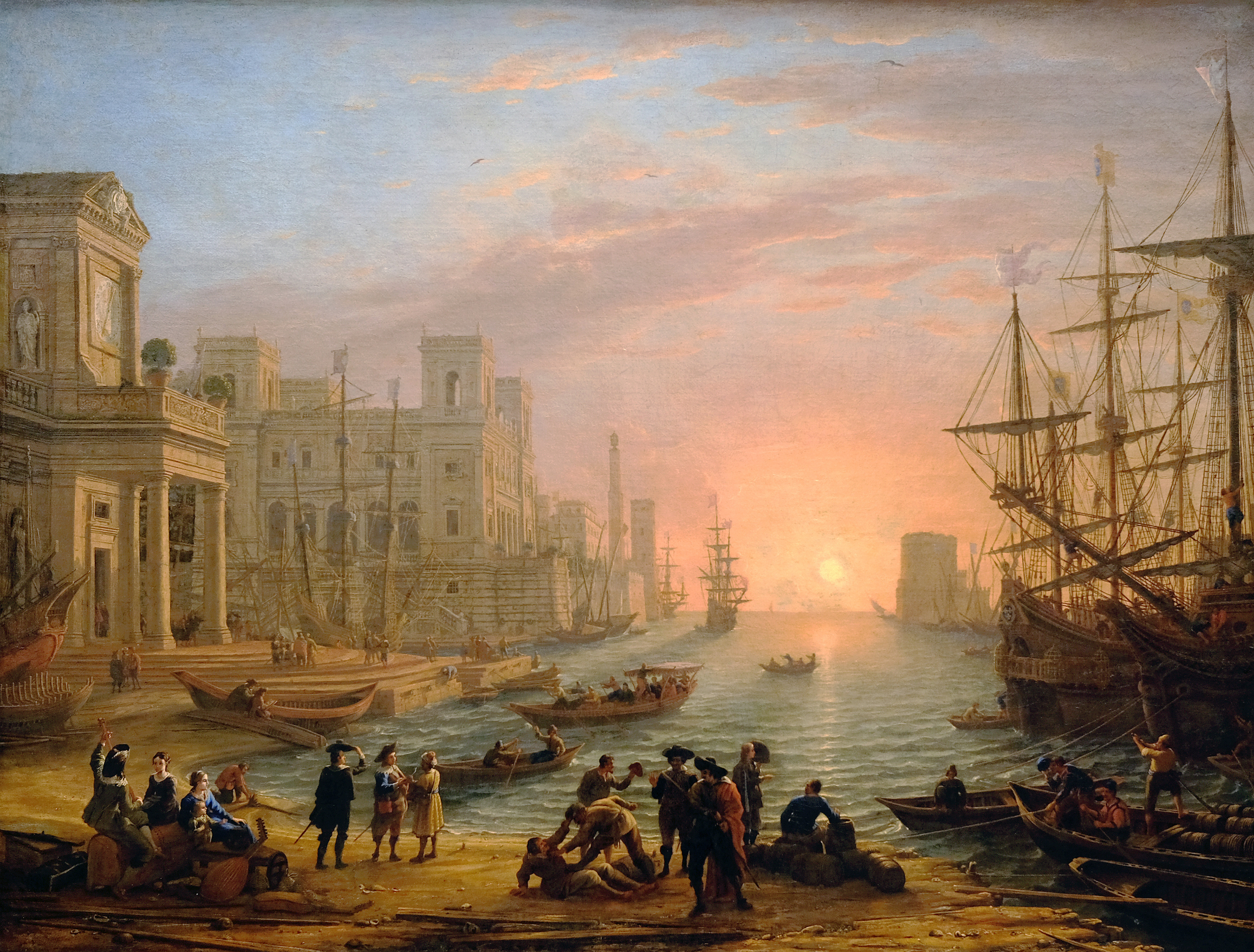
Seaport at sunset (1639), Louvre

He was a prolific creator of drawings in pen and very often monochrome watercolour "wash", usually brown but sometimes grey. Chalk is sometimes used for under-drawing, and white highlighting in various media may be employed, much less often other colours such as pink. These fall into three fairly distinct groups. Firstly, there are numerous sketches, mostly of landscapes, often created on-site; these have been greatly admired, and influenced other artists. Then there are studies for paintings, of various degrees of finish, many clearly done before or during the process of painting, while others were likely made after the painting was completed. This was certainly the case for the last group, the 195 drawings recording finished paintings collected in his Liber Veritatis (now in the British Museum). He produced over 40 etchings, often simplified versions of paintings, mainly before 1642. These served various purposes for him, but are now regarded as much less important than his drawings. He painted frescoes in his early career, which played an important part in making his reputation, but are now nearly all lost.

== Biography ==
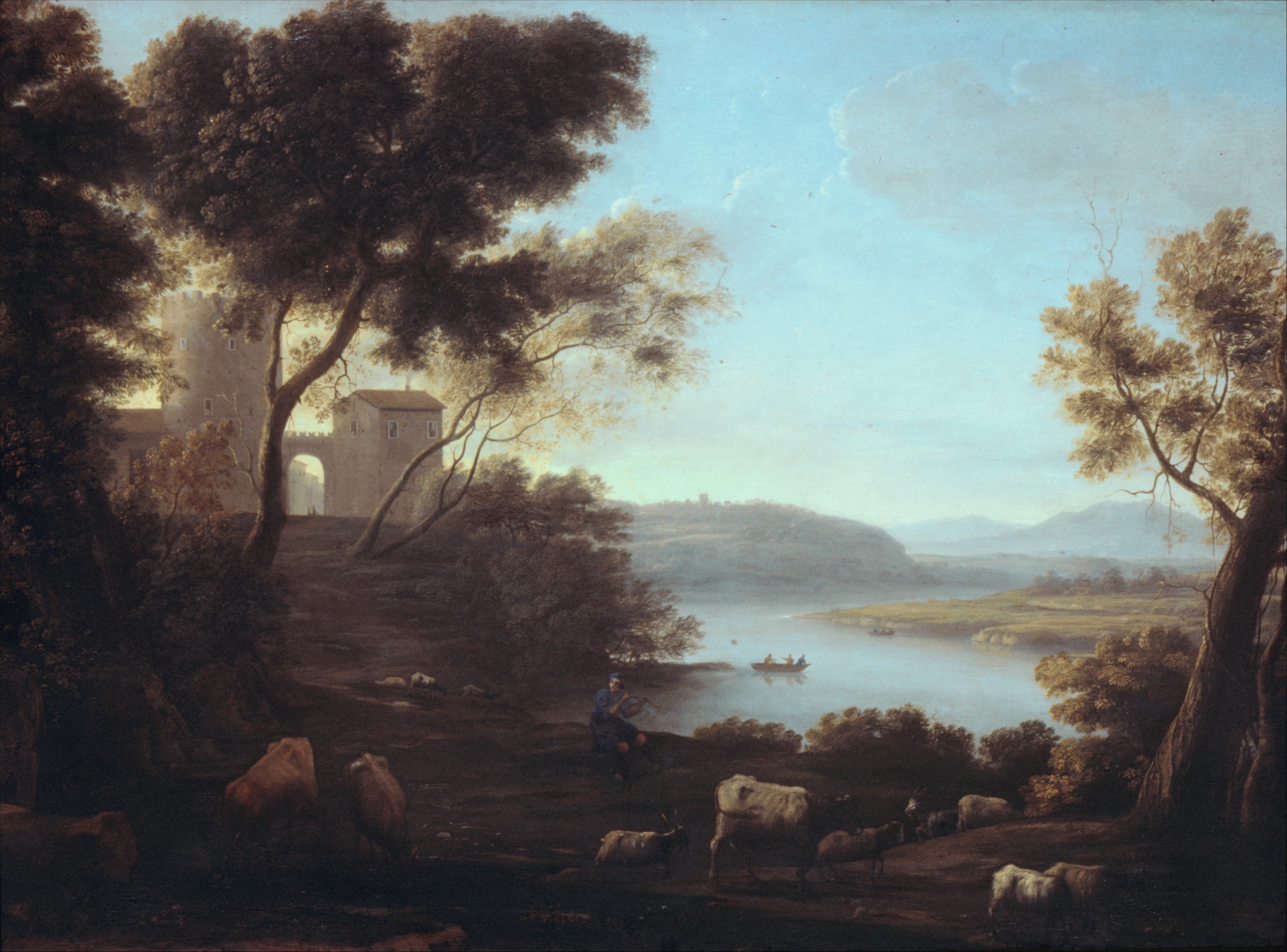
The Roman Campagna (1639), Metropolitan Museum of Art

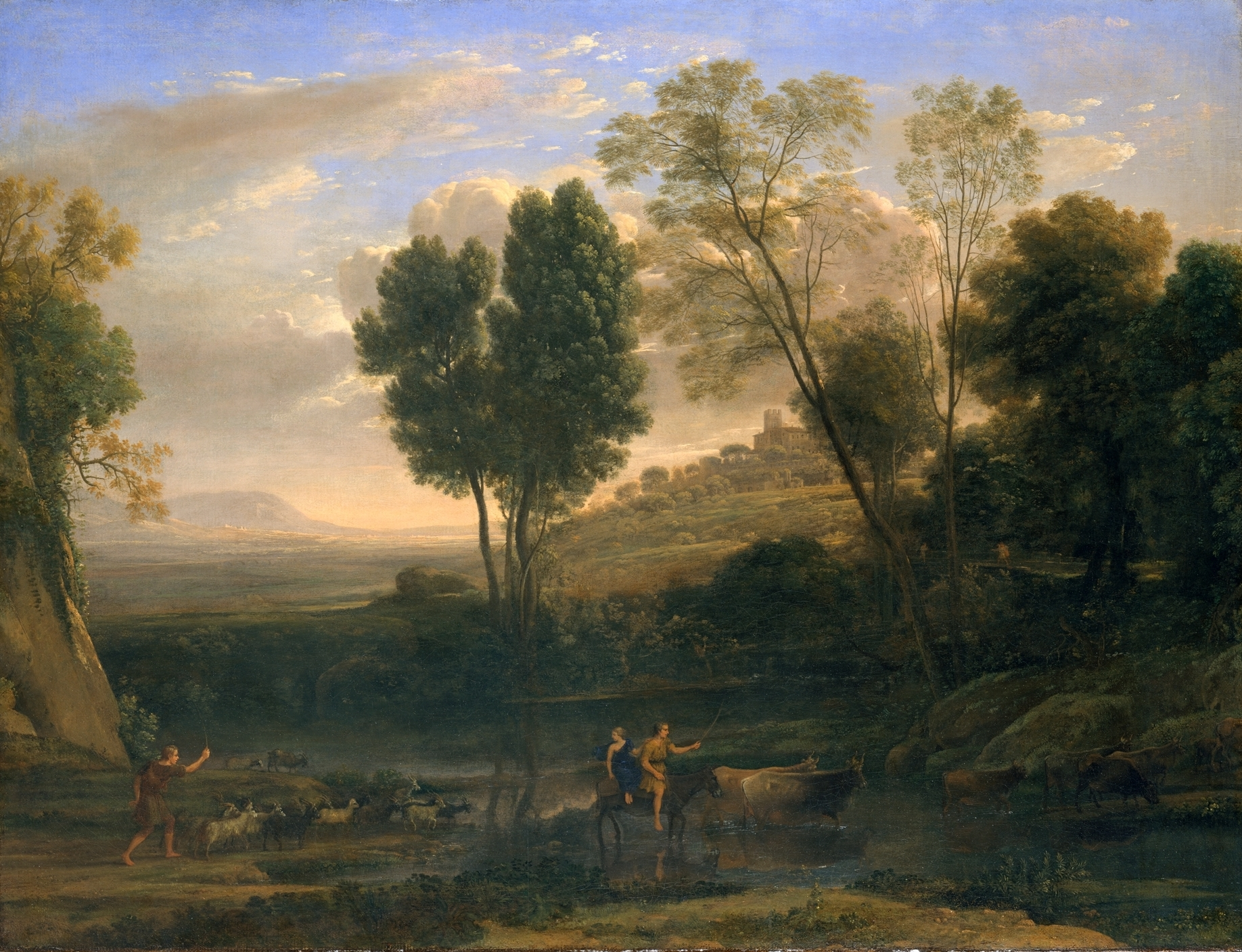
Sunrise (1646–47), Metropolitan Museum of Art

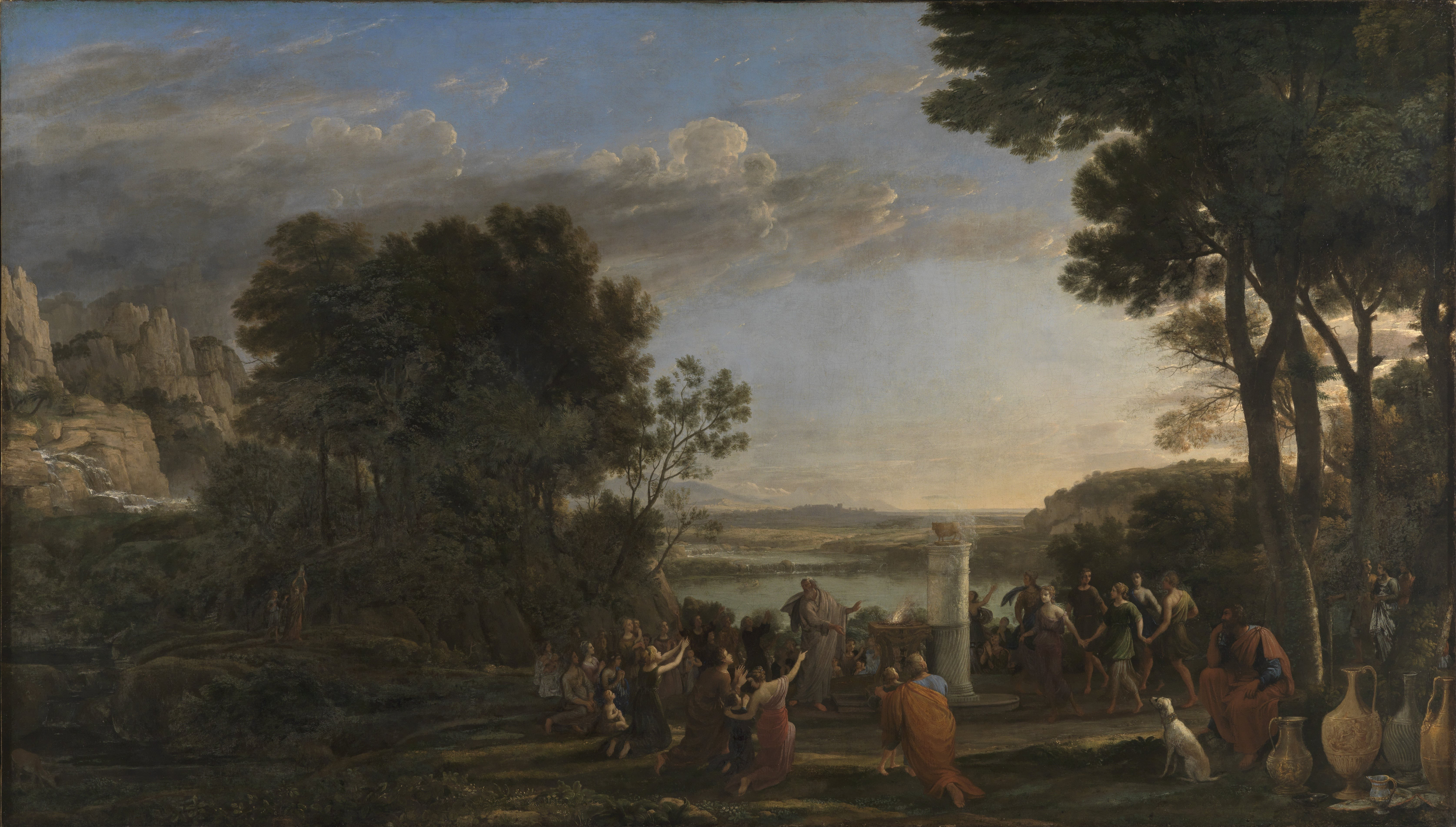
Worship of the Golden Calf (1653), Staatliche Kunsthalle Karlsruhe

The early biographies of Claude are in Joachim von Sandrart's Teutsche Academie (1675) and Filippo Baldinucci's Notizie de' professori del disegno da Cimabue in qua (1682–1728). Both Sandrart and Baldinucci knew the painter personally, but at periods some 50 years apart, respectively at the start of his career and shortly before his death. Sandrart knew him well and lived with him for a while, whereas Baldinucci was probably not intimate with him, and derived much of his information from Claude's nephew, who lived with the artist.

Claude's tombstone gives 1600 as his year of birth, but contemporary sources indicate a later date, circa 1604 or 1605. He was born in the small village of Chamagne, Vosges, then part of the Duchy of Lorraine. He was the third of five sons of Jean Gellée and Anne Padose.

According to Baldinucci, Claude's parents both died when he was twelve years old, and he then lived at Freiburg with an elder brother (Jean Gellée). Jean was an artist specializing in inlay work and taught Claude the rudiments of drawing. Claude then travelled to Italy, first working for Goffredo Wals in Naples, then joining the workshop of Agostino Tassi in Rome.

Sandrart's account of Claude's early years, however, is quite different, and modern scholars generally prefer this, or attempt to combine the two. According to Sandrart, Claude did not do well at the village school and was apprenticed to a pastry baker. With a company of fellow cooks and bakers (Lorraine had a high reputation for pâtisserie), Claude travelled to Rome and was eventually employed as a servant and cook by Tassi, who at some point converted him into an apprentice and taught him drawing and painting. Both Wals and Tassi were landscapists, the former very obscure and producing small works, while Tassi (known as the rapist of Artemisia Gentileschi) had a large workshop specializing in fresco schemes in palaces.

While the details of Claude's pre-1620s life remain unclear, most modern scholars agree that he was apprenticed to Wals around 1620–1622, and to Tassi from circa 1622/23 to 1625. Finally, Baldinucci reports that in 1625 Claude undertook a voyage back to Lorraine to train with Claude Deruet, working on the backgrounds of a lost fresco scheme, but left his studio comparatively soon, in 1626 or 1627. He returned to Rome and settled in a house in the Via Margutta, near the Spanish Steps and Trinità dei Monti, remaining in that neighbourhood for the rest of his life.

On his travels, Claude briefly stayed in Marseille, Genoa, and Venice, and had the opportunity to study nature in France, Italy, and Bavaria. Sandrart met Claude in the late 1620s and reported that by then the artist had a habit of sketching outdoors, particularly at dawn and at dusk, making oil studies on the spot. The first dated painting by Claude, Landscape with Cattle and Peasants (Philadelphia Museum of Art) from 1629, already shows well-developed style and technique. In the next few years his reputation was growing steadily, as evidenced by commissions from the French ambassador in Rome (1633) and Philip IV of Spain (1634–35). Baldinucci reported that a particularly important commission came from Cardinal Guido Bentivoglio, who was impressed by the two landscapes Claude painted for him, and recommended the artist to Pope Urban VIII. Four paintings were made for the Pope in 1635–1638, two large and two small on copper.

From this point, Claude's reputation was secured. He went on to fulfill many important commissions, both Italian and international. About 1636 he started cataloguing his works, making pen and wash drawings of nearly all his pictures as they were completed, although not always variant versions, and on the back of most drawings he wrote the name of the purchaser, not always sufficiently clearly to identify them now. This volume Claude named the Liber Veritatis (Book of Truth).

In 1650, Claude moved to a neighboring house in Via Paolina (today Via del Babuino), where he lived until his death. The artist never married, but adopted an orphan child, Agnese, in 1658; she may well have been Claude's own daughter with a servant of the same name. Sons of Claude's brothers joined the household in 1662 (Jean, son of Denis Gellée) and around 1680 (Joseph, son of Melchior Gellée). In 1663 Claude, who suffered much from gout, fell seriously ill, his condition becoming so serious that he drafted a will, but he managed to recover. He painted less after 1670, but works completed after that date include important pictures such as Coast View with Perseus and the Origin of Coral (1674), painted for the celebrated collector Cardinal Camillo Massimo, and Ascanius Shooting the Stag of Sylvia, Claude's last painting, commissioned by Prince Lorenzo Onofrio Colonna, his most important patron in his last years. The artist died in his house on 23 November 1682. He was originally buried in Trinita dei Monti, but his remains were moved in 1840 to San Luigi dei Francesi.

At his death, he owned only four of his paintings, but most of his drawings. Apart from the Liber Veritatis many of these were in bound volumes, the inventory mentioning 12 bound books and a large "case" or folder of loose sheets. Five or six large bound volumes were left to his heirs including a Tivoli Book, Campagna Book, Early Sketchbook, and an "animal album", all now broken up and dispersed, though as the sheets were numbered their contents have been largely reconstructed by scholars.

== Style and subjects ==
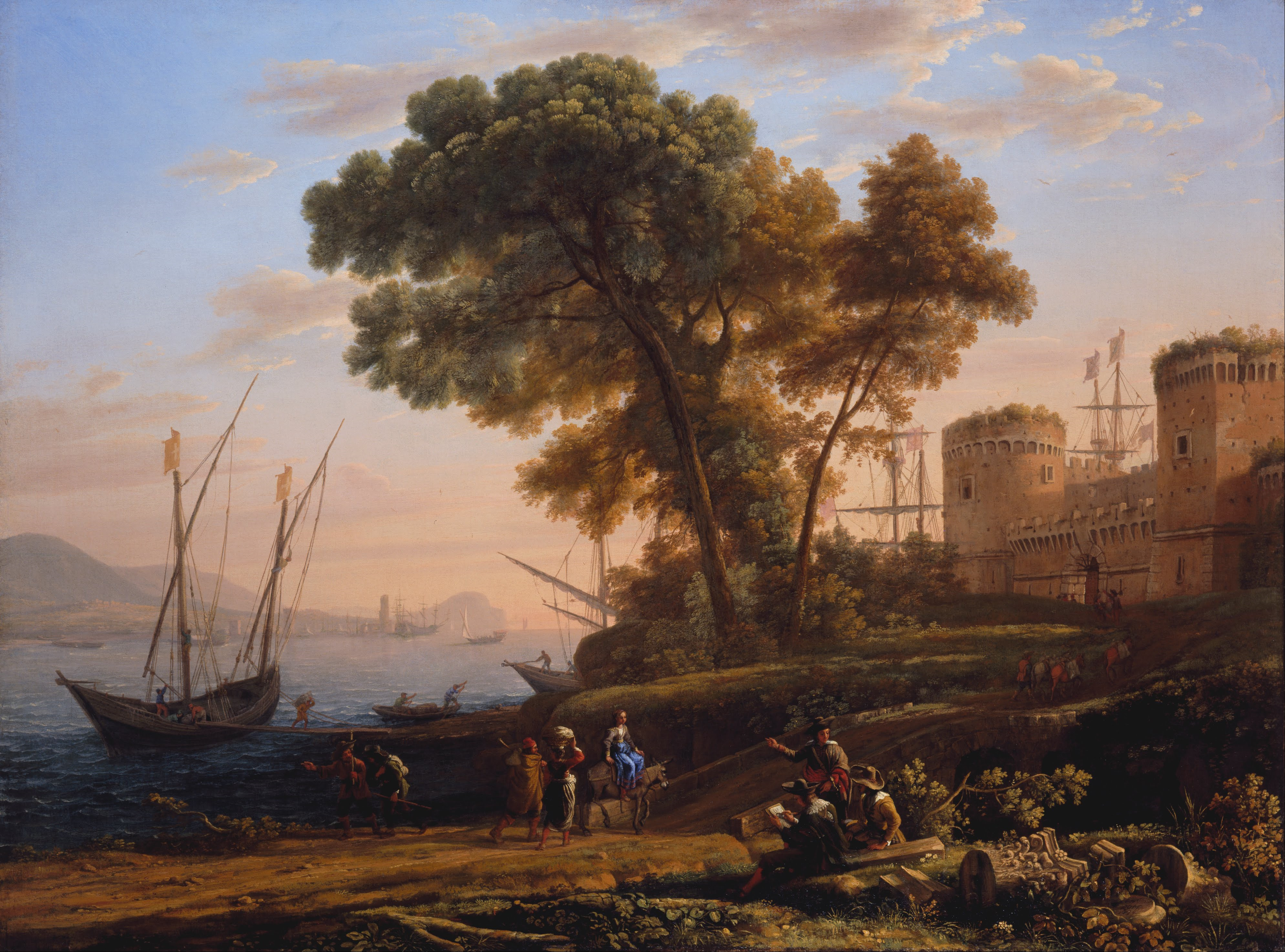
An Artist Studying from Nature, 1639 (Cincinnati Art Museum)

=== Influences ===
Claude's choice of both style and subject matter grew out of a tradition of landscape painting in Italy, mostly Rome, led by northern artists trained in the style of Northern Mannerism. Matthijs Bril had arrived in Rome from Antwerp around 1575, and was soon joined by his brother Paul. Both specialized in landscapes, initially as backgrounds in large frescos, a route apparently also taken by Lorrain some decades later. Matthijs died at 33 but Paul remained active in Rome until after Claude's arrival there, although any meeting between them has not been recorded. Hans Rottenhammer and Adam Elsheimer were other northern landscapists associated with Bril, who had left Rome long before.

These artists introduced the genre of small cabinet pictures, often on copper, where the figures were dominated by their landscape surroundings, which were very often dense woodland placed not far behind figures in the foreground. Paul Bril had begun to paint larger pictures where the size and balance between the elements, and the type of landscape used, is closer to Claude's work in the future, with an extensive open view behind much of the width of the picture.

Along with other seventeenth-century artists working in Rome, Claude was also influenced by the new interest in the genre of landscape that emerged in the mid-to-late sixteenth century within the Veneto; starting with the Venetian born painter Domenico Campagnola and the Dutch artist resident in both Padua and Venice, Lambert Sustris. Interest in landscape first emerged in Rome in the work of their Brescian pupil Girolamo Muziano, who earned the nickname in the city of Il giovane dei paesi (the young man of the landscapes). Following the integration of this tradition with other Northern sources, Bolognese artists such as Domenichino, who was in Rome from 1602, painted a number of "Landscape with..." subjects, drawn from mythology, religion and literature, as well as genre scenes. These usually have an open vista in one part of the composition, as well as a steep hill in another. Even when the action between the few small figures is violent, the landscape gives an impression of serenity. The compositions are careful and balanced, and look forward to Claude's. The Landscape with the Flight into Egypt by Annibale Carracci (c. 1604) is one of the best Italian landscapes of the start of the century, but perhaps more a forerunner of Nicolas Poussin than Claude.

In his method, Lorrain would often use a grid of median and diagonal lines to place elements in the landscape in order to create a dynamic and harmonious composition in which landscape and architecture are balanced against empty space.

=== Early works ===
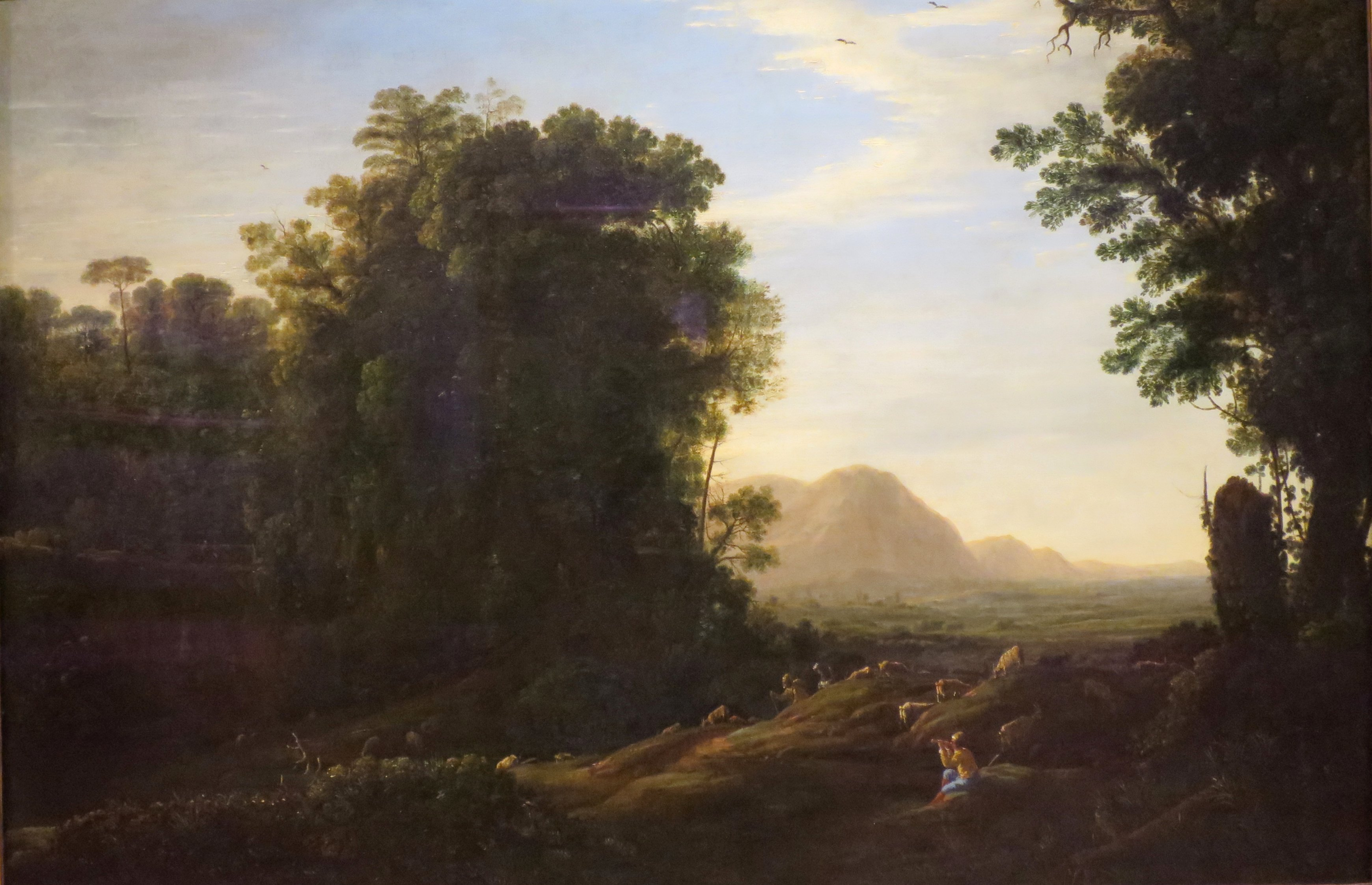
Landscape with a Piping Shepherd, c. 1629–1632

Claude's earliest paintings draw from both these groups, being mostly rather smaller than later. Agostino Tassi may have been a pupil of Paul Bril, and his influence is especially evident in Claude's earliest works, at a larger size, while some small works of about 1631 recall Elsheimer. Initially Claude often includes more figures than was typical of his predecessors, despite his figure drawing being generally recognised as "notoriously feeble", as Roger Fry put it.

More often than later, the figures were mere genre staffage: shepherds, travellers, and sailors, as appropriate for the scene. In the early 1630s the first religious and mythological subjects appear, with a Flight into Egypt probably of 1631, and a Judgement of Paris, both very common subjects in the "Landscape with.." genre. The pair to the latter is a very early harbour scene, already with tall classical buildings, a type of composition Claude was to use for the rest of his career.

== Figures and other non-landscape elements ==
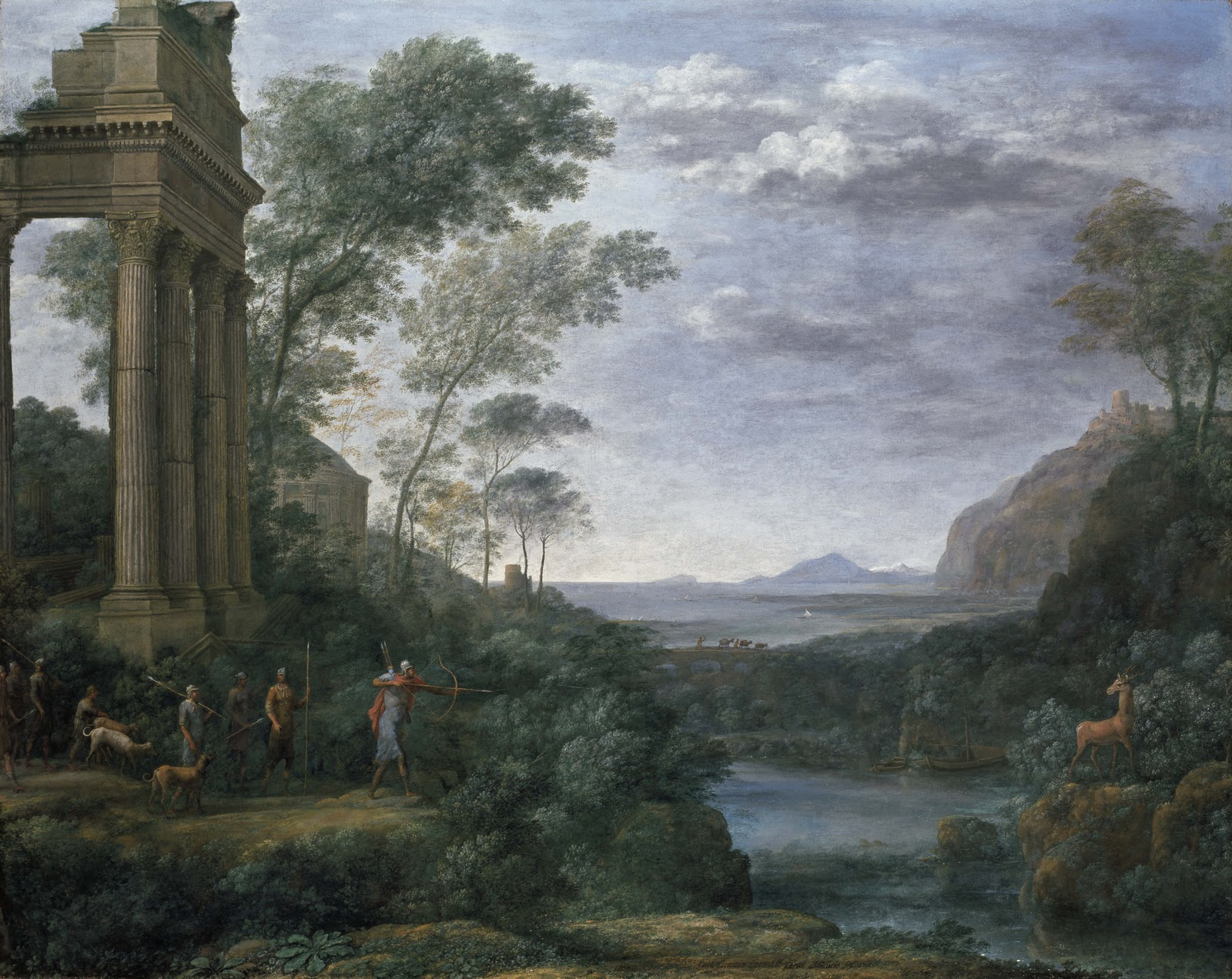
Landscape with Ascanius Shooting the Stag of Sylvia (1682), Claude's last painting

=== Figures ===
Although virtually every painting contains figures, even if only a shepherd, their weakness has always been recognised, not least by Claude himself; according to Baldinucci he joked that he charged for his landscapes, but gave the figures for free. According to Sandrart he had made considerable efforts to improve, but without success; certainly there are numerous studies, typically for groups of figures, among his drawings. It has often been thought that he handed the figures in some works over to others to paint, but it is now generally agreed that there are few such cases. Baldinucci mentions Filippo Lauri in this context, but he was only born in 1623, and can only have taken on such work from the 1640s at best. The rider in the small Landscape with an Imaginary View of Tivoli in the Courtauld Gallery in London, LV 67 and dated 1642, is one of the later of his figures to wear contemporary dress. Thereafter all of them wore "pastoral dress" or the 17th-century idea of ancient dress.

In his last years his figures tend to become ever more elongated, a process taken to an extreme in his last painting Ascanius Shooting the Stag of Sylvia, of which even its owner, the Ashmolean Museum, says "The hunters are impossibly elongated – Ascanius, in particular, is absurdly top-heavy". Its pendant View of Carthage with Dido and Aeneas (1676, Kunsthalle, Hamburg) has figures almost as extreme. With the mid-20th fashion for medical diagnosis through art, it was suggested that Claude had developed an optical condition accounting for such effects, but this has been rejected by doctors and critics alike.

=== Architecture ===
Claude only rarely painted topographical scenes showing the Renaissance and Baroque Roman architecture still being created in his lifetime, but often borrowed from it to work up imaginary buildings. Most of the buildings near the foreground of his paintings are grand imagined temples and palaces in a generally classical style, but without the attempt at archaeological rigour seen in Poussin's equivalents. Elements are borrowed and worked up from real buildings, both ancient and modern, and in the absence of much knowledge of what an ancient palace facade looked like, his palaces are more like the late Renaissance Roman palaces many of his clients lived in. Buildings that are less clearly seen, such as the towers that often emerge above trees in his backgrounds, are often more like the vernacular and medieval buildings he would have seen around Rome.

One example of a semi-topographic painting with "modern" buildings (there are rather more such drawings) is A View of Rome (1632, NG 1319), which seems to represent the view from the roof of Claude's house, including his parish church and initial burial place of Santa Trinita del Monte, and other buildings such as the Quirinal Palace. This view takes up the left-hand side of the painting, but on the right, behind a group of genre figures in modern dress (uniquely for Claude, these represent a scene of prostitution in the Dutch Merry Company tradition), is a statue of Apollo and a Roman temple portico, both of which are either wholly imaginary or at least not placed in their actual locations.

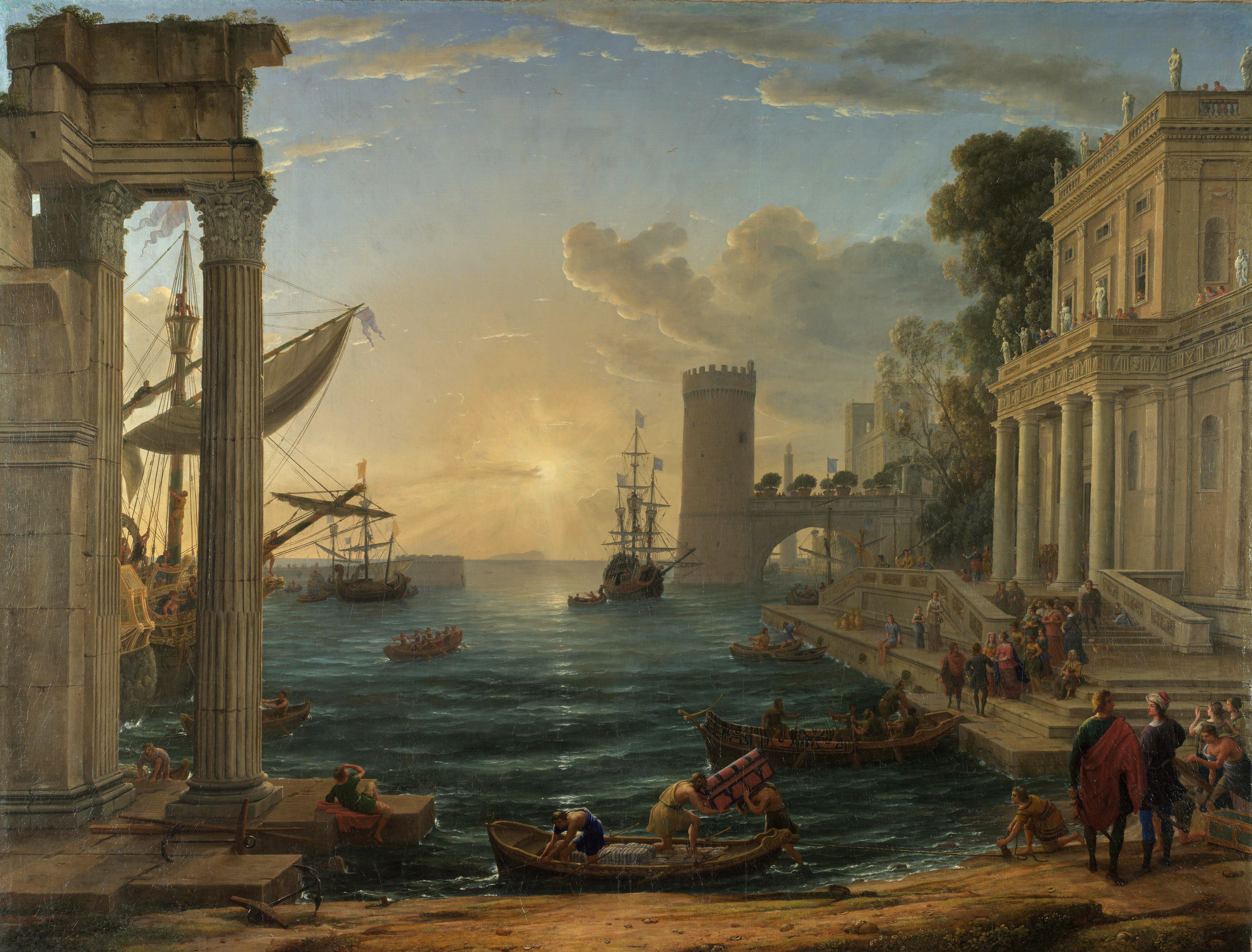
The Embarkation of the Queen of Sheba (1648), National Gallery

In a generic Seaport in the National Gallery (1644, NG5) a palace façade expanding on the gateway built about 1570 between the Farnese Gardens and the Roman Forum is next door to the Arch of Titus, here apparently part of another palace. Behind that Claude repeats a palace he had used before, that borrows from several buildings in and around Rome, including the Villa Farnesina and the Palazzo Senatorio. It is pointless to question how Ascanius finds in Latium a large stone temple in a fully developed Corinthian order, that has evidently been crumbling into ruins for several centuries.

=== Shipping ===
Claude's lack of interest in avoiding anachronism is perhaps seen most clearly in the ships in his harbour scenes. Whether the subject, and the dress of the figures, is supposed to be contemporary, mythogical or from Roman or medieval history, the large ships are usually the same up-to-date merchant vessels. Some large rowed galleys are seen, as in Landscape with the Arrival of Aeneas before the City of Pallanteum (one of the "Altieri Claudes", Anglesey Abbey), where Virgil's text specifies galleys. Ships in the background are more likely to attempt to reflect an ancient setting; in the London Seaport with the Embarkation of the Queen of Sheba (1648, NG 14) the ship at the centre of the composition is modern, the others less so.

== Critical assessment and legacy ==
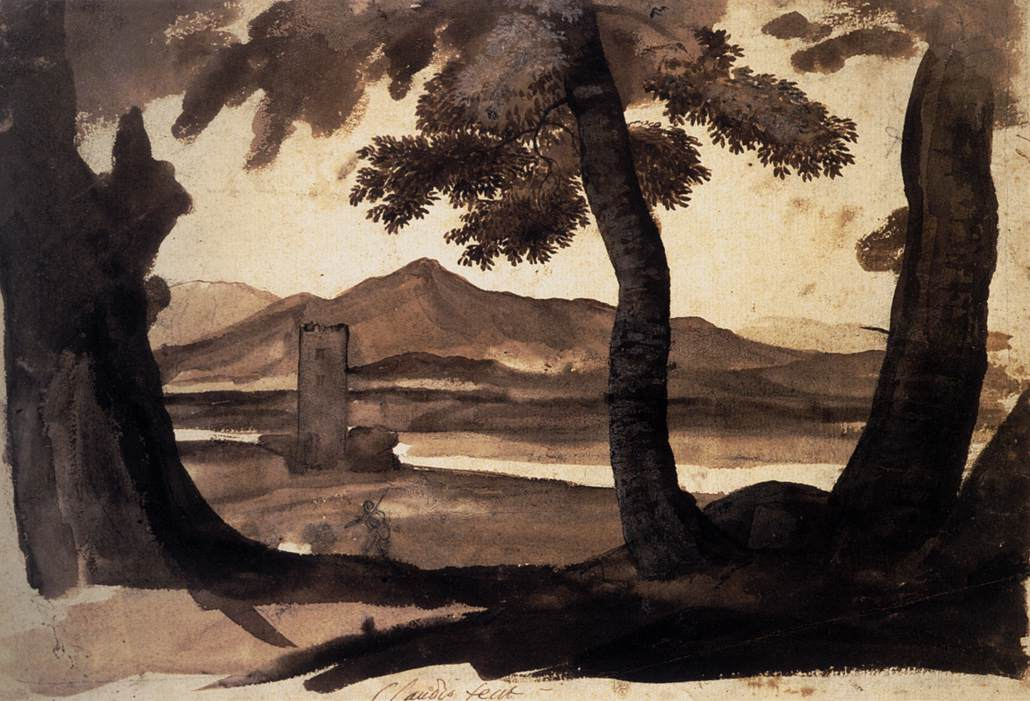
Wash drawing of a view of the Campagna

As seen in his painting The Embarkation of the Queen of Sheba, Claude was innovative in including the Sun itself as a source of light in his paintings.

In Rome, Bril, Girolamo Muziano and Federico Zuccaro and later Elsheimer, Annibale Carracci, and Domenichino made landscape vistas pre-eminent in some of their drawings and paintings (as well as Da Vinci in his private drawings or Baldassarre Peruzzi in his decorative frescoes of vedute); but it might be argued that not until Claude's generation, did landscape completely reflect an aesthetic viewpoint which was seen as completely autonomous in its moral purpose within the cultural world of Rome.

In this matter of the importance of landscape, Claude was prescient. Living in a pre-Romantic era, he did not depict those uninhabited panoramas that were to be esteemed in later centuries, such as with Salvator Rosa. He painted a pastoral world of fields and valleys not distant from castles and towns. If the ocean horizon is represented, it is from the setting of a busy port. Perhaps to feed the public need for paintings with noble themes, his pictures include demigods, heroes and saints, even though his abundant drawings and sketchbooks prove that he was more interested in scenography.

Claude Lorrain was described as kind to his pupils and hard-working; keenly observant, but an unlettered man until his death.

John Constable described Claude as "the most perfect landscape painter the world ever saw", and declared that in Claude's landscape "all is lovely – all amiable – all is amenity and repose; the calm sunshine of the heart".

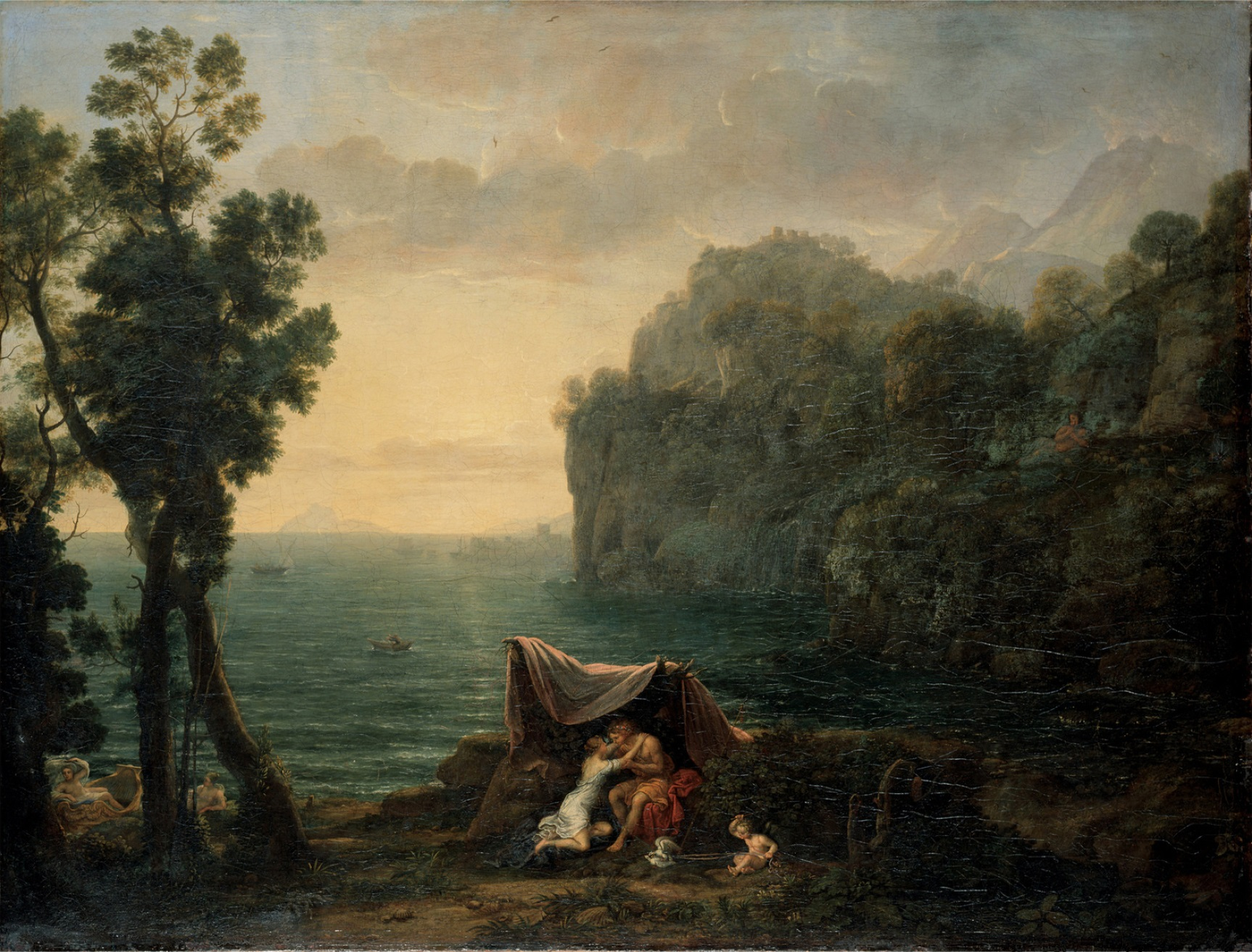
Coastal landscape with Acis and Galatea (1657) in the Gemäldegalerie Alte Meister

In Dostoevsky's novel Demons, the character Stavrogin praises Claude's painting in Dresden's Gemäldegalerie Alte Meister:

In the Dresden gallery there is a picture by Claude Lorraine, called in the catalogue, I think, 'Acis and Galatea,' but I always called it 'The Golden Age,' I don't know why. I had seen it before, but about three days ago, as I passed through Dresden, I saw it again. I even went on purpose to have a look at it, and possibly for this alone I stopped at Dresden. It was that picture I dreamt of, but not as of a picture, but as of a reality. A corner of the Greek Archipelago; blue caressing waves, islands and rocks; fertile shore, a magic vista on the horizon, the appeal of the setting sun—no words could describe it. Here was the cradle of European man, here were the first scenes of the mythological world, here its green paradise...Here had once lived a beautiful race. They rose and went to sleep happy and innocent; they filled the woods with their joyful songs; the great abundance of their virgin powers went out into love and into simple happiness. The sun bathed these islands and sea in its beams, rejoicing in its beautiful children. Wonderful dream, splendid illusion! A dream the most incredible of all that had ever been dreamt, but upon it the whole of mankind has lavished all its powers throughout history; for this it has made every sacrifice, for this men have died on the cross and their prophets have been killed; without this, nations will not live and are unable even to die. I lived through all these feelings in my dream; I do not know what exactly I dreamt about, but the rocks, the sea, and the slanting rays of the setting sun—all these seemed to be still visible to me, when I woke and opened my eyes and, for the first time in my life, found them full of tears. A feeling of happiness, until then unfamiliar to me, went through my whole heart, even painfully.

== Claude glass ==
The Claude glass, named after Lorrain in England although there is no indication he used or knew of it or anything similar, gave a framed and dark-tinted reflection of a real view, that was supposed to help artists produce works of art similar to his, and tourists to adjust views to a Claudian formula. William Gilpin, the inventor of the picturesque ideal, advocated the use of a Claude glass saying, "they give the object of nature a soft, mellow tinge like the colouring of that Master."

Claude glasses were widely used by tourists and amateur artists, who quickly became the targets of satire. Hugh Sykes Davies observed their facing away from the object they wished to paint, commenting "It is very typical of their attitude to Nature that such a position should be desirable."

== Selected works ==
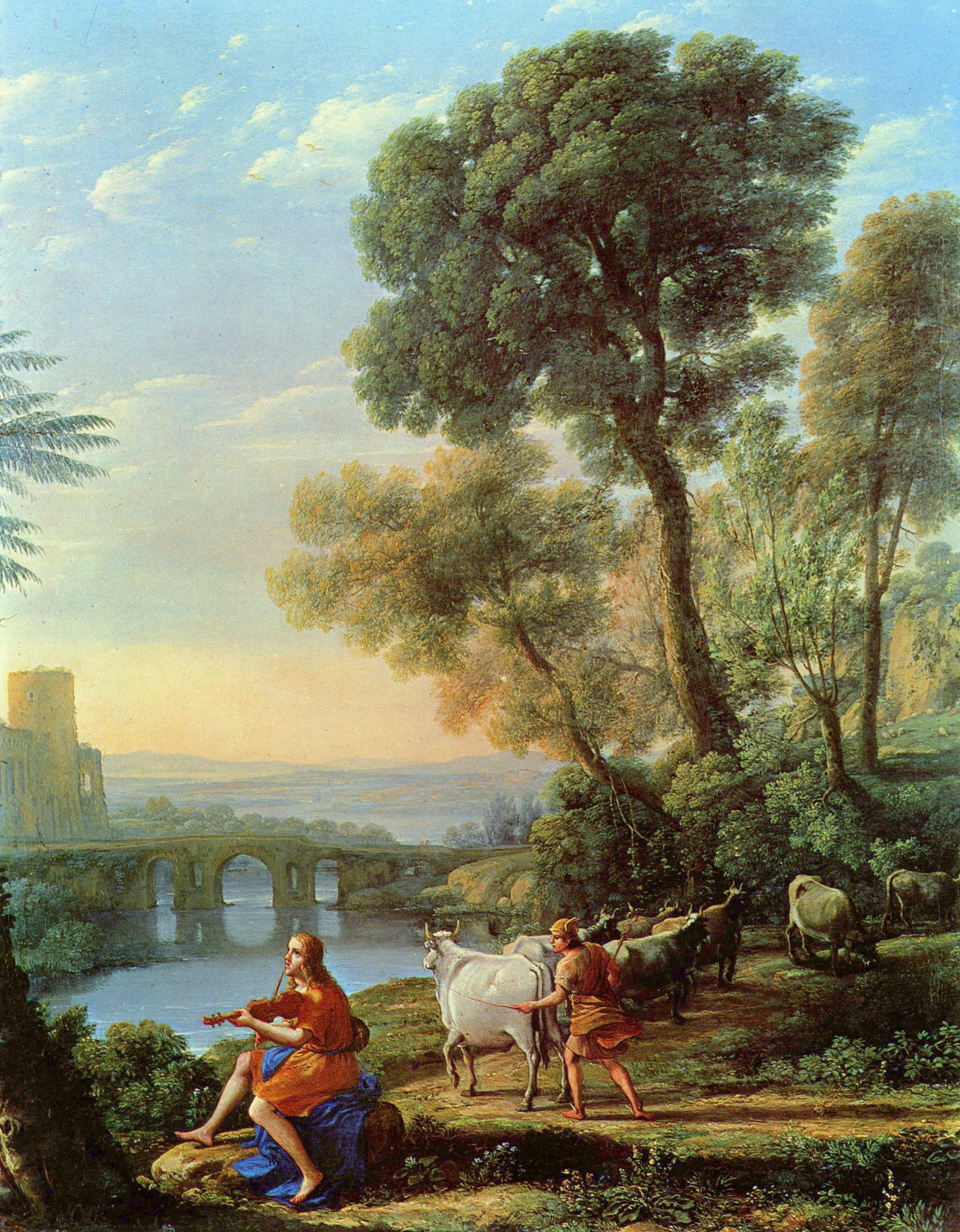
Landscape with Apollo Guarding the Herds of Admetus and Mercury stealing them (1645), Doria Pamphilj Gallery

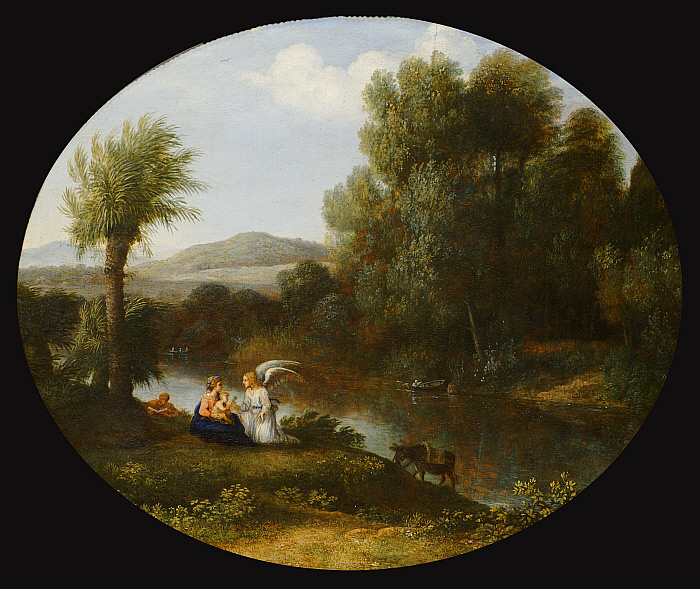
Rest on the Flight into Egypt (1646), oil on canvas, 12 11/16 x 14 15/16 in. (32.2 x 38 cm), Clark Art Institute

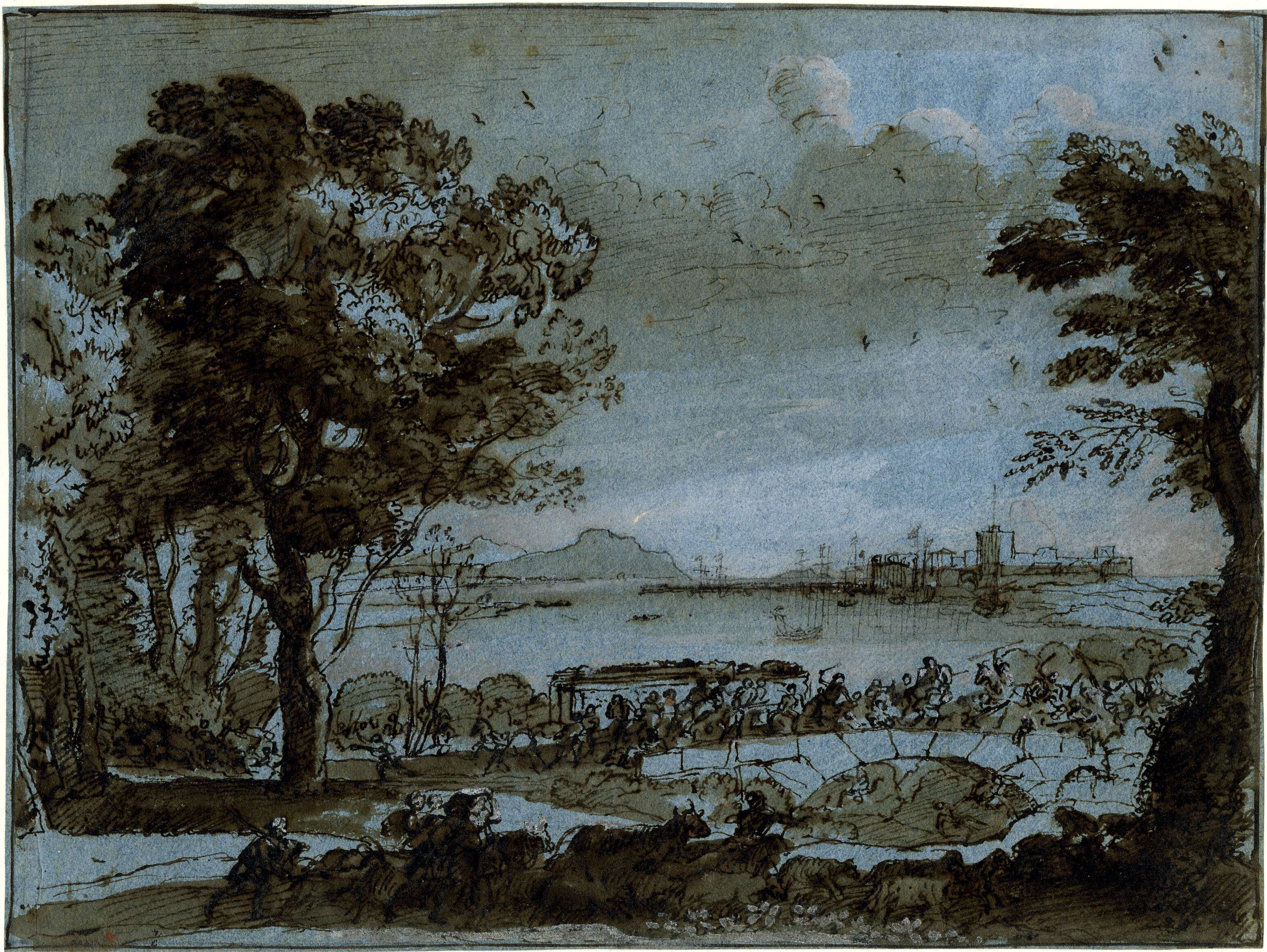
Liber Veritatis 137, Coast scene with a battle on a bridge , of which two painted versions are known

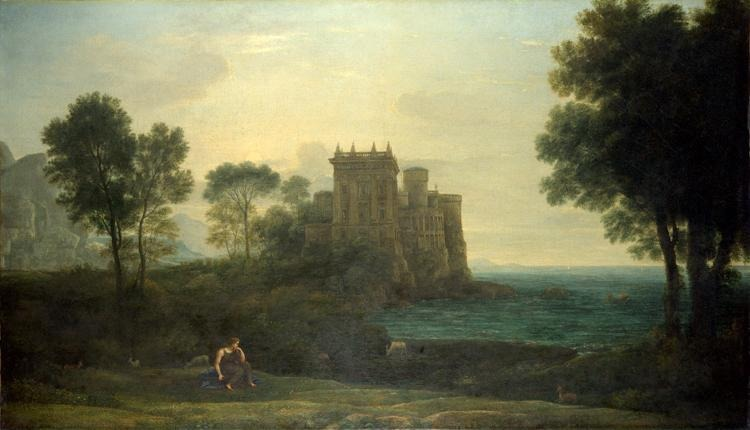
Landscape with Psyche Outside the Palace of Cupid (The Enchanted Castle) (1664), National Gallery

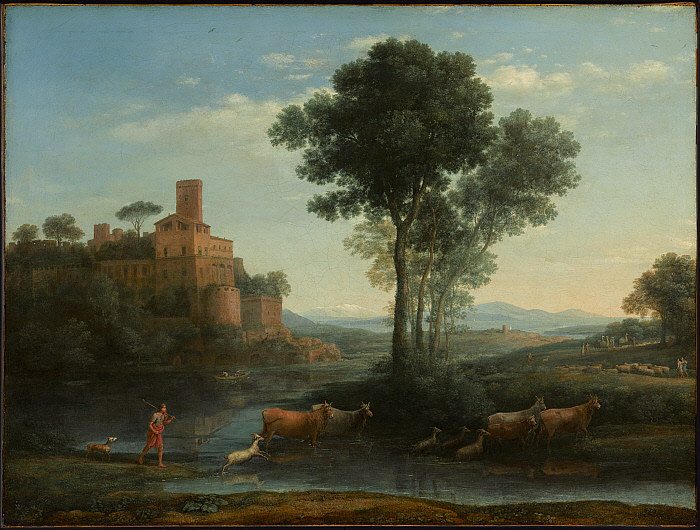
Landscape with the Voyage of Jacob (1677), oil on canvas, 28 1/16 x 37 7/16 in. (71.2 x 95.1 cm), Clark Art Institute

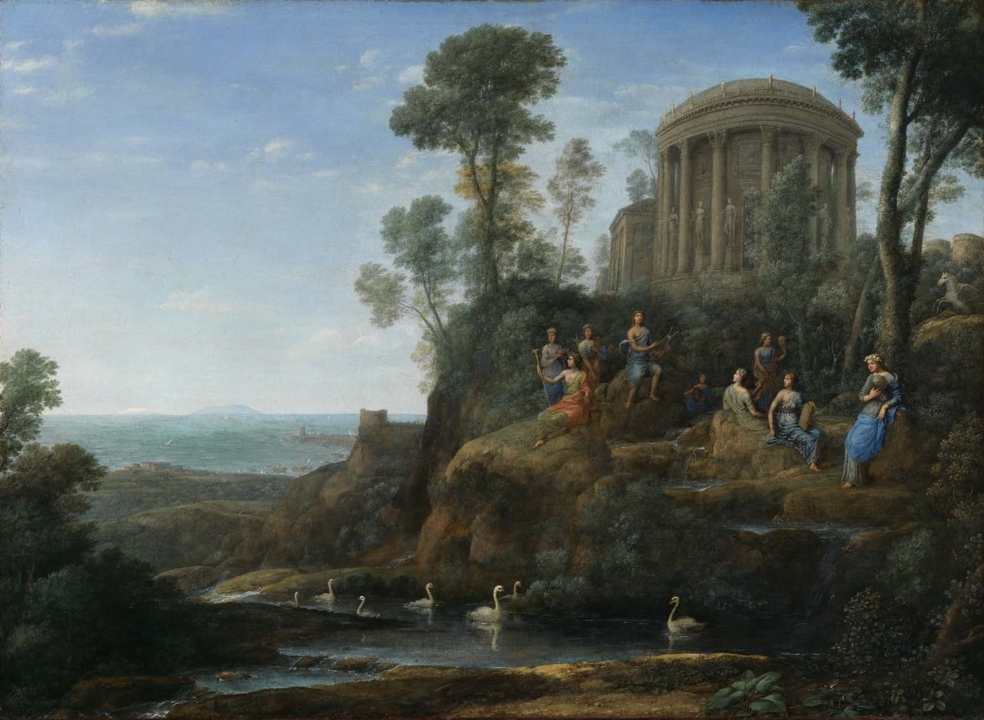
Apollo and the Muses on Mount Helicon (1680) Museum of Fine Arts, Boston

- The Flight into Egypt (1635) oil on canvas. Indianapolis Museum of Art
- Landscape with Goatherd (1636) - National Gallery, London
- The Ford (1636) - Metropolitan Museum, New York
- Port with Villa Medici (1637) - Galleria degli Uffizi, Florence
- Finding of Moses (1638) - Oil on canvas, 209 x 138 cm, Museo del Prado, Madrid
- Landscape with Merchants (The Shipwreck) (c.1638) - National Gallery of Art, Washington, D.C.
- Pastoral Landscape, (1638) - Minneapolis Institute of Arts
- Paysage avec le port de Santa Marinella, (1638) - Petit Palais
- Seaport (1639) - National Gallery, London
- Seaport at Sunset (Odysseus) (1639) - Oil on canvas, 119 x 150 cm, Louvre, Paris
- Village Fête, (1639) - Oil on canvas, 103 x 135 cm, Louvre, Paris
- View of Campagna (c. 1639) - Oil on canvas, 101.6 x 135.9 cm, Royal Collection
- Embarkation of Saint Paula Romana at Ostia (1639) - Oil on canvas, 211 x 145 cm, Museo del Prado, Madrid
- The Embarkation of St. Ursula (1641) - National Gallery, London
- The Disembarkation of Cleopatra at Tarsus (1642) - oil on canvas, Louvre, Paris.
- The Disembarkation of Cleopatra at Tarsus (1642–43) - Oil on canvas, 119 x 170 cm, Louvre, Paris
- The Trojan Women Setting Fire to their Fleet (c. 1643) - oil on canvas. Metropolitan Museum of Art, NY
- Brook and Two Bridges - Oil on canvas, 74 x 58 cm,
- Voyage of Jacob
- The Angel's Visit
- View of the Church Santa Trinità Dei Monti - drawing, Hermitage Museum, St. Petersburg
- Seaport with Castle - Howard University Gallery of Art, Washington D.C.
- View of Tivoli at Sunset (1644) – Fine Arts Museums of San Francisco
- Mercury Stealing Apollo's Oxen (1645) - Oil on canvas, 55 x 45 cm, Galleria Doria-Pamphilj, Rome
- Landscape with Cephalus and Procris reunited by Diana (1645) - Oil on canvas, 102 x 132 cm, National Gallery, London
- The Judgement of Paris (1645–46) - National Gallery of Art, Washington D.C.
- Rest on the Flight into Egypt (1646) - oil on canvas, 12 11/16 x 14 15/16 in. (32.2 x 38 cm), Clark Art Institute
- Sunrise (1646–47) - Metropolitan Museum of Art, New York
- The Embarkation of the Queen of Sheba (1648) - National Gallery, London
- Marriage of Isaac and Rebekah (1648) - National Gallery, London
- Landscape with Paris and Oenone (1648) - Oil on canvas, 119 x 150 cm, Louvre, Paris
- Landscape with Dancing Figures (The Mill) (1648) - Oil on canvas, 150,6 x 197,8 cm, Galleria Doria-Pamphili, Rome
- View of La Crescenza (1648–50) - Oil on canvas, 38.7 x 58.1 cm, Metropolitan Museum of Art, New York
- Landscape with Apollo and the Cumaean Sybil (c. 1650) - Oil on canvas, 99,5 x 125 cm, Hermitage Museum, St. Petersburg
- The Rest on the Flight into Egypt (1651 or 1661) - Oil on canvas, 113 x 157 cm, Hermitage Museum, St. Petersburg
- Landscape with Mercury and Battus (1654) - Oil on canvas, 74 x 98 cm, Swiss private collection
- Landscape with Hagar and the Angel (1654) - Oil on canvas, 54.5 x 76 cm, Dunedin Public Art Gallery, Dunedin
- Landscape with Acis and Galatea (1657) - Oil on canvas, 100 x 135 cm, Gemäldegalerie Alte Meister, Dresden
- Landscape with Apollo and Mercury (1660) - Oil on canvas, 74,5 x 110,5 cm, Wallace Collection, London
- Landscape with a dance (The Marriage of Isaac and Rebeccah) (1663) – Drawing, Royal Collection
- The Father of Psyche Sacrificing at the Temple of Apollo (1663)- Oil on canvas, 5'9" x 7'5", one of the Altieri Claudes Anglesey Abbey, UK
- Landscape with Psyche Outside the Palace of Cupid (1664)- Oil on canvas, National Gallery, London
- Coast Scene with the Rape of Europa (1667) - Oil on canvas, 134,6 x 101,6 cm, Royal Collection, London
- The Expulsion of Hagar (1668) - Oil on canvas, 107 x 140 cm, Alte Pinakothek, Munich
- Landscape with Jacob Wrestling with the Angel or Night (1672) Oil on canvas, Hermitage Museum, St. Petersburg, Russia
- Seaport (1674) - Oil on canvas, 72 x 96 cm, Alte Pinakothek, Munich
- The Landing of Aeneas (1675) - Oil on canvas 5'9" x 7'5", one of the Altieri Claudes Anglesey Abbey, UK
- Landscape with the Voyage of Jacob (1677) - oil on canvas, 28 1/16 x 37 7/16 in. (71.2 x 95.1 cm), Clark Art Institute
- Apollo and the Muses on Mount Helicon (1680) - Oil on canvas 99.7 x 136.5 cm, Museum of Fine Arts, Boston (12.1050)
- Ascanius Shooting the Stag of Sylvia (1682) - Ashmolean Museum, Oxford.
- View of a Seaport - Huntington Library, San Marino, California
- Landscape with Mercury, Argus and Lo (1662) – etching on laid paper, Utah Museum of Fine Arts

== See also ==
- Claude glass – Black mirror
