= Village Fête (Claude Lorrain) =

Painting by Claude Lorrain

Village Fête (La Fête villageoise)
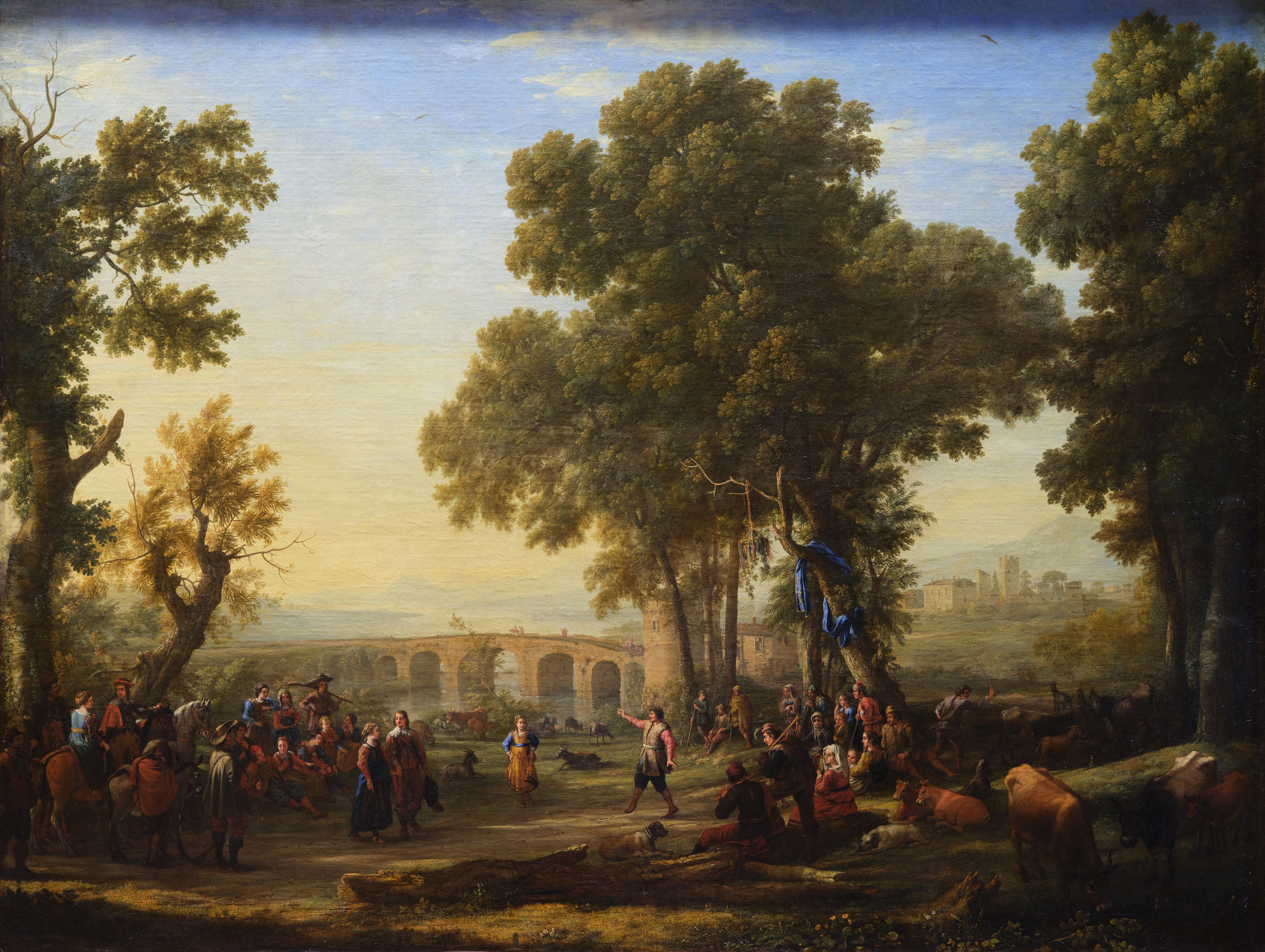
- Artist: Claude Lorrain
- Year: 1639 (Signed and dated: Claude inv. Romae 1639)
- Medium: Oil on canvas
- Dimensions: 103 cm × 135 cm (41 in × 53 in)
- Location: Louvre; Paris

Village Fête (or in Fr. La Fête villageoise) is an oil-on-canvas painting of a village fête by the French Baroque painter Claude Lorrain (real name Claude Gellée), painted in 1639 and given to Louis XIV in 1693 together with its companion Seaport at Sunset, by the landscape architect and gardener André Le Nôtre. It is now in the Louvre, in Paris.

== History ==
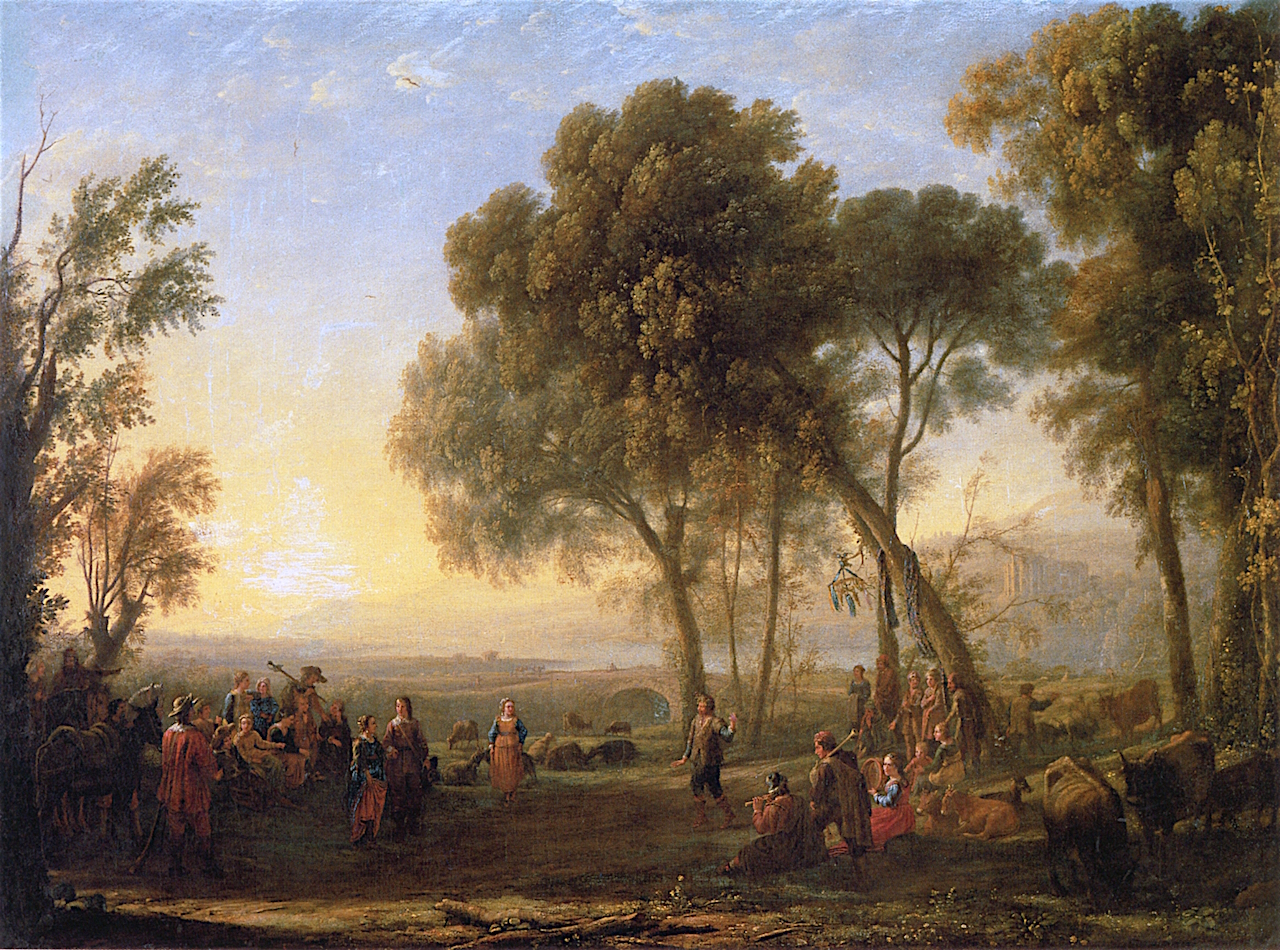
Landscape with Rural Dance, c. 1637

Claude's Liber Veritatis, a register in which he recorded and drew the paintings he had done, has a note on the back of the drawing for the Fête (No. 13) that the picture had been painted for Urban VIII. Other sources also state that the artist painted a Village Fête and a Seaport at Sunset for Urban VIII, but these two paintings were sold by Prince Barberini in 1798. The Louvre painting must therefore be a replica painted by Claude Lorrain after the lost original. Another copy is in the possession of Lord Yarborough in England (called Landscape with Rural Dance), and yet another was in the Stroganov collection, St. Petersburg. Several other replicas and copies exist.

This particular painting, painted fairly early in the artist's career, reveals the influence of Flemish art. The composition, with a group of trees in the centre, and openings on either side through which the light appears, was often used by Flemish landscape painters from the time of Bruegel: Paul and Matthew Bril frequently employed it, and Lorrain continued in their tradition in Rome. In accordance with classic 16th century procedure, the bridge harmoniously unites the middle and far distance. Through the opening on the right can be seen a city bathed in a golden mist, more characteristic of the campagna romana (Roman countryside) than of the North. Following the usual practice of studios of the Low Countries, Lorrain often employed other artists to paint the staffage or small figures in his pictures; but this does not seem to have been the case here, to judge by the unity of conception between figures and landscape.

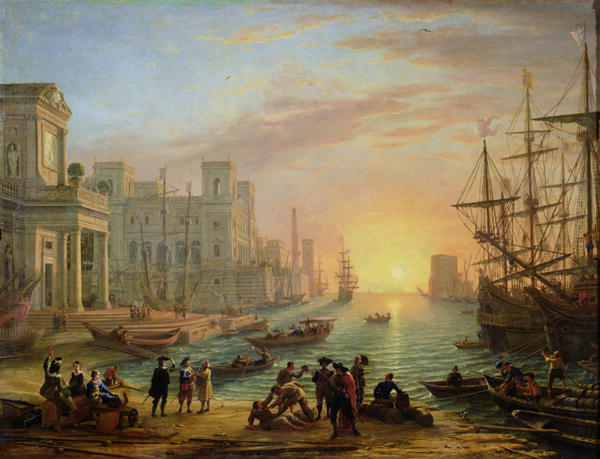
The Seaport at Sunset by Lorrain, at the National Gallery, London (1639)

== See also ==
- Black mirror
- Landscape art
- Lost artworks
