= The Trojan Women Set Fire to their Fleet =

Painting by Claude Lorrain

The Trojan Women Setting Fire to Their Fleet
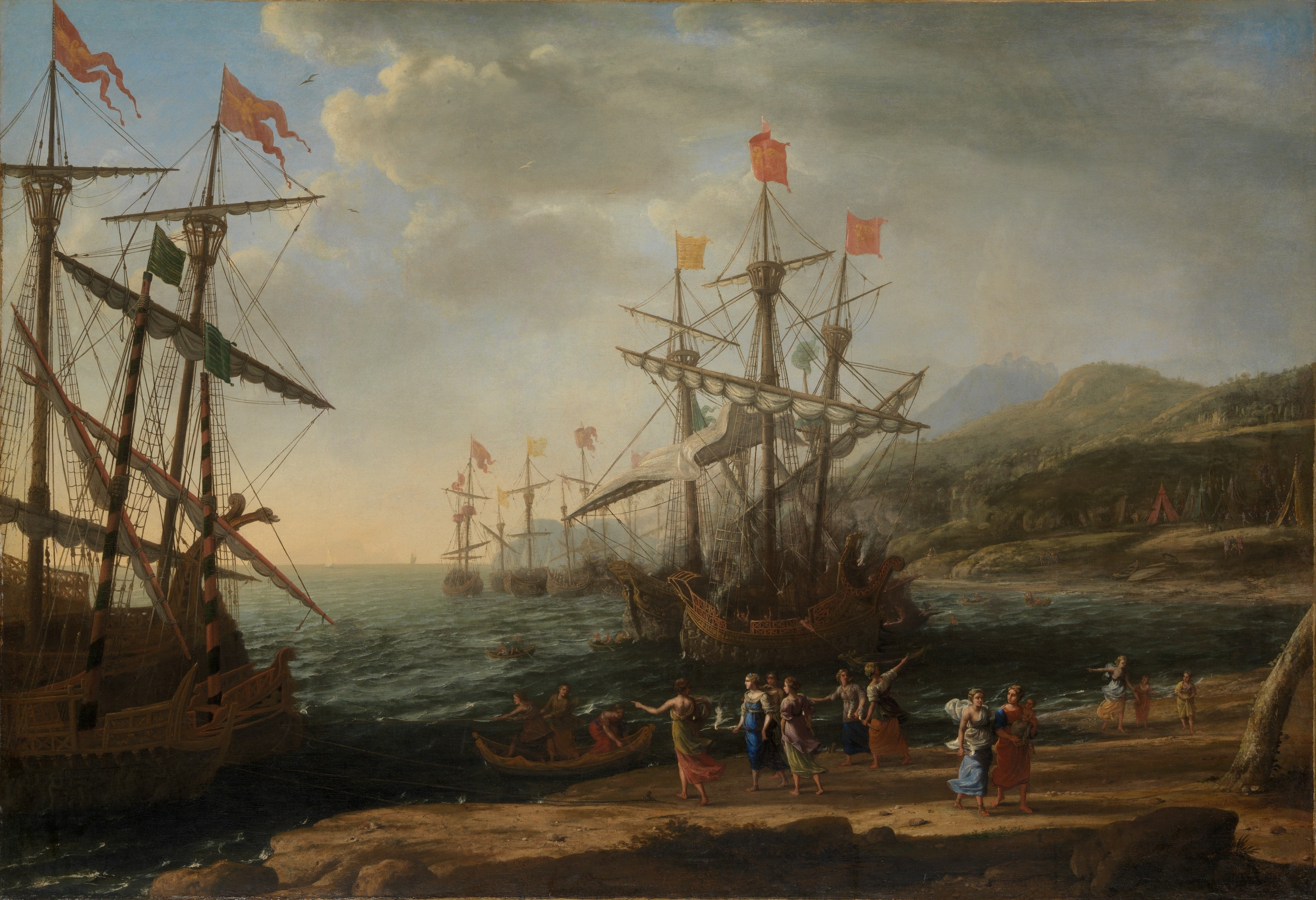
- Artist: Claude Lorrain
- Year: c. 1643
- Medium: Oil on canvas
- Dimensions: 105.1 cm × 152.1 cm (41.4 in × 59.9 in)
- Location: Metropolitan Museum of Art, New York City

The Trojan Women Set Fire to their Fleet is a mid-17th century painting by the French artist Claude Lorrain, in oils on canvas. It is now in the Metropolitan Museum of Art in New York.

== Description ==
Claude Lorrain painted The Trojan Women Set Fire to their Fleet around 1643 at the behest of Cardinal Girolamo Farnese. The scene is Lorrain's take on a famed event in Book 5 of the Aeneid in which the exiled women of Troy, spurred on by the Greek goddess Juno, burn the Trojan fleet to force their men to stop roaming and settle in Sicily. However, Aeneas prays to the god Jupiter to save the ships from the flames by summoning a rainstorm; this is alluded to by Lorrain via his inclusion of dark clouds in the top right of the painting.

Lorrain's choice of scene carries additional subtext, as his patron commissioned the painting after returning to Rome from an extensive period of work abroad, with Trojan Women thus evoking thoughts of an end to wandering. According to the Metropolitan, the painting later inspired the British artist J. M. W. Turner.
