= Landscape with Ascanius Shooting the Stag of Sylvia =

Painting by Claude Lorrain

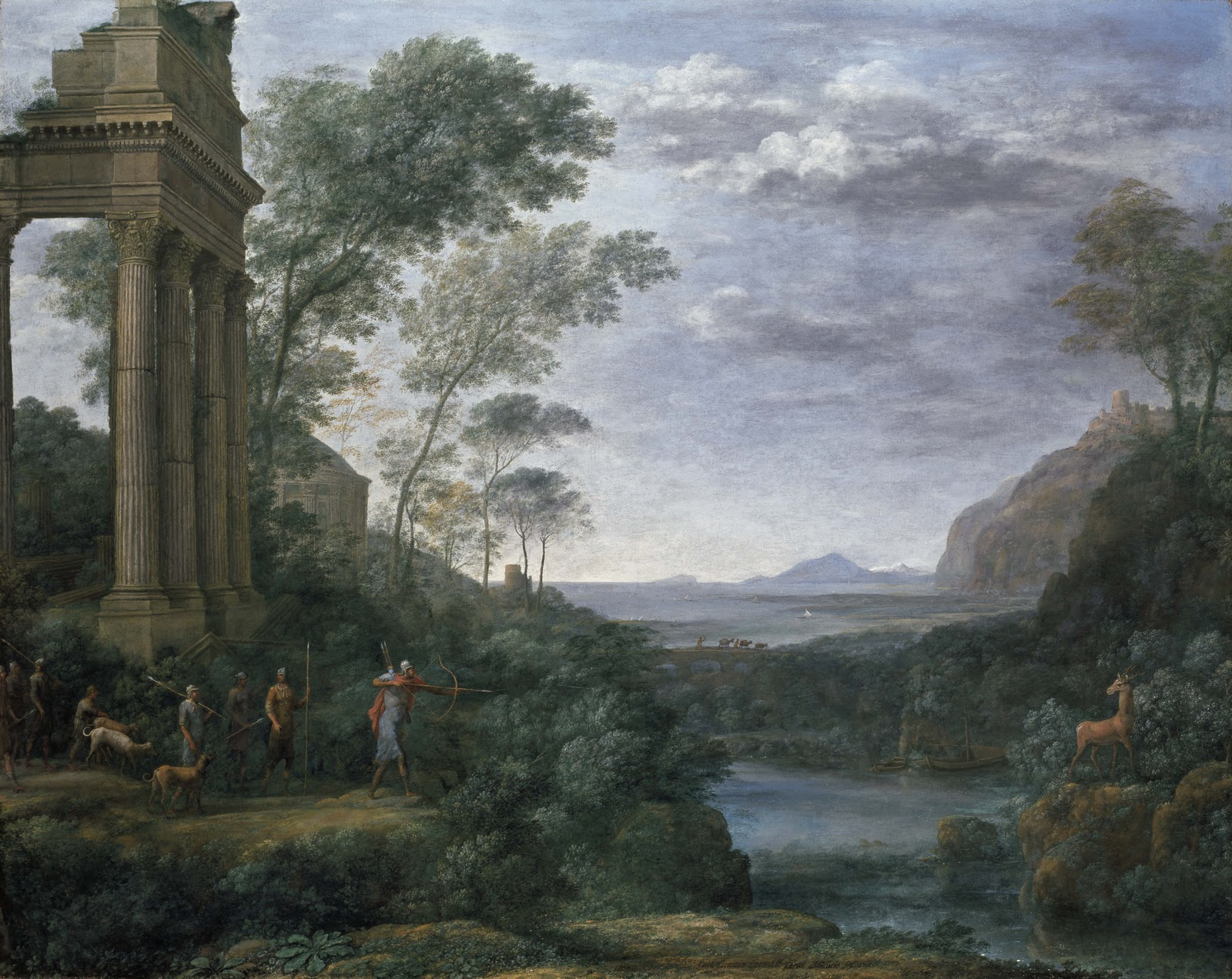
Landscape with Ascanius Shooting the Stag of Sylvia, Ashmolean Museum

Landscape with Ascanius Shooting the Stag of Sylvia is a painting of 1682 in oil on canvas by Claude Lorrain (Claude Gellée, traditionally just "Claude" in English), a painter from the Duchy of Lorraine who spent his career in Rome. It was painted in Rome for Prince Lorenzo Onofrio Colonna (1637–1689), Claude's most important patron in his last years, and is now in the Ashmolean Museum, Oxford. It is signed, dated with the year, and inscribed with the subject (at centre bottom), as Claude sometimes did with his less common subjects.

It was Claude's last painting, and is perhaps not quite finished; it therefore does not appear in the Liber Veritatis, where he made drawings to record his finished works. His date of birth is uncertain, but he was at least in his late seventies when he painted it, perhaps as old as 82. It was a pendant to his painting, completed six years earlier, View of Carthage with Dido and Aeneas (or Aeneas's Farewell to Dido in Carthage, 1676, now Kunsthalle, Hamburg), another scene from the Aeneid, coming earlier than this one. This was the last of Claude's many harbour scenes. With the Oxford painting hung on the left, the groups of figures in each face inwards, and the main buildings frame the outsides of the pair. Both paintings feature large columns on a classical building, a punning reference to the Colonna family, who included such a column in their coat of arms.

The painting depicts a scene from book 7, verses 483–499, of Virgil's epic poem the Aeneid. Aeneas's son Ascanius shoots a stag that is the house-reared pet of Silvia, daughter of "Tyrrheus, chief ranger to the Latian king" (John Dryden's translation), provoking a war with Latium for the future site of Rome. Virgil's account, over 16 lines, spends most of them describing the closeness of the relationship between Sylvia and the stag. The moment shown is one of stillness, as Ascanius takes aim and the stag, too trusting in its special status, looks at him. Once the arrow is fired the tranquil coastal landscape spreading out behind them will very quickly be disrupted by the war that Virgil goes on to describe.

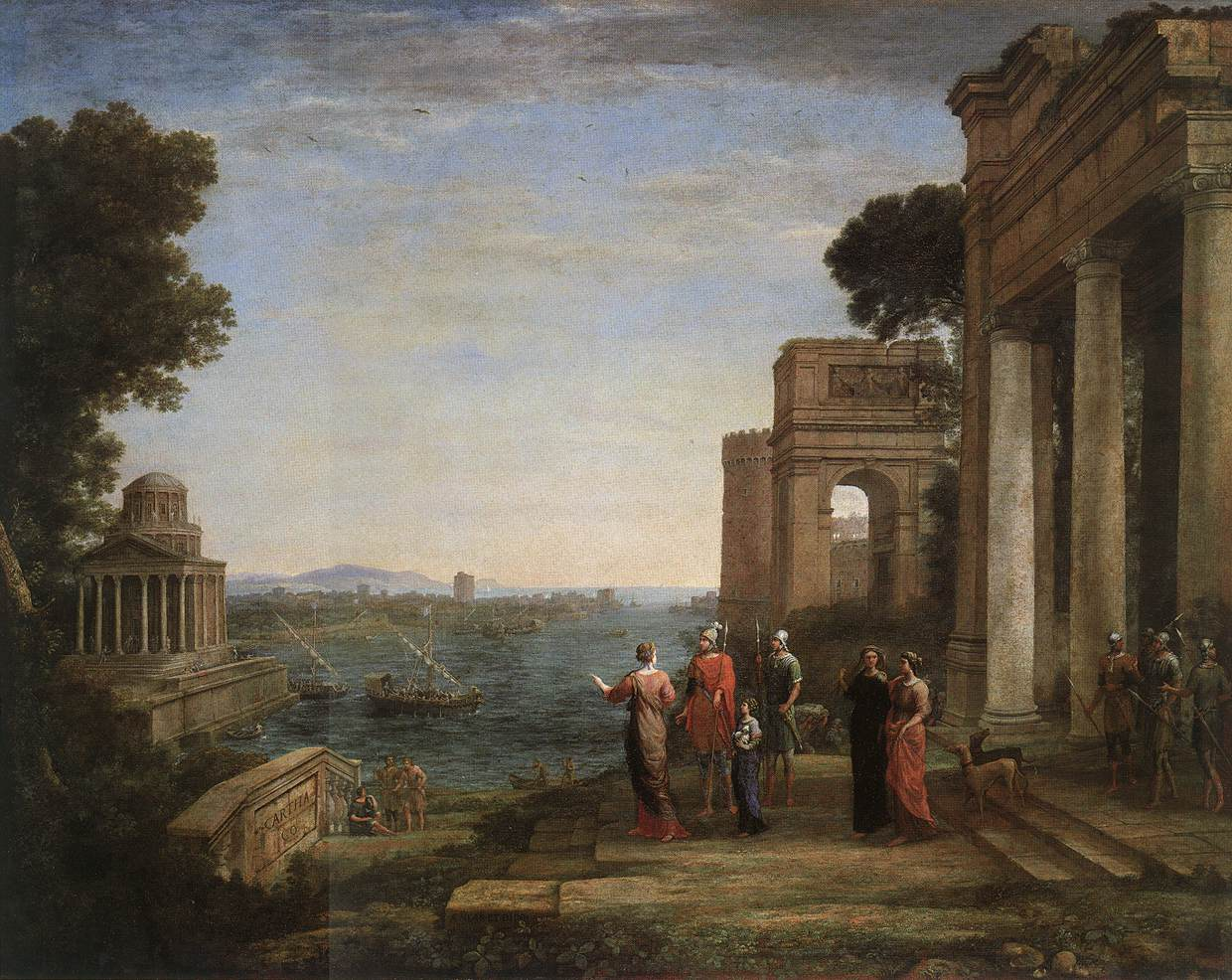
View of Carthage with Dido and Aeneas, 1676, Kunsthalle, Hamburg

Unusually for Claude, the sky is overcast with storm clouds, and the trees are bent by a wind blowing from the left. The elaborate temple in the Corinthian order has long been falling into ruin. On the face of it this, in a scene from before the founding of Rome, is an anachronism that would have been apparent even in the 17th century, but it reflects the state to which ancient Roman monuments were reduced in Claude's own time. The painting therefore embraces the whole trajectory of Roman civilization across history, from its start to its end, and peoples an idealized landscape from Claude's time with figures from its early history.

== Subject and composition ==
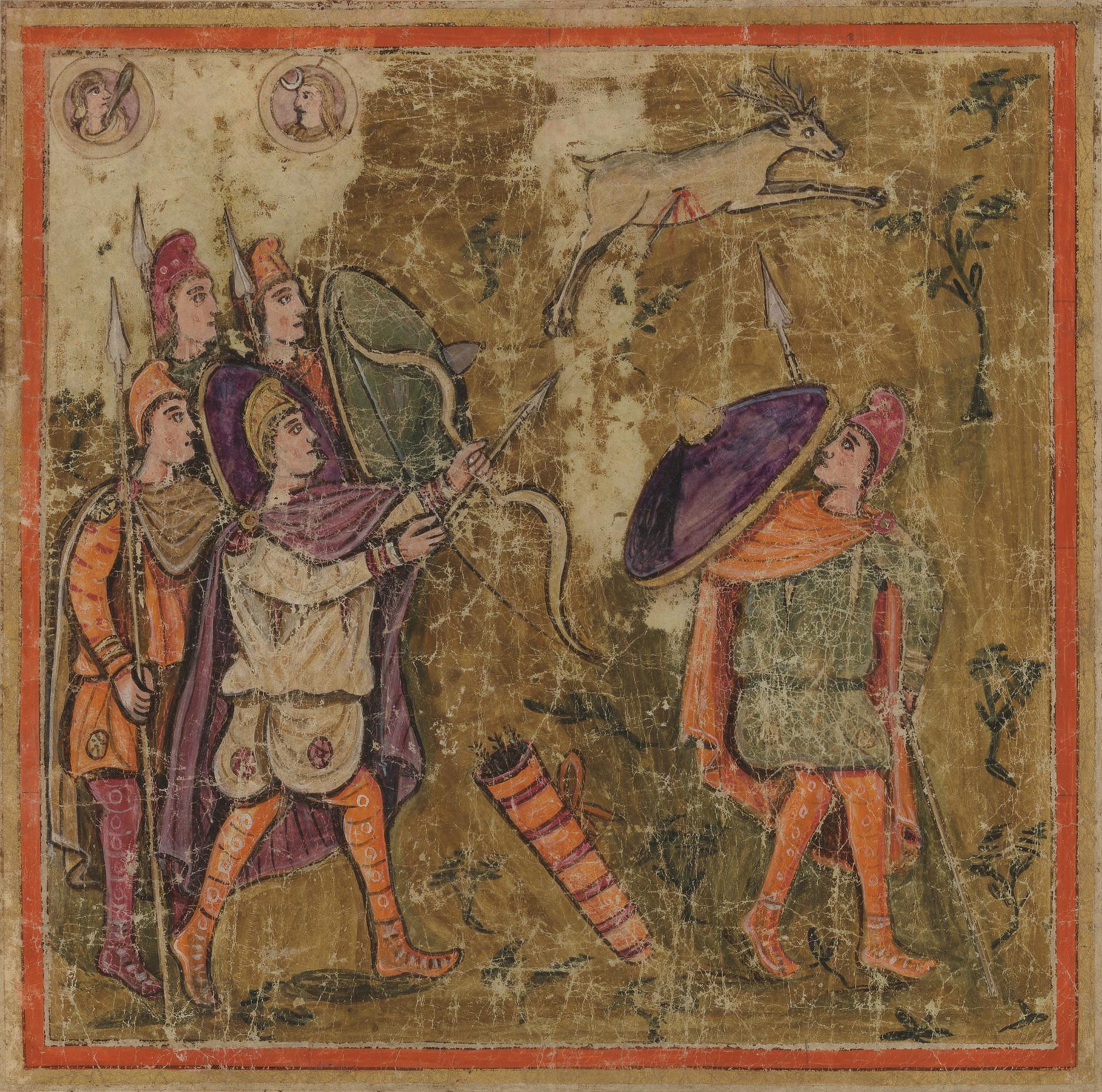
Vergilius Romanus, 5th-century, Vatican Library, Cod. Vat. lat. 3867, f 163 recto

The subject is very rare in art, but there is a composition by Rubens, with a painting in Girona and an oil sketch in the Philadelphia Museum of Art, showing a different point in the story. This is also a late work, but the composition could hardly be more different; here Sylvia nurses the dying stag as a female companion keeps the hounds off it, and fighting has broken out behind them between the Latins and Ascanius' party.

Claude may well have been aware of a depiction in the Vergilius Romanus, a 5th-century illustrated manuscript of the works of Virgil in the Vatican Library (Cod. Vat. lat. 3867, f 163 recto), which was a subject of interest to Roman cognoscenti. Stripped of the landscape the elements in the picture are similar, though Ascanius has already wounded the stag, and is pulling the bow for a second shot. A scene closer to the Rubens, with the wounded stag finding Silvia, is in the Vergilius Vaticanus of about 400; curiously, this is the point where the two Late antique Virgil cycles of illustration come closest to matching.

The composition evolved through a series of drawings, beginning in 1669, with two now at Chatsworth House (1671 or 1678) and the Ashmolean (1682). The final composition, with the river separating the archer and the stag, was only arrived at late in the process. As in the pendant in Hamburg, and many paintings by Claude, the composition draws the viewer's gaze into the background by having two large repoussoir elements at each side, where one is very close at hand, and the other set much further back. The diagonal from left to right thus set up is balanced by the river, which flows in the opposite direction.

== The figures ==
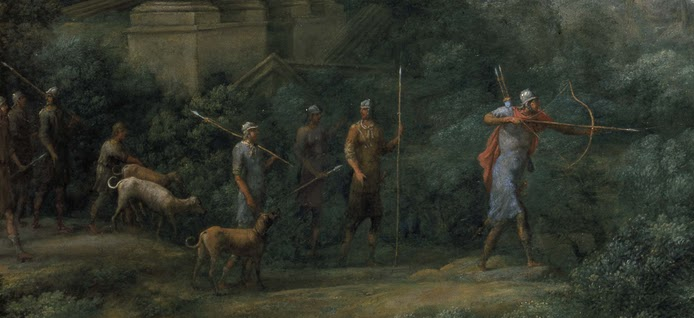
The group of hunters

Although virtually every painting by Claude contains figures, even if only a shepherd, their weakness has always been recognised, not least by Claude himself; according to his biographer Filippo Baldinucci he joked that he charged for his landscapes, but gave the figures for free. According to his other contemporary biographer Joachim von Sandrart he had made considerable efforts to improve them, but without success; certainly there are numerous studies, typically for groups of figures, among his drawings.

In Claude's last years his figures tend to become ever more elongated, a process taken to an extreme in this painting, of which even its owner says "The hunters are impossibly elongated – Ascanius, in particular, is absurdly top-heavy". Its pendant has figures almost as extreme. With the mid-20th century fashion for medical diagnosis through art, it was suggested that Claude had developed an optical condition producing such effects, but this has been rejected by doctors and critics alike.

== Critical appreciation ==
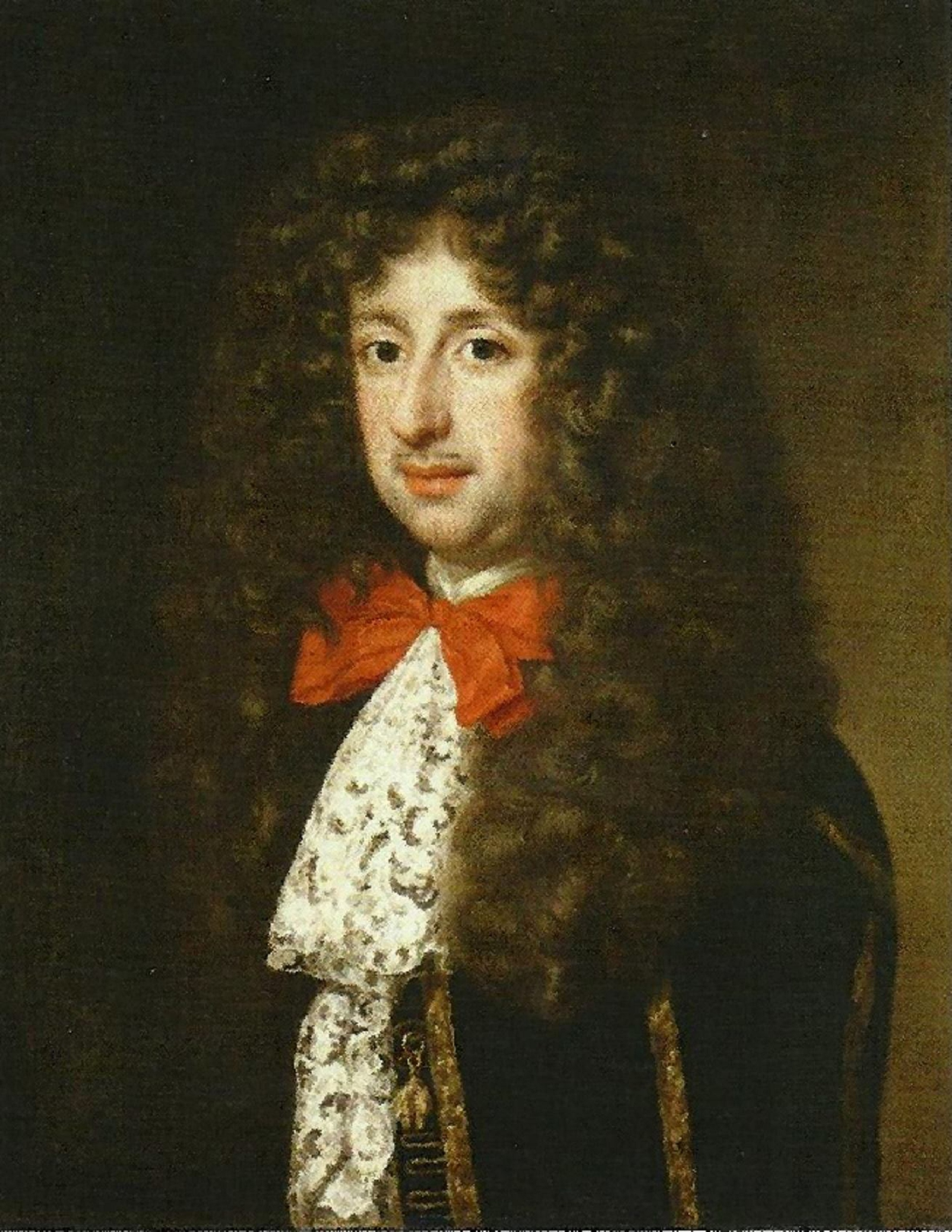
Prince Lorenzo Onofrio Colonna, the patron, by Jacob Ferdinand Voet

Despite the figures, the painting has been one of the most admired of Claude's works. For Anthony Blunt, it "reveals all the qualities of the artist's last phase ... The range of colour is reduced to its utmost limits: silvery green trees, pale grey-blue sky, grey architecture, and neutral-coloured dresses for the figures. The trees are now so diaphanous and the portico is so open that they hardly interrupt the continuity of the air. The figures are thin and elongated, so that they, too, have the immaterial quality suited to this fairyland. All the elements of Claude's poetry are here in their most naked form, but combined in a magical way which defies analysis".

For the Claude specialist Michael Kitson it "at once sums up and goes beyond Claude's previous development. It is utterly personal and yet has that profound, tremulous and remote quality which characterizes the style of other great artists in their old age."

== Provenance and prices ==
Once completed, the painting remained in the Colonna Palace in Rome until 1798/9, when the French occupied Rome, alarming the great families of the nobility. Along with many other top paintings from Roman collections, it was bought by the English collector, dealer, writer, and curator William Young Ottley. Ottley brought it to London, at a time when Claudes were fetching huge prices. It was sold at Christie's on 16 May 1801 for £462, being from now on separated from its pendant, which fetched £840. It was bought by the banker Sir Thomas Baring, 2nd Baronet, and was at his house Stratton Park, Hampshire, by 1837. It remained in the Baring family collection until Francis Baring, 2nd Earl of Northbrook sold it at Christie's in 1919 for £588; by this time prices for Claudes had plunged, allowing for inflation. It was given to the Ashmolean in 1926 by Mrs F. Weldon.
