= Landscape with Psyche Outside the Palace of Cupid =

1664 painting by Claude Lorrain

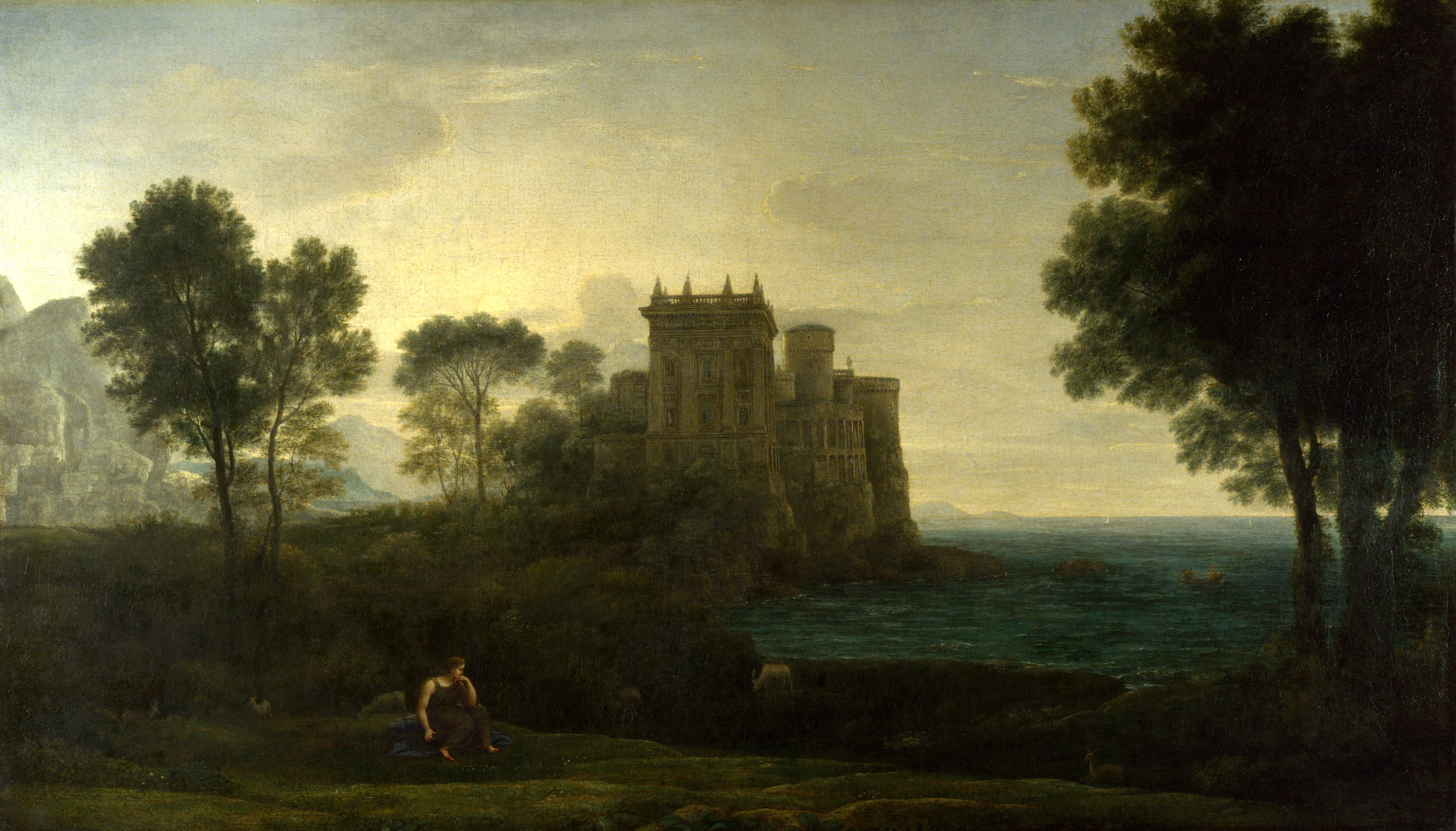
- Artist: Claude Lorrain
- Year: 1664 (Signed and dated: Claude inv. Romae 1639)
- Medium: Oil on canvas
- Dimensions: 88.5 cm × 152.7 cm (34.8 in × 60.1 in)
- Location: National Gallery; London

Landscape with Psyche Outside the Palace of Cupid, or The Enchanted Castle, 1664, is a painting, oil on canvas, by Claude Lorrain in the National Gallery, London. It was commissioned by Lorenzo Onofrio Colonna, a Roman aristocrat. Its subject is taken from The Golden Ass (IV-VI), by Apuleius – the love story of Psyche the soul, and Cupid the god of love. It is not clear if Psyche sits in front of Cupid's castle before she meets him, or after he has abandoned her.

The painting's popular English title, The Enchanted Castle, was first used in an engraving after the picture of 1782.

The picture perhaps shows Psyche's enforced arrival in Cupid's Kingdom, when the Zephyr wafts her to 'deep valley, where she was laid in a soft grassy bed of most sweet and fragrant flowers'. After rest, she sees 'in the middest (sic) and very heart of the woods, well nigh at the fall of the river .... a princely edifice'. Lorrain's representation of Psyche is taken from an engraving by The Master of the Die that shows precisely this episode. Yet the melancholy of the picture suggests Psyche's grief after Cupid's abandonment when according to Apuleius she lamented and keened before throwing herself into the next running water where she drowned.

== John Keats ==
The English Romantic poet John Keats was fascinated by the picture. It is sometimes thought – it is disputed – to have inspired the lines – Charm'd magic casements, opening on the foam/Of perilous seas, in faery lands forlorn, – in one of his most famous poems, "Ode to a Nightingale". There are no such doubts about another poem, called A Reminiscence of Claude's Enchanted Castle, the parts of which most closely describing the painting are:

You know the Enchanted Castle,—it doth stand
Upon a rock, on the border of a Lake,
Nested in trees, which all do seem to shake ...

You know it well enough, where it doth seem
A mossy place, a Merlin's Hall, a dream;
You know the clear Lake, and the little Isles,
The mountains blue, and cold near neighbor rills,
All which elsewhere are but half animate;
There do they look alive to love and hate,
To smiles and frowns; they seem a lifted mound
Above some giant, pulsing underground.

The doors all look as if they oped themselves,
The windows as if latched by Fays and Elves,
And from them comes a silver flash of light,
As from the westward of a Summer's night ...

See! what is coming from the distance dim!
A golden Galley all in silken trim!
Three rows of oars are lightening, moment whiles,
Into the verd'rous bosoms of those isles;
Towards the shade, under the Castle wall,
It comes in silence,—now 'tis hidden all.
