= Claude glass =

Small mirror used to view landscape

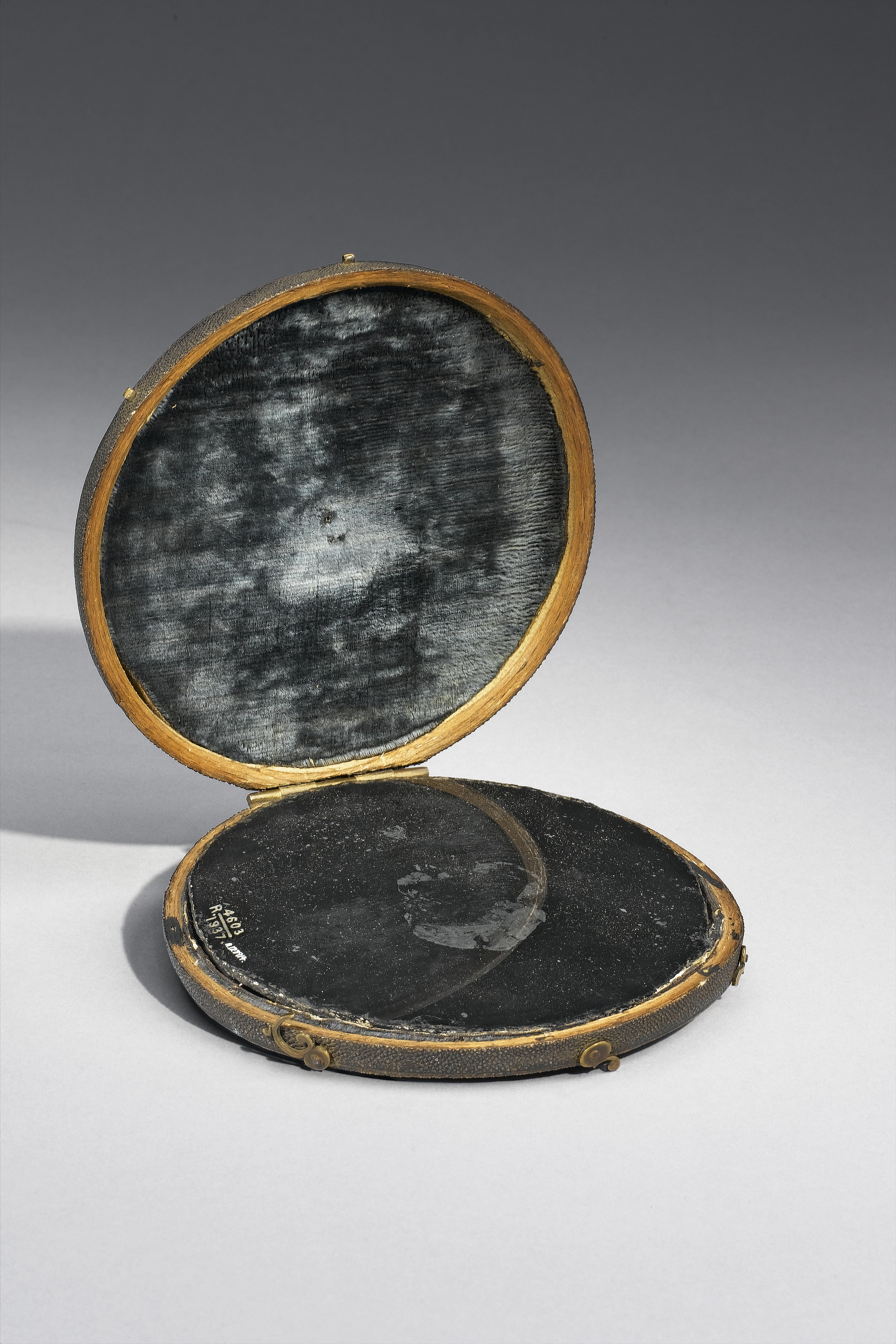
Claude Lorrain mirror in shark skin case.

A Claude glass (or black mirror) is a small mirror, slightly convex in shape, with its surface tinted a dark colour. Bound up like a pocket-book or in a carrying case, Claude glasses were used by artists, travelers and connoisseurs of landscape and landscape painting.

Claude glasses have the effect of reducing and simplifying the colour and tonal range of scenes and scenery to give them a painterly quality. The user would turn their back on the scene to observe the framed view through the tinted mirror — in a sort of pre-photographic lens — which added the picturesque aesthetic of a subtle gradation of tones.

== History ==
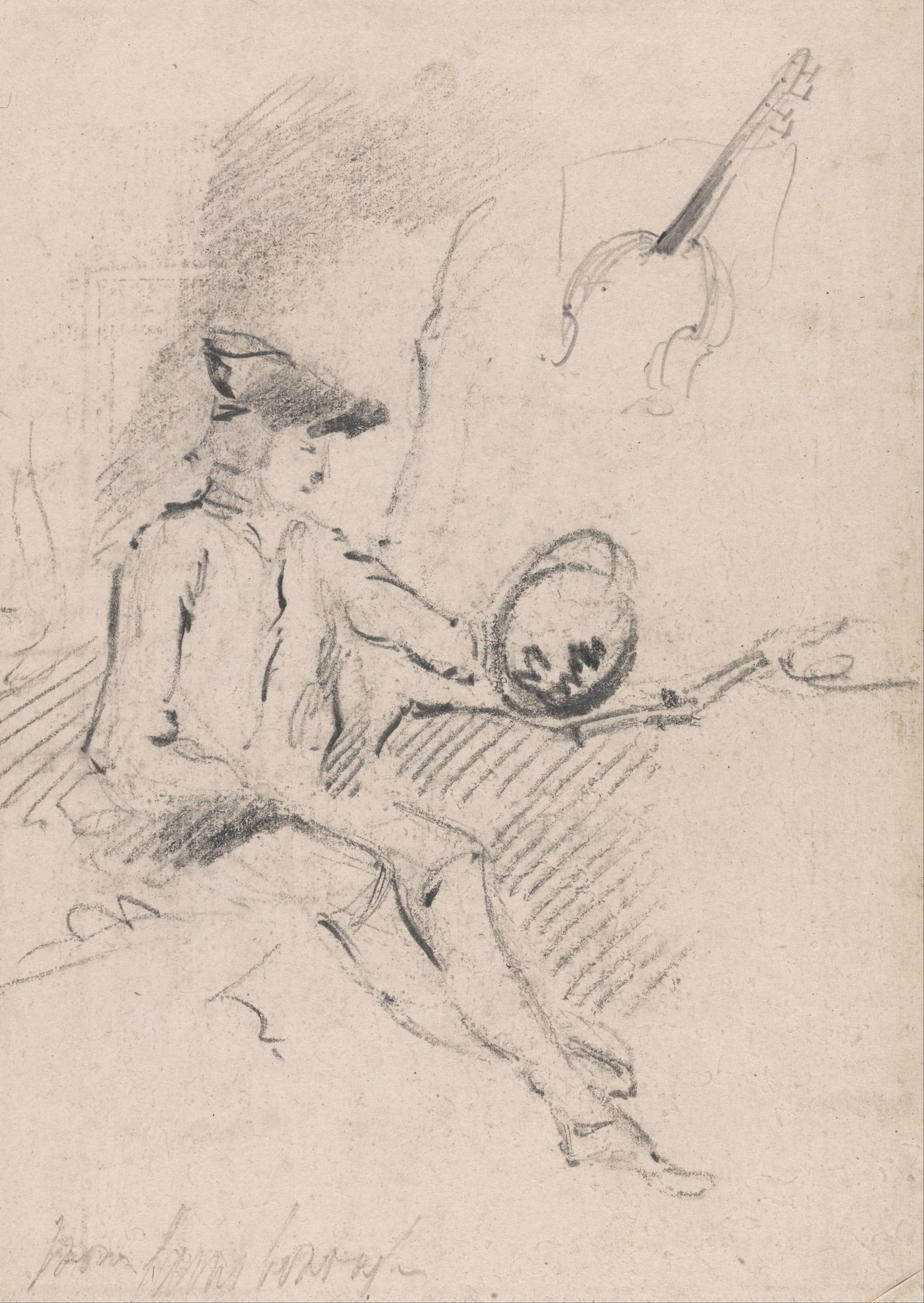
Man Holding a Claude Glass by Thomas Gainsborough

Poet Thomas Gray's Journal of his Tour in the Lake District, published in 1775, popularized the use of the Claude mirror, sometimes referred to as a "Gray glass" around that time. On one sightseeing trip, Gray was so intent on his glass that he fell backward into "a dirty lane" and broke his knuckles; he later remarked how he kept the glass open in his hand, enabling him to see "the sun set in all its glory".

In his influential A Guide to the Lakes (1778), Thomas West explained "The person using it ought always to turn his back to the object that he views. It should be suspended by the upper part of the case ... holding it a little to the right or the left (as the position of the parts to be viewed require) and the face screened from the sun." He recommended carrying two different mirrors: "one to manage reflections of great and near objects and a flatter glass for distant and small objects."

The Claude glass is named for Claude Lorrain, a 17th-century landscape painter, whose name in the late 18th century became synonymous with the picturesque aesthetic, although there is no indication he used or knew of it or anything similar. The Claude glass was supposed to help artists produce works of art similar to those of Lorrain. William Gilpin, the inventor of the picturesque ideal, advocated the use of a Claude glass saying, "they give the object of nature a soft, mellow tinge like the colouring of that Master". Gilpin mounted a mirror in his carriage, from where he could take in "a succession of high-coloured pictures ... continually gliding before the eye".

Claude glasses were widely used by tourists and amateur artists, who quickly became the targets of satire. Hugh Sykes Davies (1909 – 1984) observed their facing away from the object they wished to paint, commenting, "It is very typical of their attitude to Nature that such a position should be desirable."

In the 20th century, architect Mary Colter included Claude glasses (dubbed "reflectoscopes") in her Desert View Watchtower for the use of visitors viewing the Grand Canyon.

== See also ==
- Camera lucida
- Camera obscura
