= The Rape of Europa (Claude Lorrain) =

Painting by Claude Lorrain

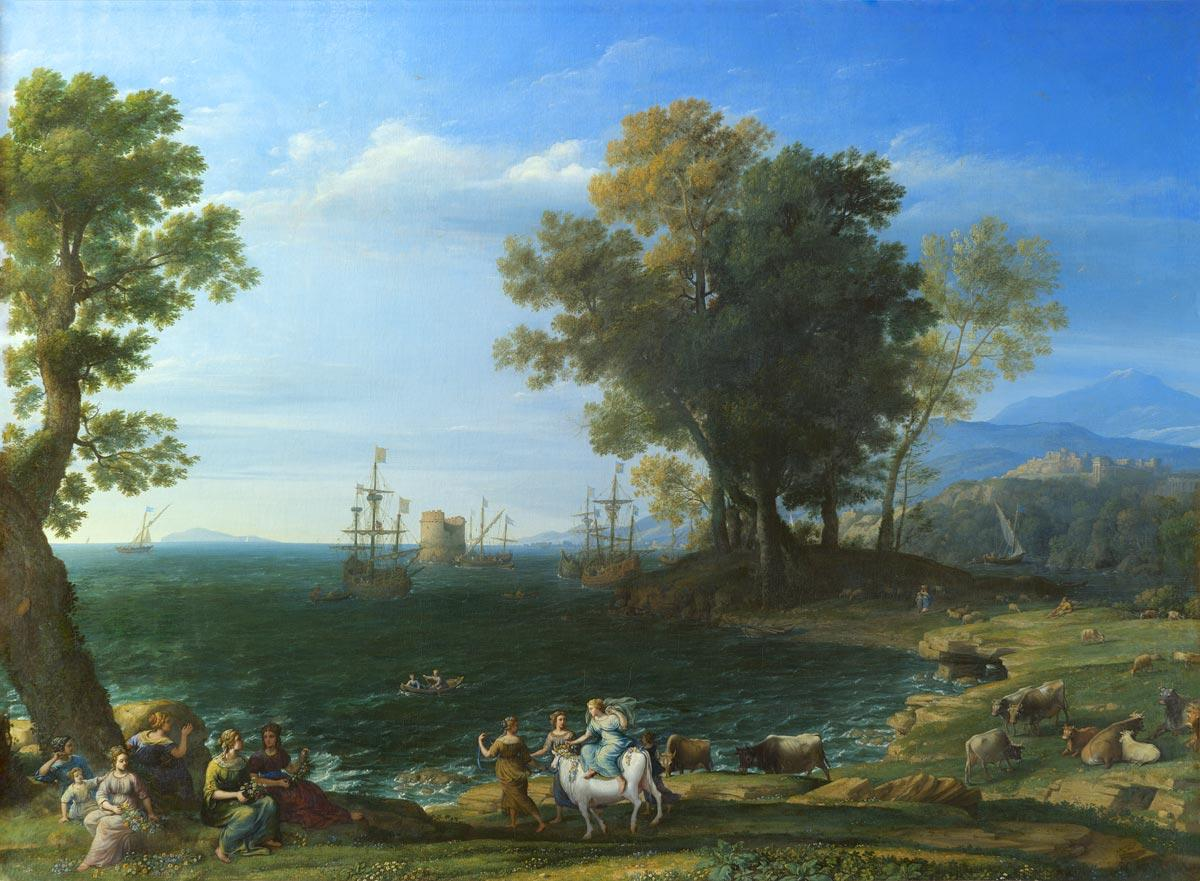
The Rape of Europa (1655) by Claude Lorrain

The Rape of Europa is an oil on canvas painting by Claude Lorrain, from 1655. With its pendant The Battle of the Milvian Bridge, it is now in the Pushkin Museum, in Moscow.

== History ==
The work was painted in Rome, with sketch 136 in his Liber Veritatis equating to it. Below that sketch is the inscription "facto al pio Cardinal […] creato pero giusto pap […]" ("made for the pious cardinal […] elected pope […]") - the word "Cardinal" is very close to the edge of the sheet and it seems likely that the name of the commissioner was cut off when binding the scattered sheets of the diary together. He was Fabio Chigi, elected Pope Alexander VII on 7 April 1655. A preparatory ink and pencil sketch is now in the Kupferstichkabinett Berlin of the Berlin State Museums.

He was paid 225 scudi for Rape and Battle on 6 September of the same year. After that pope's death his heirs retained the work for a long while. It was bought in Rome by Prince Nikolay Yusupov in 1798, sending it first to his home in Moscow, then to the Arkhangelskoye Palace and finally to his Moika Palace in Saint Petersburg. All the Yusupov princes' collections were seized by the Soviet state after the October Revolution and the palace was converted into a museum until 1924, when the work was transferred to the Hermitage Museum. It was then moved to its present home in 1927.
