= Charles Whitman (disambiguation) =

Charles Whitman (1941–1966) was an American mass killer, referenced as the Texas Tower Sniper.

Charles Whitman may also refer to:

- Charles Otis Whitman (1842–1910), American scholar in zoology
- Charles Seymour Whitman (1868–1947), American politician; Governor of New York (1915–19)
- Charles Huntington Whitman (1873–1937), American academic; scholar in English literature

== See also ==
- Charles Whitman Cross (1854–1949), American scholar in geology
- Alfred Charles Whitman (1860–1910), English scholar in engravings
