= Elizabeth Reynolds =

Elizabeth Reynolds may refer to:

- Elizabeth Walker (artist) (1800–1876), née Reynolds
- Elizabeth Reynolds, a leader of the 1887 Bloody Sunday protest
- Liz Reynolds, a character in One Life to Live
- Elizabeth Reynolds, a character in Snapped
- Elizabeth Reynolds, a character in The Road West
- Elizabeth Reynolds, also known as Elizabeth Devereux-Rochester, an agent of the Special Operations Executive in World War II
