= John Lucas (painter) =

English portrait painter (1807–1874)

John Lindsay Lucas (4 July 1807 – 30 April 1874) was an English portrait painter.

== Life ==
Born in London on 4 July 1807, he was son of William Lucas, from a King's Lynn family, originally in the Royal Navy, then a writer and journalist; his mother was a Miss Callcott. He was apprenticed to Samuel William Reynolds, the mezzo-tint engraver, where Samuel Cousins was his fellow-pupil. At the end of his apprenticeship he set up as a portrait-painter.

Lucas was a member of the Clipstone Street academy, where he worked with William Etty and other artists. One of his earliest patrons and sitters was Henry Milton, who introduced him to Mary Russell Mitford, whose portrait he painted, and exhibited at the Royal Academy in 1829. He then substituted a portrait of her father. A further portrait of her, he kept in his studio, and it was purchased after his death for the National Portrait Gallery.

One of the fashionable portrait-painters of his time, Lucas had a successful career. He died at his residence in St John's Wood, London, on 30 April 1874. Works in his possession at his death went to auction by Messrs. Christie, Manson & Wood's, on 25 February 1875.

== Works ==
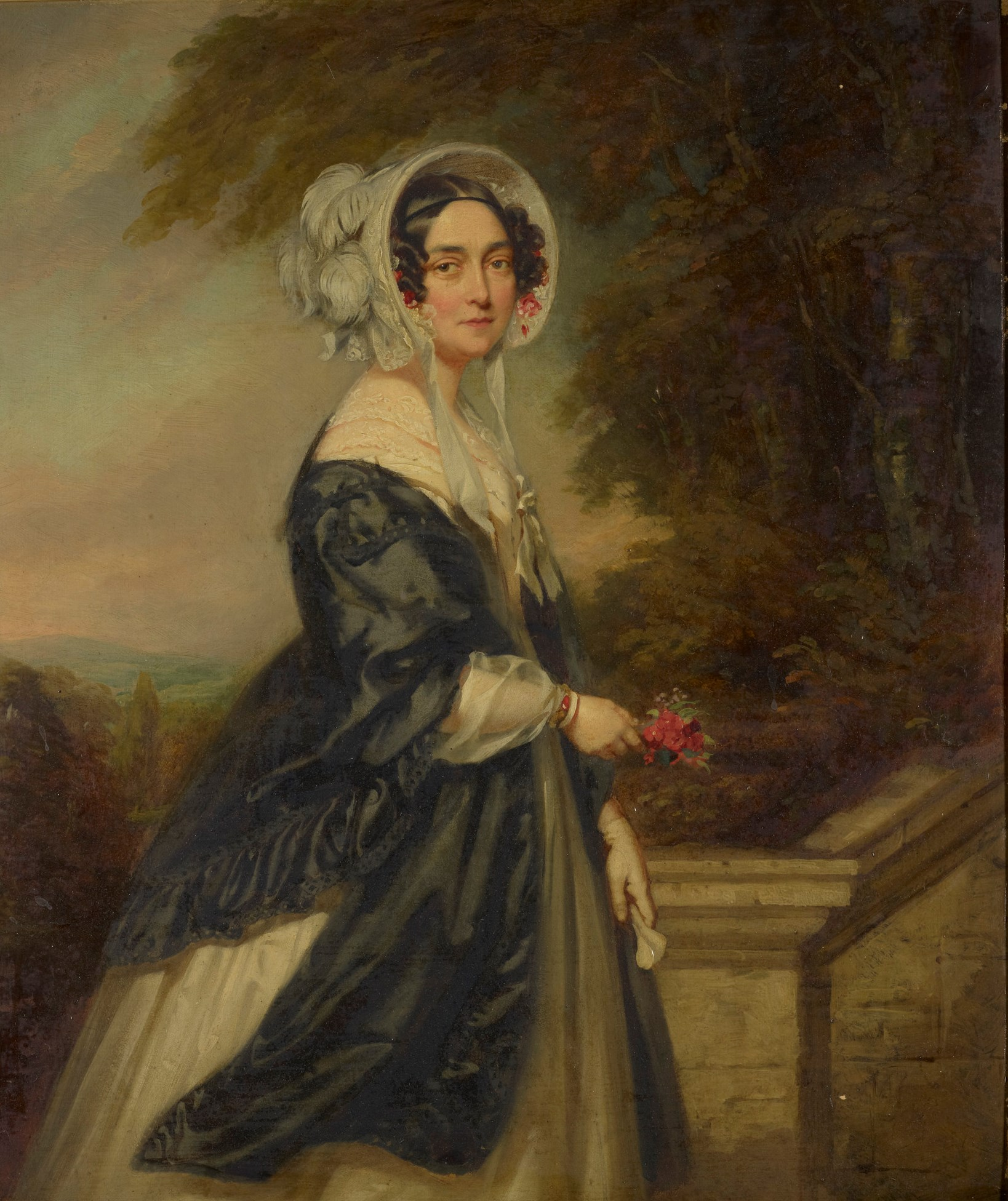
Victoria of Saxe-Coburg-Saalfeld, Duchess of Kent, 1841 portrait by John Lucas

Lucas exhibited 96 portraits at the Royal Academy, 13 at the British Institution, and eight at the Suffolk Street Gallery, between 1828 and his death. Those sat who sat for him included Queen delaide, Albert, Prince Consort (four times), the Louise, Princess Royal, Arthur Wellesley, 1st Duke of Wellington (eight times), Henry John Temple, 3rd Viscount Palmerston and Emily Temple, Viscountess Palmerston, William Ewart Gladstone, Philip Stanhope, 5th Earl Stanhope and his wife, and many court beauties. He contributed to Sir Robert Peel's gallery of contemporary portraits.

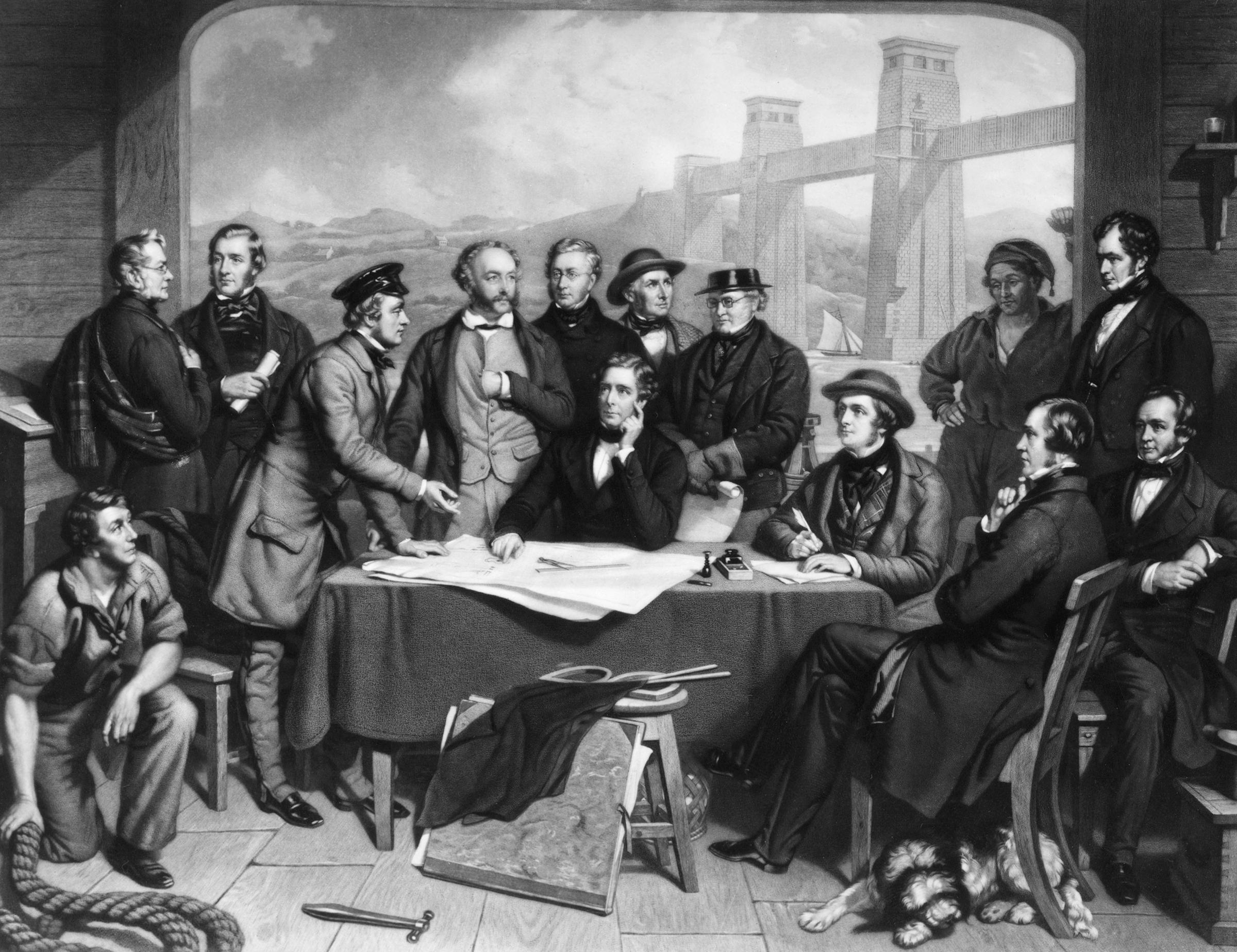
Conference of Engineers at the Menai Straits Preparatory to Floating one of the Tubes of the Britannia Bridge, 1868 engraving by James Scott, after John Lucas, portrait group of Robert Stephenson, Isambard Kingdom Brunel, and other engineers, consulting over the Menai Bridge

Many of Lucas's portraits were engraved, some, like that of Nicholas Conyngham Tindal, by himself in mezzotint. He also engraved a few portraits after Sir Thomas Lawrence, including one of Maria II of Portugal.

== Family ==
Lucas married early in life Miss Milborough Morgan, and left three sons and two daughters. The eldest son, John Templeton Lucas (1836–1880), was an artist; William Lucas became a water colourist; and Arthur Lucas became an art publisher in New Bond Street, London. John Seymour Lucas was a nephew and pupil.
