= Thomas Goff Lupton =

English mezzotint engraver and artist

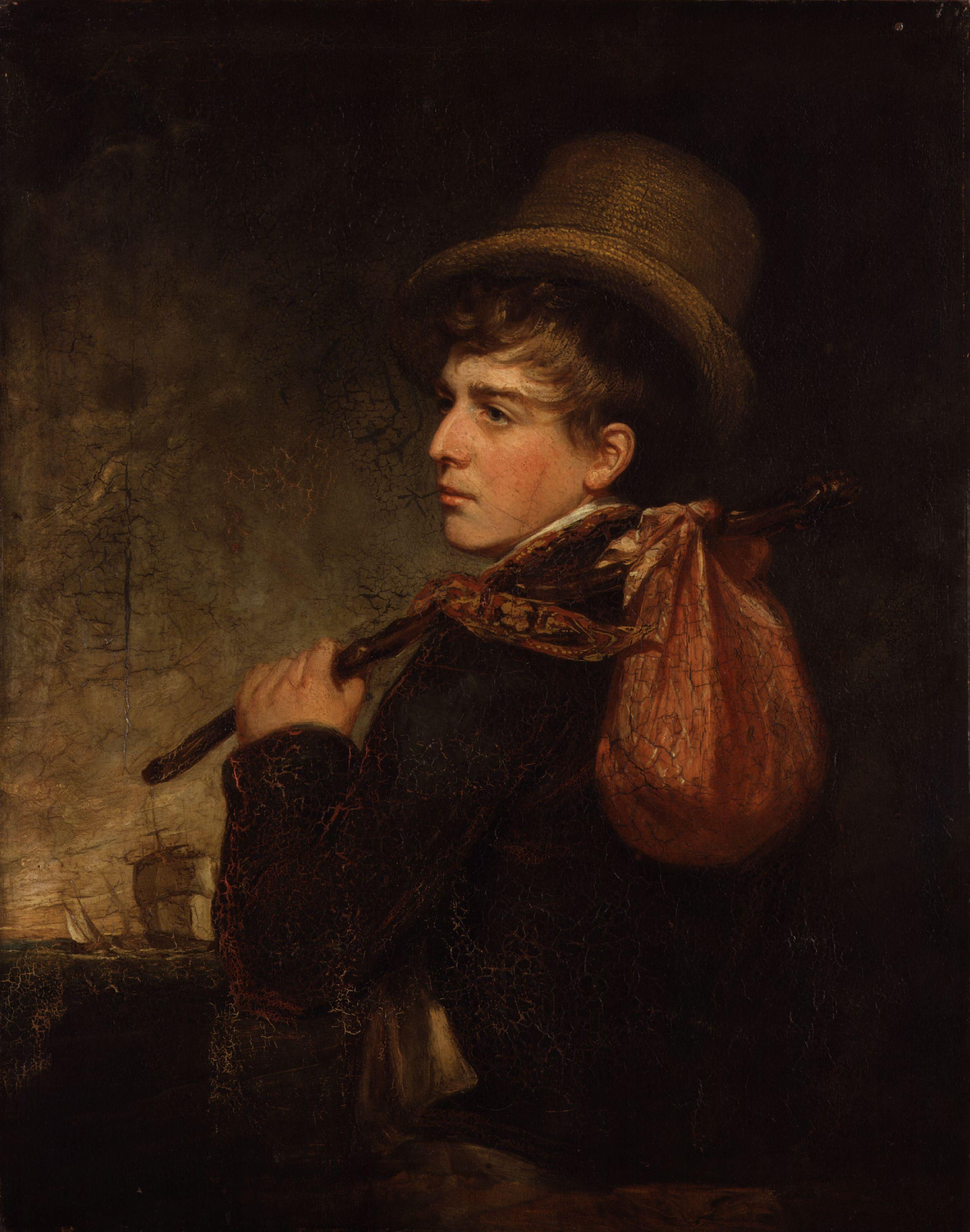
- George Clint, Thomas Goff Lupton, oil on canvas, National Portrait Gallery, London
- Born: 3 September 1791; Clerkenwell, London, England
- Died: 18 May 1873 (aged 81); Russell Square, London, England
- Known for: Engravings, development of steel engraving plates

Thomas Goff Lupton (3 September 1791 – 18 May 1873) was an English mezzotint engraver and artist, who engraved many works by J. M. W. Turner and other notable British painters of the 19th century. He also produced some pastels, exhibited at the Royal Academy. He played an important part in advancing the technical aspect of engraving by introducing soft steel plates.

== Life and work ==
=== Early life and training ===
Lupton was born in Clerkenwell, London, the son of William and Mary Lupton. His father, a working goldsmith, apprenticed him to George Clint by whom he was instructed in mezzotint engraving. Later he became assistant to Samuel William Reynolds, and, when Samuel Cousins was articled to the latter in 1814, Lupton gave him his first lesson. Between 1811 and 1820 he exhibited a few pastel portraits at the Royal Academy. Lupton was the youngest of the engravers employed by J. M. W. Turner upon the "Liber Studiorum" ("Book of Studies"), and he executed four of the best of the published and several of the unpublished plates.

=== Steel plates ===
Lupton was mainly responsible for the introduction of steel for mezzotint engraving. Hoping to find a more durable substitute for copper, he made experiments on nickel plates, the Chinese alloy called tutenag (an alloy of copper, zinc, and nickel), and steel, and, deciding upon the latter, used it for a successful portrait of Munden the actor, after Clint. In 1822 he received the Isis Medal of the Society of Arts for his application of soft steel for engraving - from one plate alone he was still able to get good copy even after 1,500 impressions; all his subsequent works were therefore produced on steel.

=== Works ===
In 1825 six plates by Lupton, after Turner, were published with the title Views of the Ports of England. These were reissued in 1856 with six more by Lupton, as The Harbours of England, with text by John Ruskin; be also engraved many of the plates for Gems of Art (1823), Beauties of Claude (1825), Turner and Girtin's River Scenery of England (1827, and Lady Charlotte Bury's The Three Great Sanctuaries of Tuscany (1833). His most notable single plates included The Infant Samuel, after Reynolds; Belshazzar's Feast, after John Martin; Wellington surveying the Field of Waterloo, after Benjamin Haydon; The Eddystons Lighthouse and Fishing at Margate, after Turner; some portraits of theatrical groups after Clint, and portraits after Sir Thomas Lawrence, Henry Perronet Briggs, Thomas Phillips, John Watson Gordon, and others.

Lupton also started engraving, a large plate from Turners Calais Pier under the artist's direction, but due to the frequent alterations made by the painter it was never completed. Between 1868 and 1864, he re-engraved fifteen of the Liber Studiorum subjects for a series intended to be issued in parts, but the project failed and the plates remained unpublished.

He was an active supporter of the Artists' Annuity Fund, of which he was elected president in 1836.

== Pupils ==
William Oakley Burgess was his pupil.

== Death ==
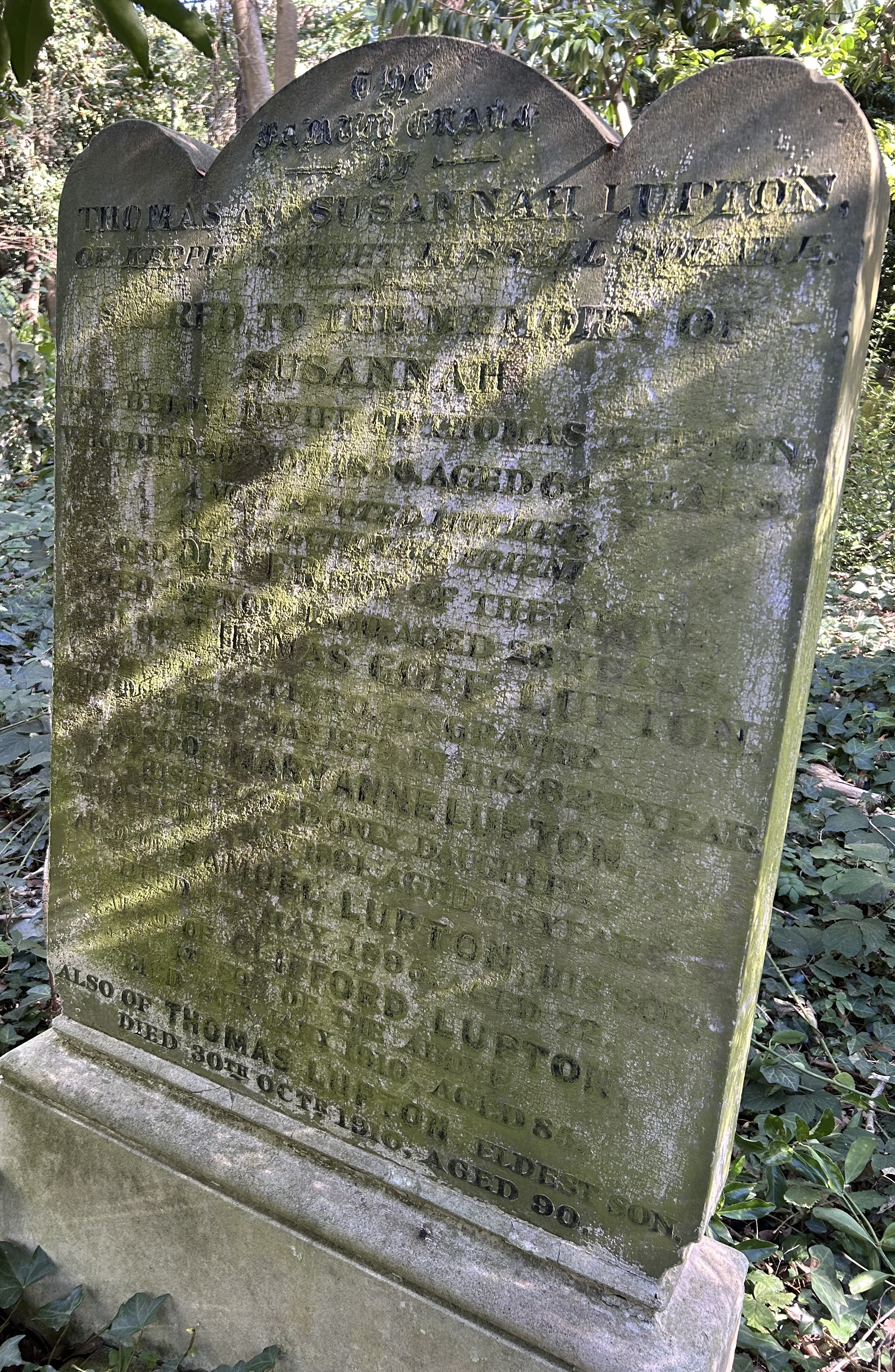
Grave of Thomas Goff Lupton in Highgate Cemetery

Lupton died on 18 May 1873 at 4 Keppel Street, Russell Square, London, where he had lived for 36 years. He was buried on the western side of Highgate Cemetery.

== Family ==
By his marriage in 1818 to Susanna Oliver he had a family of six sons and one daughter. His youngest son, Nevil Oliver Lupton, born in 1828, won the "Turner" gold medal of the Royal Academy at the first competition in 1867, and was a frequent exhibitor of landscapes until 1877.
