= Samuel William Reynolds =

English engraver, painter and gardener

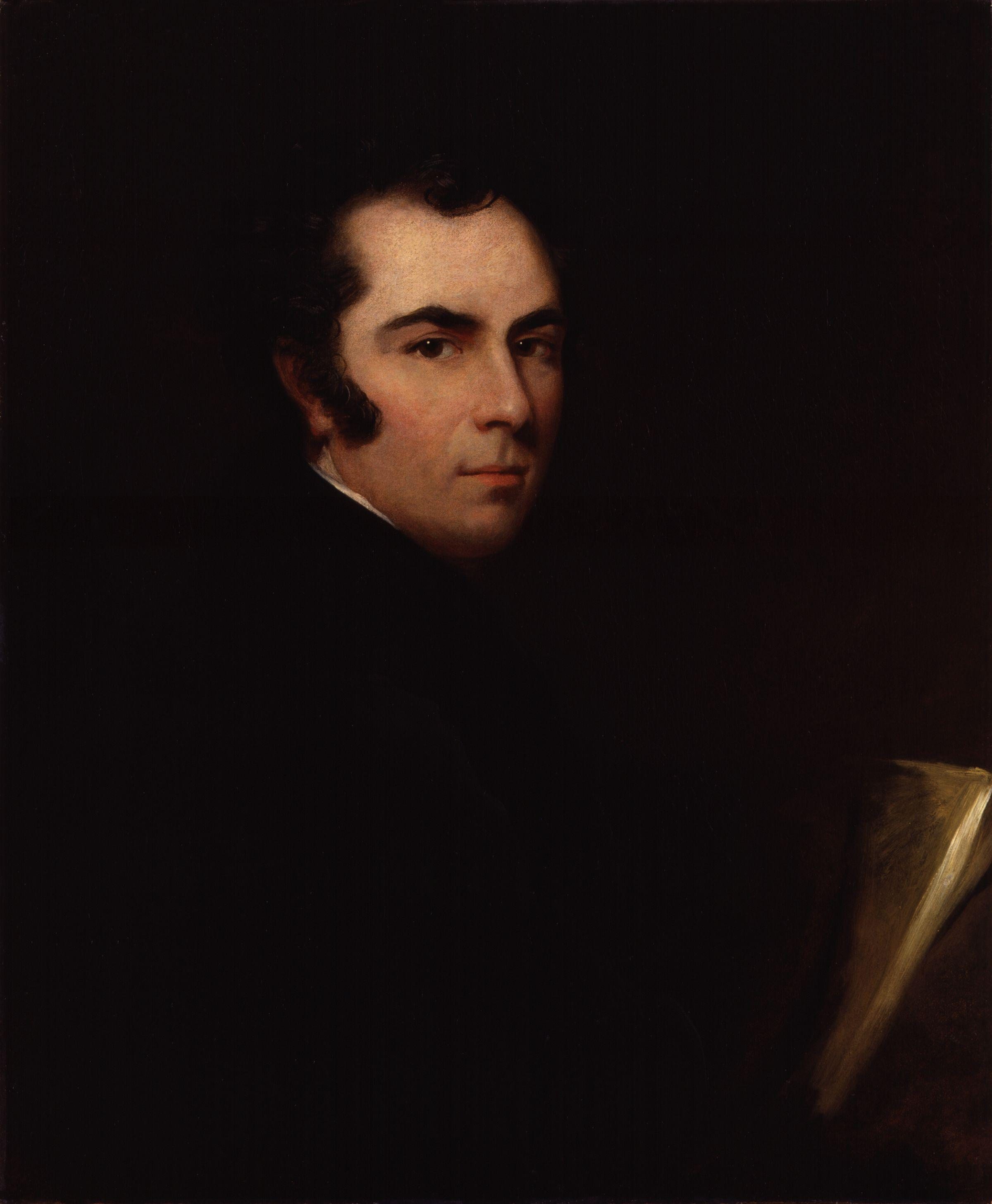
- Samuel William Reynolds self-portrait
- Born: 4 July 1773
- Died: 13 August 1835 (aged 62); Ivy Cottage, Bayswater, London

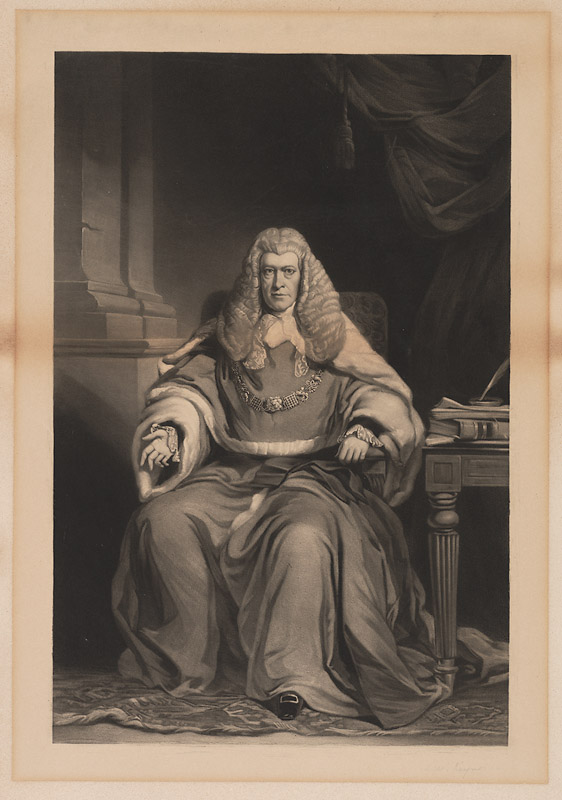
Sir Frederick Pollock, 1st Baronet (1783-1870)

Samuel William Reynolds (4 July 1773 – 13 August 1835) was an English engraver, painter and gardener who specialised in landscape painting and landscape architecture. Reynolds was a popular engraver in both Britain and France and there are over 400 examples of his work in the National Portrait Gallery, London.

== Biography ==
Reynolds was born on 4 July 1773. His father was born in the West Indies, the son of a planter, but, being sent in his youth to England for education, settled there permanently, and married Reynolds' mother, Sarah Hunt.

Reynolds studied in the schools of the Royal Academy, and under the mezzotint engravers Charles Howard Hodges and John Raphael Smith. His earliest dated mezzotint is a portrait of George, Prince of Wales, from May 1794.

In 1797 he engraved a plate of The Relief of Prince Adolphus and Marshal Freytag after Mather Brown, which shows a complete mastery of the art, and during the next twenty years produced many fine works, including The Vulture and Lamb, The Falconer, Leopards, Vulture and Snake, and Heron and Spaniel, all after James Northcote; A Land Storm, after George Morland; portraits of Sir Joshua Reynolds, Sir J. F. Leicester, and Lady Harcourt, after Joshua Reynolds; portraits of Lady Elizabeth Whitbread and the Duchess of Bedford, after John Hoppner; The Jew Merchant, after Rembrandt; and The Rainbow, after Rubens.

He also engraved a large number of portraits and compositions by Dance, Jackson, William Owen (1769–1825), Stephanoff, Bonington, Gregor MacGregor, Sir Robert Ker Porter, and others, and was one of the artists employed by J. M. W. Turner on his Liber Studiorum. Reynolds worked with great rapidity, often combining etching, aquatint and stipple engraving techniques with the mezzotint.

Early in life Reynolds secured for himself and his family the friendship and patronage of Samuel Whitbread, and, through his connection with Drury Lane Theatre, became intimate with Thomas Sheridan and Edmund Kean. He frequently visited the theatre to assist the latter in making up his face for the part of Othello.

He was employed as drawing-master to the royal princesses, and through them was offered more than one post at court, which he declined, but he accepted the appointment of engraver to the king, although he refused a knighthood. He drew and engraved a remarkable portrait of King George III (with a beard) in extreme old age, which he published in 1820. Throughout his career he practised oil and watercolour painting, and exhibited landscapes and other subjects at the Royal Academy and the British Institution from 1797. His landscapes, which are very original and powerful in treatment, mostly went to France and Germany at the time, which accounted for his not being so well known as a painter in Great Britain.

In 1809, Reynolds paid his first visit to Paris, and in 1810 and 1812 exhibited engravings at the Paris Salon. Between 1820 and 1826 he issued, a series of 357 small plates in four volumes, reproducing all the then accessible works of Sir Joshua Reynolds, with whom he claimed relationship. Upon the completion of this he revisited Paris, where his work, both in painting and engraving, created much enthusiasm among French artists, several of whom became his pupils. An article, which appeared at the time in L'Artiste, describing Reynolds's extraordinary talents, is quoted by Beraldi in Les Graveurs du XIXe Siècle ("Engravers of the 18th century").

Reynolds executed a considerable number of plates in France, including The Raft of the Medusa, after Géricault; La Bonne Fille, after Haudebourt-Lescot; The Massacre of the Innocents, after Léon Cogniet; Mazeppa, after Horace Vernet; a few fancy subjects after Dubufe; and some studies after Charlet. Several of these were exhibited at the Salon in 1827.

Reynolds began a large plate from John Constable's picture The Lock, but did not live to complete it; a letter from him, in praise of the original, is printed in Leslie's Life of Constable. Reynolds had many pupils, the ablest of whom were Samuel Cousins, David Lucas, and John Lucas (1807–1874). He was also a skilful landscape-gardener, and laid out the grounds of Southall and Mount Edgcumbe.

He died of paralysis at Ivy Cottage, Bayswater, London, where he had lived for many years, on 13 August 1835. His collections, which consisted chiefly of his own drawings and engravings, were sold at Christie's in the following April. By his wife, Jane Cowen, to whom he was married in 1793, and who survived him some years, enjoying an annuity from the Whitbread family. Reynolds had two sons and three daughters.

His elder son of the same name, Samuel William Reynolds Jr. (1794–1872), was also a noted mezzotint engraver and landscape painter. Of his daughters, Elizabeth, an able miniaturist, married engraver William Walker (1791–1877), and Frances exhibited miniatures at the Royal Academy (1828–1830).

A small portrait of Reynolds, etched by Edward Bell, was published by A. E. Evans in 1855. Another portrait was painted by his friend Ary Scheffer. In a humorous watercolour drawing by A. E. Chalon, representing artists at work in the gallery of the British Institution in 1805, Reynolds, seated at his easel, is a prominent figure. A portrait of his wife was painted by John Opie.

== Sources ==
- Whitman, Alfred Charles (1903). Samuel William Reynolds. Nineteenth Century Mezzotinters. London: George Bell and Sons.
