= Elizabeth Walker (artist) =

Painter and engraver from Britain

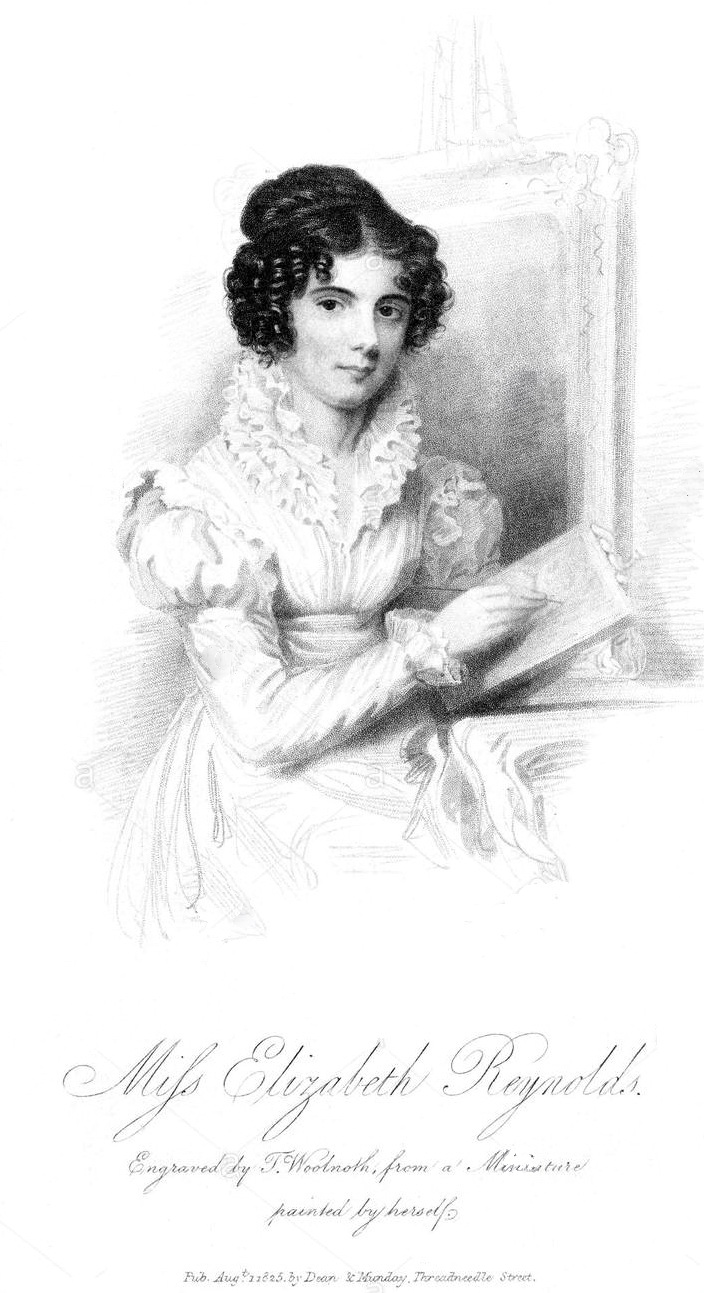
Elizabeth Reynolds (1825)

Elizabeth Walker (1800–1876) was a British engraver and portrait-painter.

== Life ==
She was born Elizabeth Reynolds in Westminster on 14 July 1800. She was the second child, of six, born to pattern maker Jane Reynolds (born Cowing) and engraver Samuel William Reynolds. The family had debts which they were rescued from by Samuel Whitbread who was a Whig politician. He paid the debts and employed her father as Southill Park's landscape gardener and his artistic adviser. The family moved back to Soho in London in 1814.

In 1829, she married Scottish engraver William Walker (1791–1867). She studied engraving under Thomas Goff Lupton, but after a while, decided to devote herself to miniatures (studying under George Clint) rather than engraving. She exhibited at the Royal Academy 1818–50, was appointed miniature painter to William IV in 1830, and executed portraits of five prime ministers. Walker died in London on 9 November 1876.

== Gallery ==
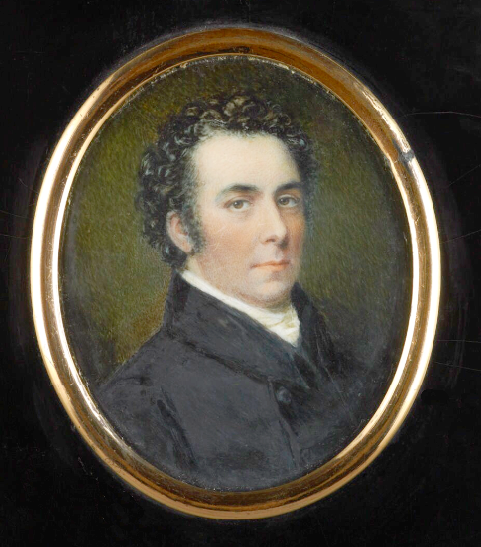
Samuel William Reynolds (1773-1835) by his daughter Elizabeth Reynolds

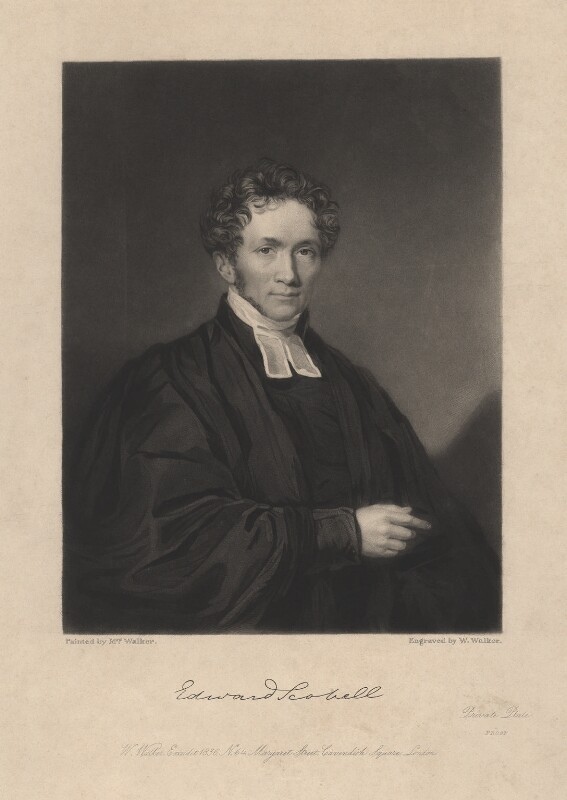
Edward Scobell (1785-1860), vicar and writer - engraved by William Walker (1791-1867), after his wife Elizabeth Walker

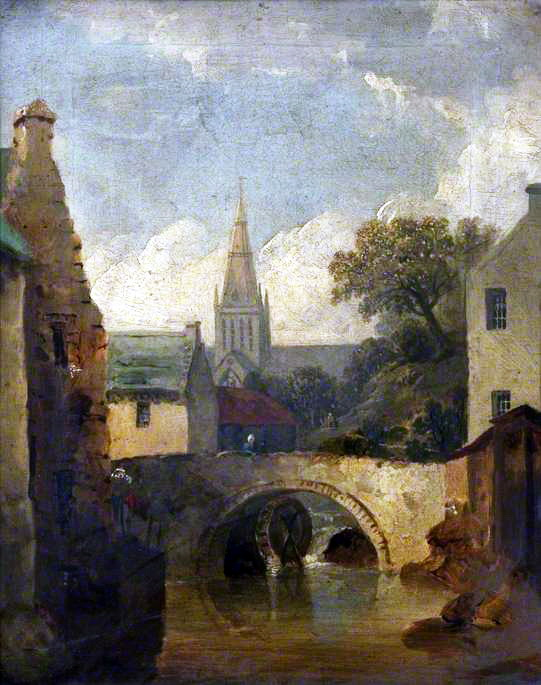
Molendinar Burn, Glasgow, Scotland
