= Ludovico Caracciolo =

Ludovico Caracciolo (1761 in Rome – 1842) was an Italian landscapist and engraver. He became a protege of Elizabeth Foster, the second wife of William Cavendish, 5th Duke of Devonshire, who moved to Rome after she was widowed in 1811.

He published a full set of print reproductions after Claude Lorrain's Liber Veritatis in Rome in 1815. His specialism was architectural drawings and panoramas of Rome, including an 1824 oil on canvas that is now in the collection of the Victoria and Albert Museum – he also adapted that work as a six-print aquatint in 1831.
