= William Oakley Burgess =

English mezzotint engraver

William O. Burgess
- Born: 22 April 1816; Bexley, Kent, England
- Died: 24 December 1844 (aged 28)
- Education: Thomas Goff Lupton
- Known for: mezzotint portrait

William Oakley Burgess (22 April 1816 – 24 December 1844) was an English mezzotint engraver.

== Life ==
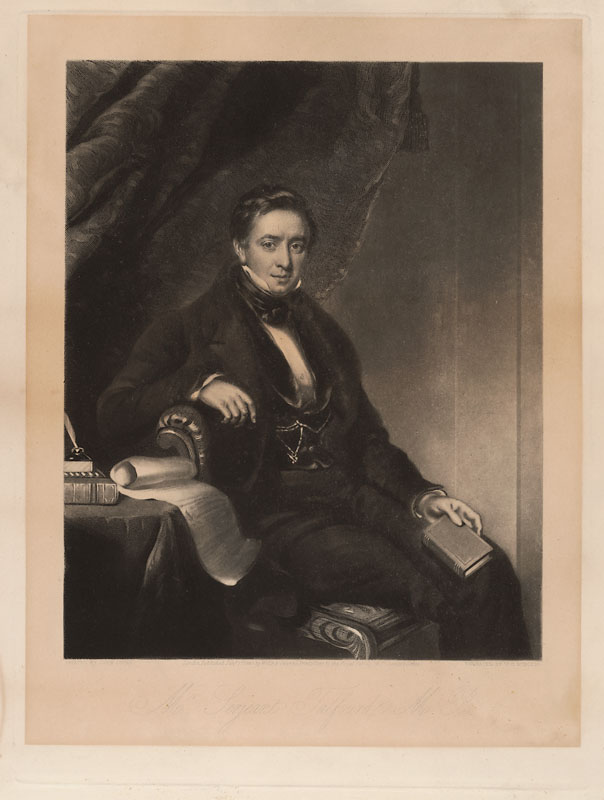
Sir Thomas Noon Talfourd, engraving from 1840.

Burgess was the son of Mary Oakley and Dr. Joseph Henry Burgess, the surgeon to the parish of St Giles in the Fields, London, where Burgess was baptised on 21 May 1816.

He became a pupil of mezzotint engraver Thomas Goff Lupton and remained under his tuition until the age of 20.

Some of his best productions are plates after the works of Sir Thomas Lawrence, published in the "Lawrence Gallery". He also engraved a large plate after Lawrence's portrait of the Duke of Wellington, remarkable for its admirably graduated tones, and the last works on which he was employed were three other portraits after Lawrence — Sir John Moore, the Duchess of Northumberland, and the Archbishop of Canterbury. The extraordinary delicacy which characterizes the work of this artist must have acquired for him the highest reputation in his art, had his life been spared.

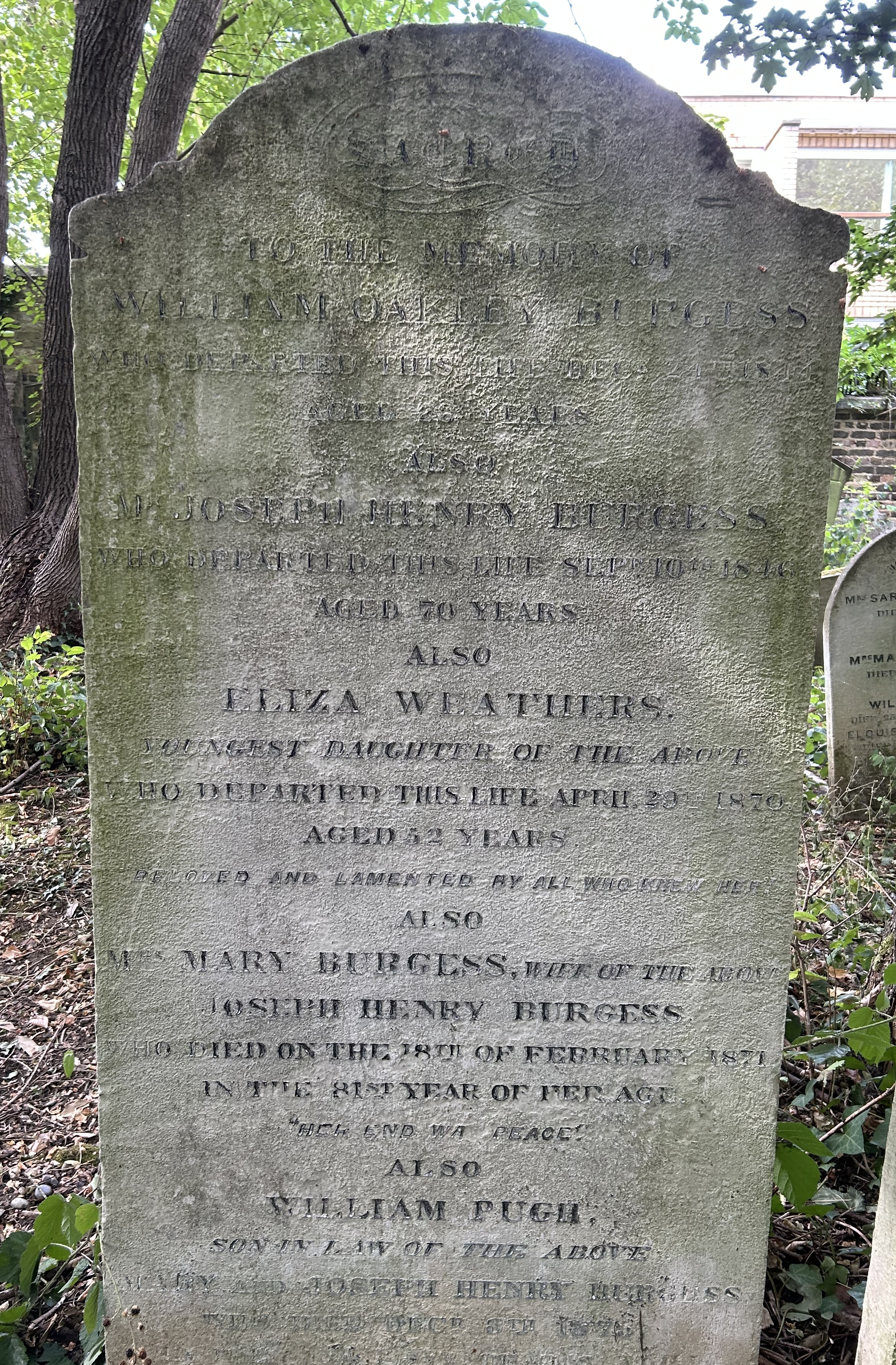
Grave of William Oakley Burgess in Highgate Cemetery

His death on 24 December 1844, at the age of 28, was caused by an abscess in the head, said to have arisen from a blow of a skittle-ball some years before. He is buried on the western side of Highgate Cemetery.

== Sources ==
- "Deaths". The Gentleman's Magazine. 177: 447. April 1845.
- "Biographical details". British Museum.
- "William Oakley Burgess". National Portrait Gallery.
