= Alfred Charles Whitman =

Alfred Charles Whitman (12 October 1860 – 2 February 1910) was a British print historian and museum curator, known for his books on the works of Valentine Green, Samuel William Reynolds, Samuel Cousins, and Charles Turner.

== Life ==
The youngest son of Edwin Whitman, a grocer, and his wife Fanny, he was born at Hammersmith on 12 October 1860, and was educated at St. Mark's College School, Chelsea. On leaving school he was employed by the London firm of Henry Dawson & Sons, typo-etching company, of Farringdon Street and Chiswick, with whom he remained till he was appointed on 21 December 1885 an attendant in the department of prints and drawings in the British Museum. He was noted for his "admirable qualities of tact, courtesy, and authority with which he fulfilled the duties" of managing the Print Room.

Whitman was promoted to the office of departmental clerk in the print department on 20 May 1903. His health began to fail in the autumn of 1908, and he died in London after a long illness, on 2 February 1910.

== Works ==
Whitman acquired a reputation as an authority on British mezzotint engraving. His earlier books, ‘The Masters of Mezzotint’ (1898) and ‘The Print Collector's Handbook’ (1901; new and enlarged edit. 1912), were of a popular character. He made also catalogues of eminent engravers' works, based on notes made in the British Museum, private collections and sale-rooms. Valentine Green, published in 1902 as part of a series "British Mezzotinters" to which other writers contributed under his direction, was followed by Samuel William Reynolds, published in 1903 as the first volume in a series of "Nineteenth Century Mezzotinters", with sequels Samuel Cousins (1904) and Charles Turner (1907). These two books rank among the best catalogues of an engraver's work produced in England.

For some years Whitman served in his spare time as amanuensis to Lady Charlotte Schreiber and assisted her in the arrangement and cataloguing of her collections of fans and playing-cards.

== Family ==
On 12 August 1885 Whitman married Helena Mary Bing at Hammersmith.

== Notes ==
Attribution

This article incorporates text from a publication now in the public domain: Stephen, Leslie, ed. (1885). "Whitman, Alfred Charles". Dictionary of National Biography. Vol. 3. London: Smith, Elder & Co.
