= Richard Earlom =

English mezzotinter

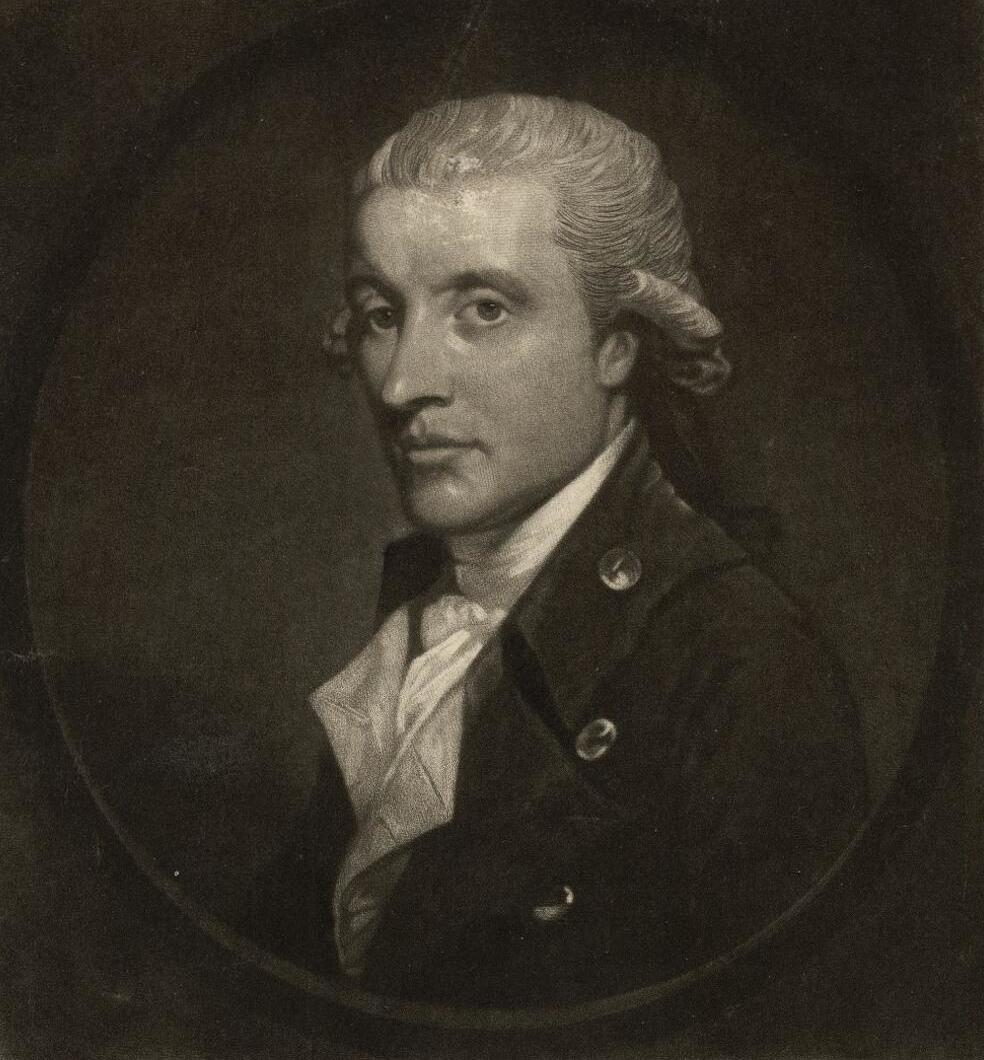
Thomas Goff Lupton after Gilbert Stuart, Richard Earlom, 1819, mezzotint, National Library of Wales

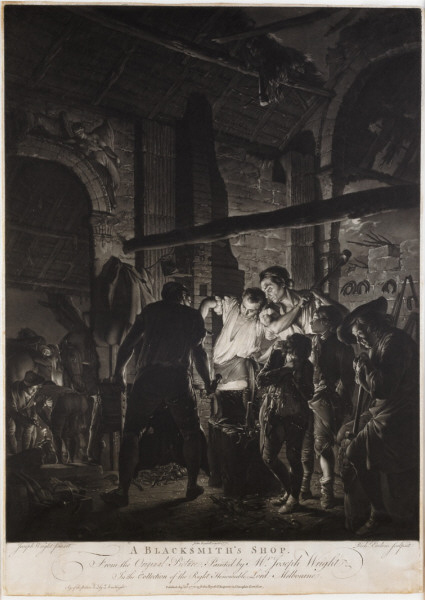
A Blacksmith's Shop (1771), after a painting by Joseph Wright.

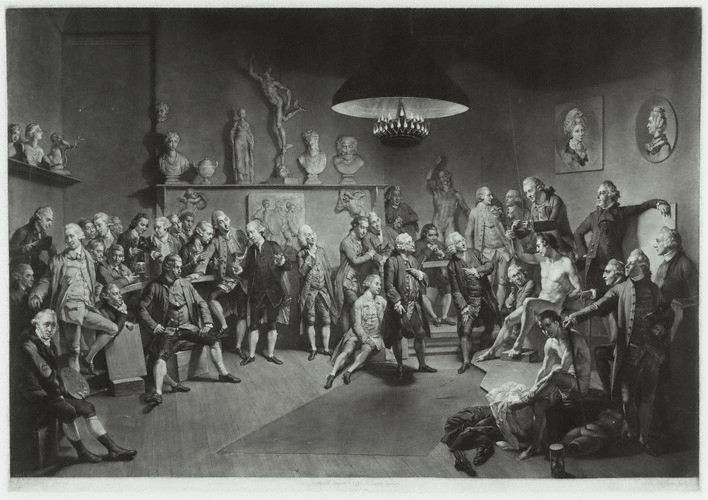
The Academicians of the Royal Academy (1773), after mezzotint by Johan Joseph Zoffany

Richard Earlom (bapt. 14 May 1743 – 9 October 1822) was an English mezzotinter.

== Biography ==
Earlom was born and died in London. His natural faculty for art appears to have been first called into exercise by his admiration for the lord mayor's state coach, which had just been decorated by Giovanni Battista Cipriani. He tried to copy the paintings, and was sent to study under Cipriani. He displayed great skill as a draughtsman, and at the same time acquired without assistance the art of mezzotint.

In 1765, Earlom was employed by Alderman Boydell, a publisher and promoter of the fine arts, to make a series of drawings from the pictures at Houghton Hall; and these he engraved in mezzotint. His best works are perhaps the fruit and flower pieces after the Dutch artists Van Os and Jan van Huysum. Among his historical and figure subjects are Agrippina, after Benjamin West; Love in Bondage, after Guido Reni; the Royal Academy, the Embassy of Hyderbeck to meet Lord Cornwallis, Colonel Mordant's Cock Fight and a Tiger Hunt, all after Johan Zoffany, and Lord Heathfield, after Sir Joshua Reynolds.

== Liber Veritatis ==
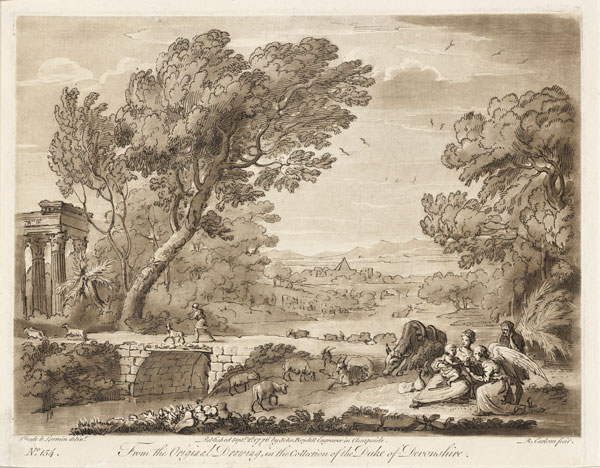
Earlom print of Liber Veritatis # 154, 1776

Earlom was commissioned by John Boydell to copy all 200 drawings of Claude Lorrain's record of his paintings as prints, which were published from 1774 to 1777, when a collected edition in two volumes was published as Liber Veritatis. Or, A Collection of Two Hundred Prints, After the Original Designs of Claude le Lorrain, in the Collection of His Grace the Duke of Devonshire, Executed by Richard Earlom, in the Manner and Taste of the Drawings.... with the inscription on the reverses, a "descriptive catalogue of each print" and the current owner, where it was known. A further volume of 100 prints after other Claude drawings from various British collections was added in 1819, also using "Liber Veritas" as its title. The title Liber Veritatis was invented for these reproductions, but is now used for the originals as well. These were then in a rebound book at Devonshire House in London; they are now in the British Museum.

The prints used etching for Claude's pen lines, and mezzotint for the ink washes, giving a good impression of the originals. All used brown ink on white paper, so disregarding the blue of half the original pages. The prints were a huge success, reprinted and the plates reworked to give increasingly detailed reproductions. They were recommended by drawing teachers as models for copying, and influenced the technique of English watercolour artists in particular, for example Francis Towne.
