= Liber Veritatis =

Book of drawings recording completed paintings by Claude Lorrain

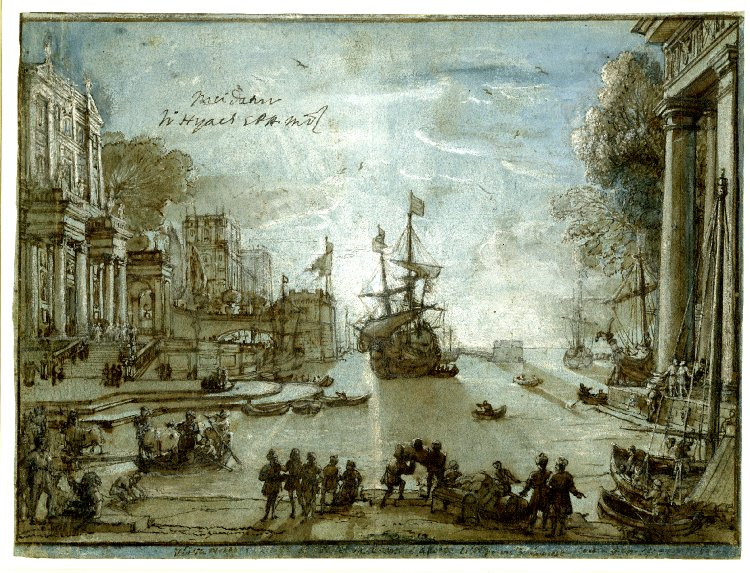
Liber Veritatis record of Seaport with Ulysses returning Chryseis to her father (from Homer)

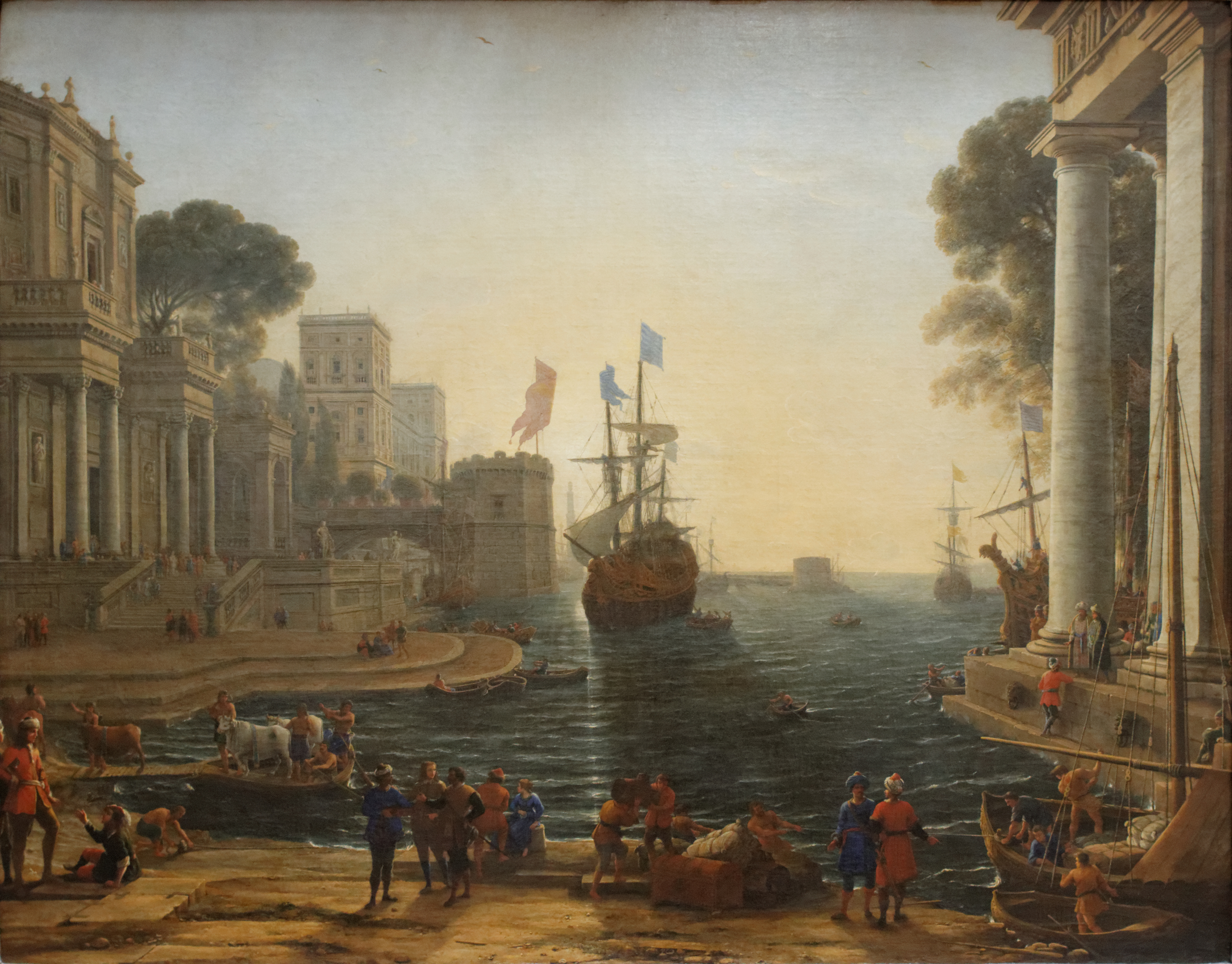
The painting, in the Louvre, 1644

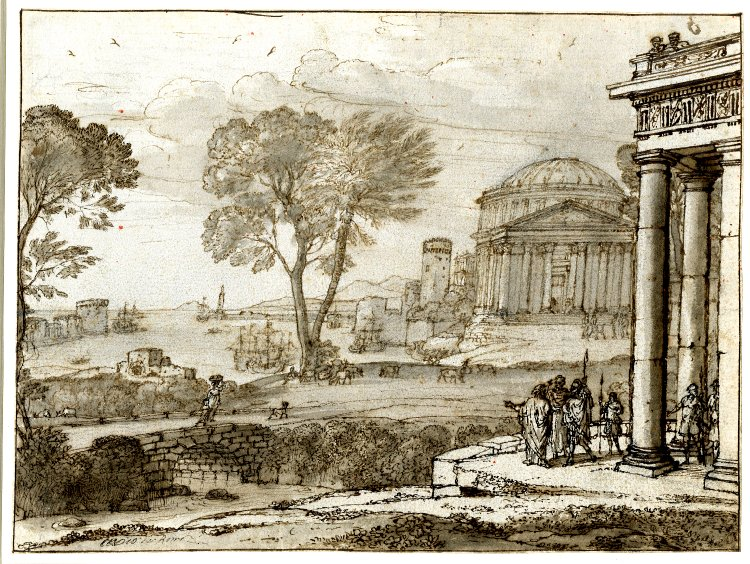
LV 179, for painting see below

The Liber Veritatis, meaning Book of Truth in Latin, is a book of drawings recording his completed paintings made by Claude Lorrain, known in English as "Claude". Claude was a landscape painter in Rome, who began keeping this record in 1635/6, as he began to be highly successful, and maintained it until his death in 1682. The book is now in the British Museum, and was owned by the Dukes of Devonshire from the 1720s until 1957. It was reproduced in print form from 1774 to 1777 by Richard Earlom and had a considerable influence on British landscape art. The title Liber Veritatis was apparently invented for these reproductions, but is now also used for the original.

The drawings, like most by Claude, combine pen and wash (watercolour), the latter brown or grey, and often both. There are often highlights added in white bodycolour, and less often touches in other colours, such as gold and blue.

The original book was a sketchbook made up of alternating groups of white and blue pages, in fours, with an average page size of 19.4 by 25.7 cm (7.6 by 10.1 in). Claude began with a self-portrait, then gave each painting a page, usually noting a few details on the reverse of the drawing: a reference number, a signature, the name of the patron and where he was from (if not local), and often a note of the subject. After some years he began to add dates. There are 195 paintings covered in this way. The book has since been added to and rebound, which is covered below. There are two handwritten indices, at least the first of which is now regarded as written by Claude himself.

Such a record of an artist's work is exceptionally rare from this or earlier periods, and has greatly helped scholars; drawings are noted in the literature on the paintings as e.g. "LV 123". Claude told his biographer Filippo Baldinucci, to whom he showed it at the end of his life, that he kept the record as a defence against other painters passing their work off as his, as had already begun to happen when he started it. The drawings became increasingly elaborate as the years went by, until "the book became his most precious possession and virtually an end in itself as a work of art".

== Painting to drawing ==
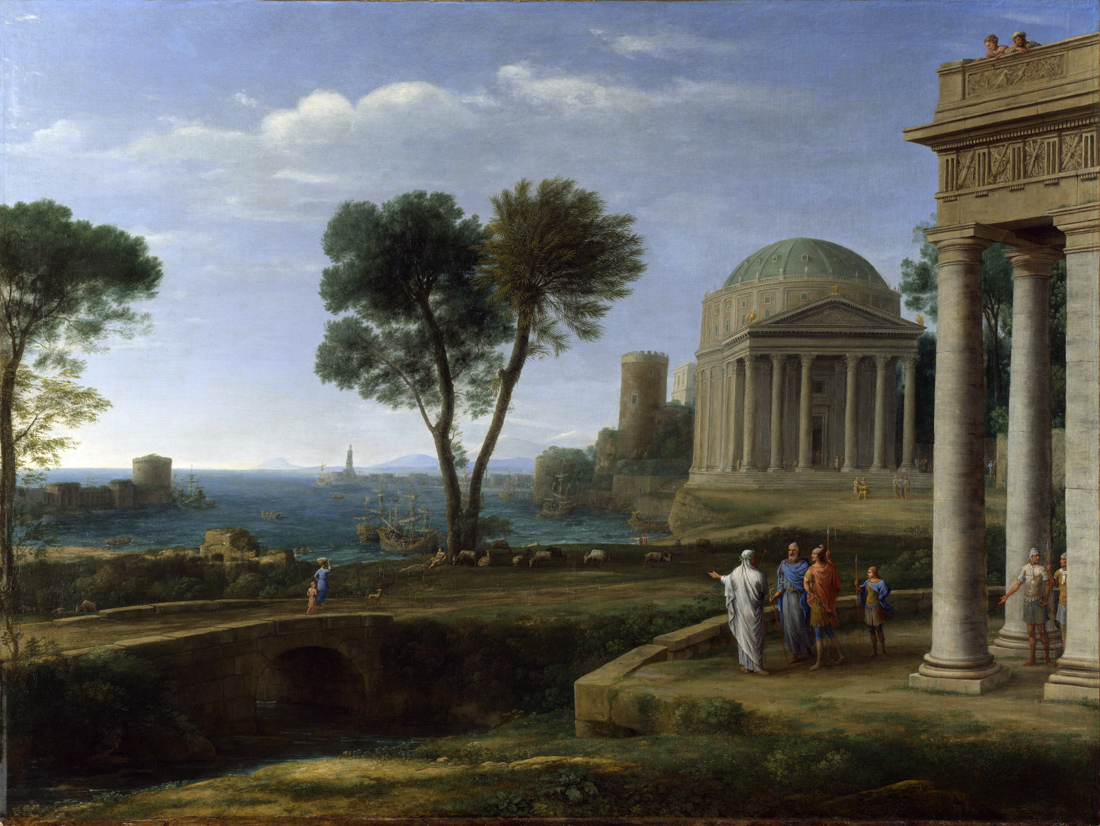
Landscape with Aeneas at Delos, National Gallery, 1672

The drawings of the Liber Veritatis are records of completed works, the reverse of the preparatory sketches and modelli often made by Claude and other artists before or during the work of painting. Such drawings for recording purposes are usually hard to distinguish from preparatory drawings, and Claude's systematic approach is exceptional. Claude's last painting, Ascanius Shooting the Stag of Sylvia (1682, Ashmolean Museum, Oxford) is not quite finished, and does not appear in the book; it is assumed it was still on the easel at his death, and so the drawing for the book not yet done.

The pages of the sketchbook were filled by the drawings, using a "portrait" or "landscape" format as appropriate. The compositions were therefore often slightly squeezed or stretched to allow for the different aspect ratio of the sketchbook compared to the painting. In general the composition is very faithfully copied, increasingly so as the series continues. However, details of foliage in particular are sometimes freely adapted. The Landscape with Hagar and the Angel in the National Gallery, London (NG 61, dated 1646) is apparently recorded by LV 106, but while the painting is in a vertical "portrait" format, the drawing is in a horizontal "landscape" format. In the drawing some details are altered, and the mountain in the centre, and the vegetation at either side are extended.

Not every painting now accepted as by Claude is shown. Begun in 1635, for the first two years Claude's updating of the book seems to have been erratic. Smaller works, and second versions of a subject, which Claude often produced, are often omitted. The series was apparently begun on loose sheets, but before long Claude had these and many blank sheets bound as a book. The end of the original book was apparently reached with LV 185 on 25 March 1675, as Claude's note on the reverse records, but other sheets were added.

== History ==
By a specific mention of it in his will, Claude left the book to his adopted daughter Agnese, who is usually thought to have been his actual daughter by a servant. She seems to have died by 1716, and it passed to Claude's nephew Joseph. It was in Paris around 1717, when a second index in French seems to have been added, recording the current owners of the painting. It may have been rebound by this stage. The book was bought by William Cavendish, 2nd Duke of Devonshire in the early 1720s. It was probably kept at Devonshire House in London, where it was seen by Gustav Friedrich Waagen in 1835. However, it was not easily available to artists, and the print version was a revelation to the booming English landscape art scene. This long period of limited access and little handling has kept the drawings in "exceptionally fine" condition, despite the paper being thin.

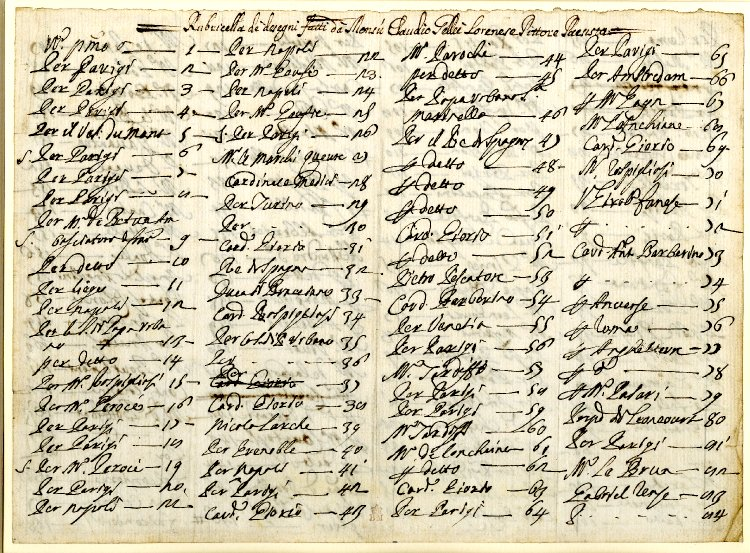
One of the index pages, giving the owners of the paintings

By the end of the 18th century the book had been disassembled and the sheets mounted individually and placed in a new binding. The mounts, of sugar paper, were cut away to allow the reverses of the sheets to be seen. Five extra Claude drawings were added, to make a complement of 200.

By 1850 the book had moved to Chatsworth House in Derbyshire, the Devonshire country seat. In 1957 it was ceded to the nation as part of the inheritance tax settlement after the death of the 9th Duke, and placed in the British Museum. It was represented by photographs of some pages in the first major exhibition of Claude in 1969 (in Newcastle-upon-Tyne and London) "partly on grounds of security and cost" and because only one page could have been displayed. In the 1970s it was disassembled and the pages mounted individually; pages have subsequently been lent to various exhibitions.

== Reproductions ==
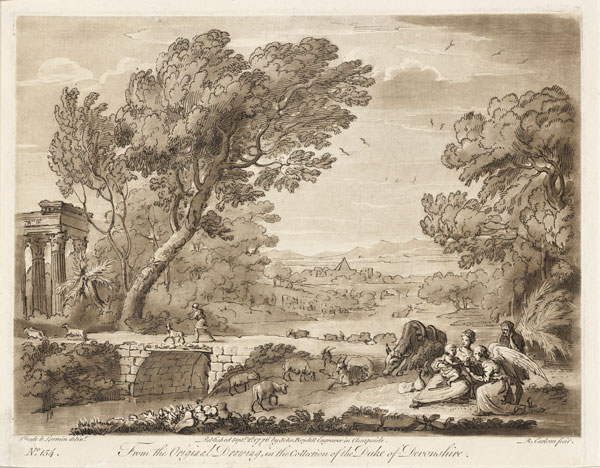
Earlom print of LV 154, 1776

Richard Earlom, a leading English printmaker, was commissioned by John Boydell to copy all 200 drawings as prints, which were published from 1774 to 1777, when a collected edition in two volumes was published as Liber Veritatis. Or, A Collection of Two Hundred Prints, After the Original Designs of Claude le Lorrain, in the Collection of His Grace the Duke of Devonshire, Executed by Richard Earlom, in the Manner and Taste of the Drawings.... with the inscription on the reverses, a "descriptive catalogue of each print" and the current owner, where it was known. A further volume of 100 prints after other Claude drawings from various British collections was added in 1819, also using "Liber Veritas" as its title.

The prints used etching for Claude's pen lines, and mezzotint for the ink washes, giving a good impression of the originals. All used brown ink on white paper, so disregarding the blue of half the original pages. The prints were a huge success, reprinted and the plates reworked to give increasingly detailed reproductions. They were recommended by drawing teachers as models for copying, and influenced the technique of English watercolour artists in particular, for example Francis Towne.

Another full set of print reproductions after the Liber Veritatis, by Ludovico Caracciolo, was published in Rome in 1815. Caracciolo was an Italian landscapist, who became a protege of Elizabeth Foster, the second duchess of the 5th Duke, who moved to Rome after she was widowed in 1811. All the pages were reproduced in a book on the Liber Veritatis by Michael Kitson, and all are now available online on the British Museum website.

The Liber Veritatis inspired J. M. W. Turner to assemble his Liber Studiorum (Latin: Book of Studies, a collection of 71 prints after his paintings and watercolours printed from 1807 to 1819. Some later artists adopted the name Liber Veritatis for their own similar drawn records of their work, including Andreas Schelfhout (1787–1870), a Dutch landscapist, and the Swiss painter Eugène Burnand (1850–1921).

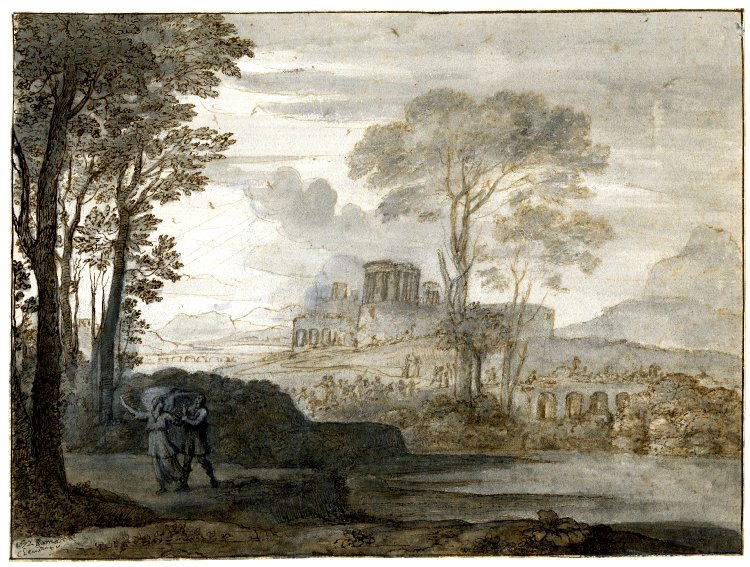
Drawing of a painting in the Hermitage Museum (the painting)

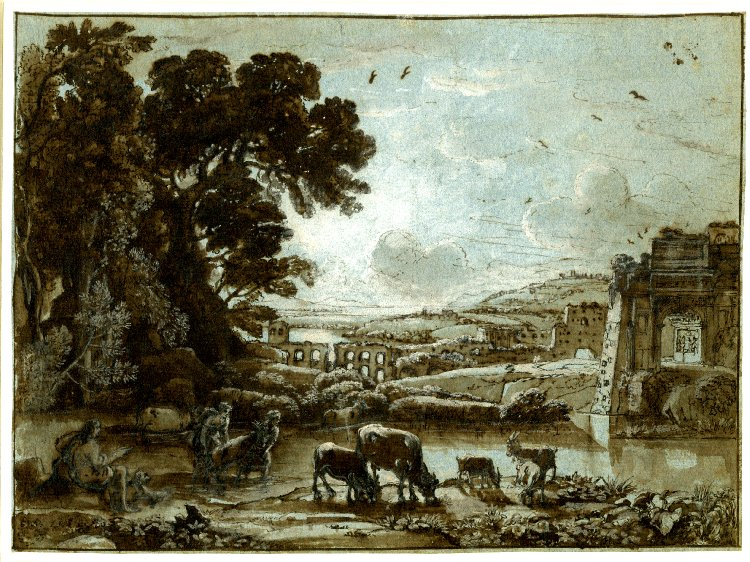
Drawing of Pastoral landscape with the Arch of Titus at Longford Castle

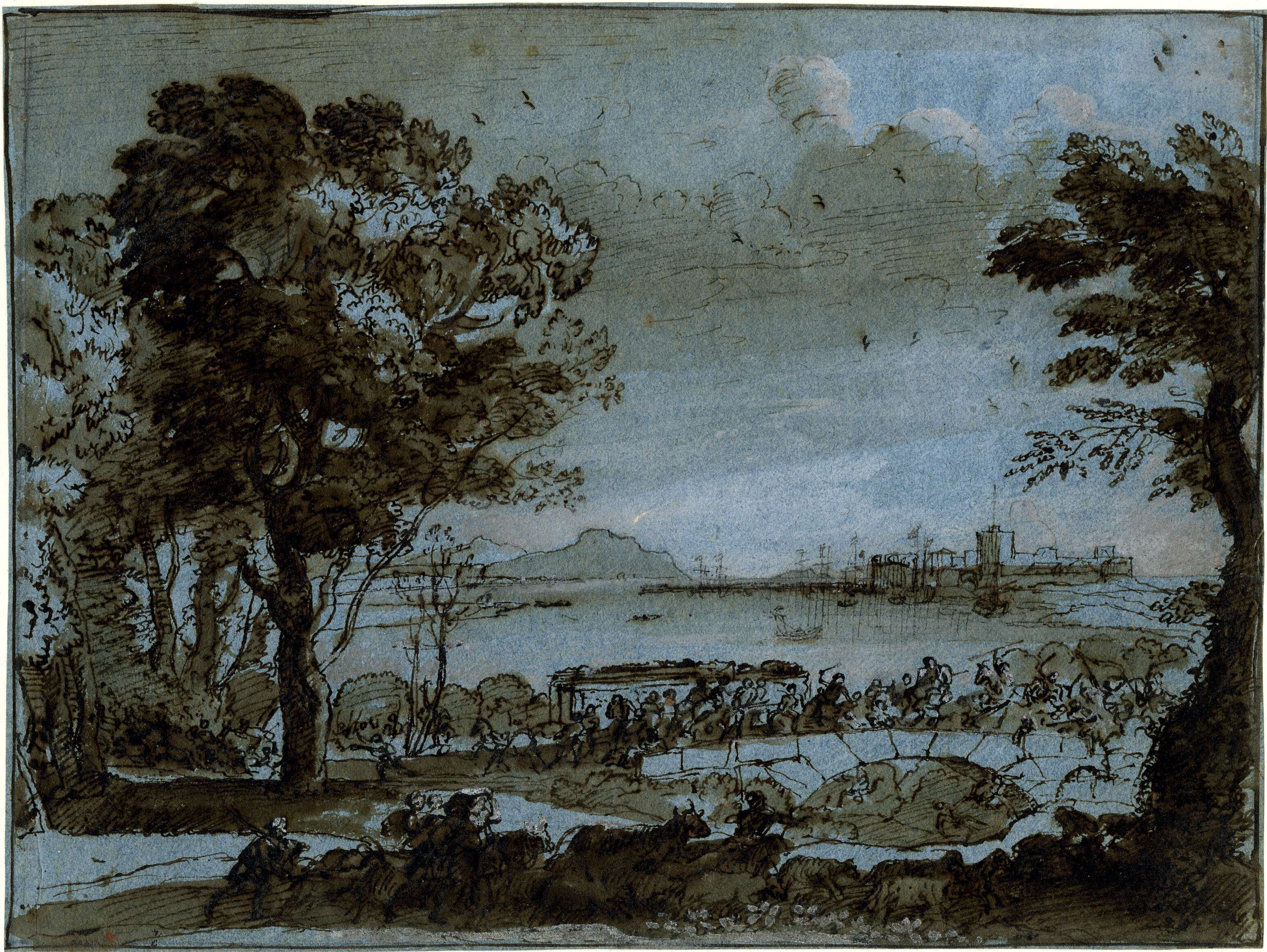
LV 137, Coast scene with a battle on a bridge, of which two painted versions are known (one in the Pushkin Museum).

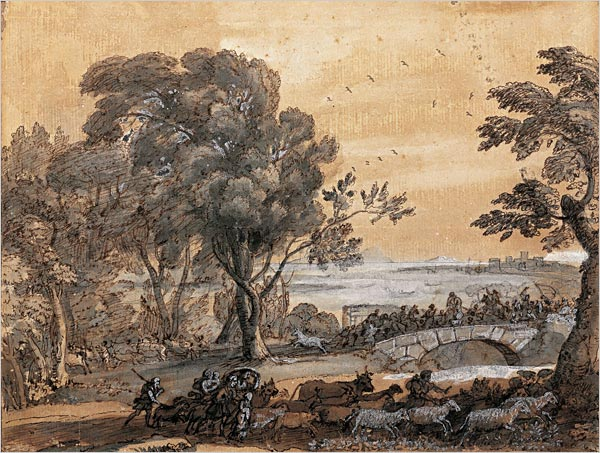
Another drawing, not in the book, of the same painting
