= The Battle of the Milvian Bridge (Claude) =

Painting by Claude Lorrain

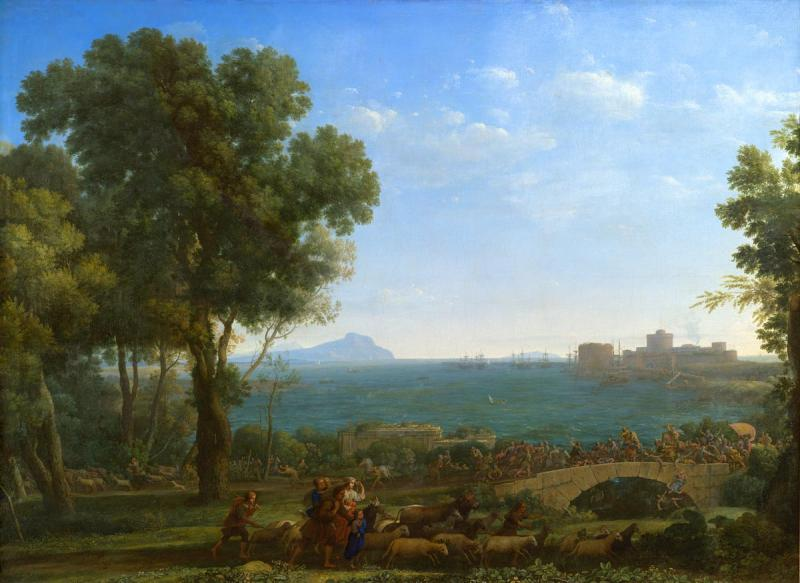
The Battle of the Milvian Bridge (1655) by Claude Lorrain

The Battle of the Milvian Bridge, The Battle of the Bridge or The Battle Between the Emperors Maxentius and Constantine is a 1655 oil on canvas painting by Claude Lorrain, now in the Pushkin Museum in Moscow. Despite the title (referring to the Battle of the Milvian Bridge), according to E. B. Sharnova, the painting has no historical specificity.
