= William Walker (Scottish engraver) =

Scottish engraver

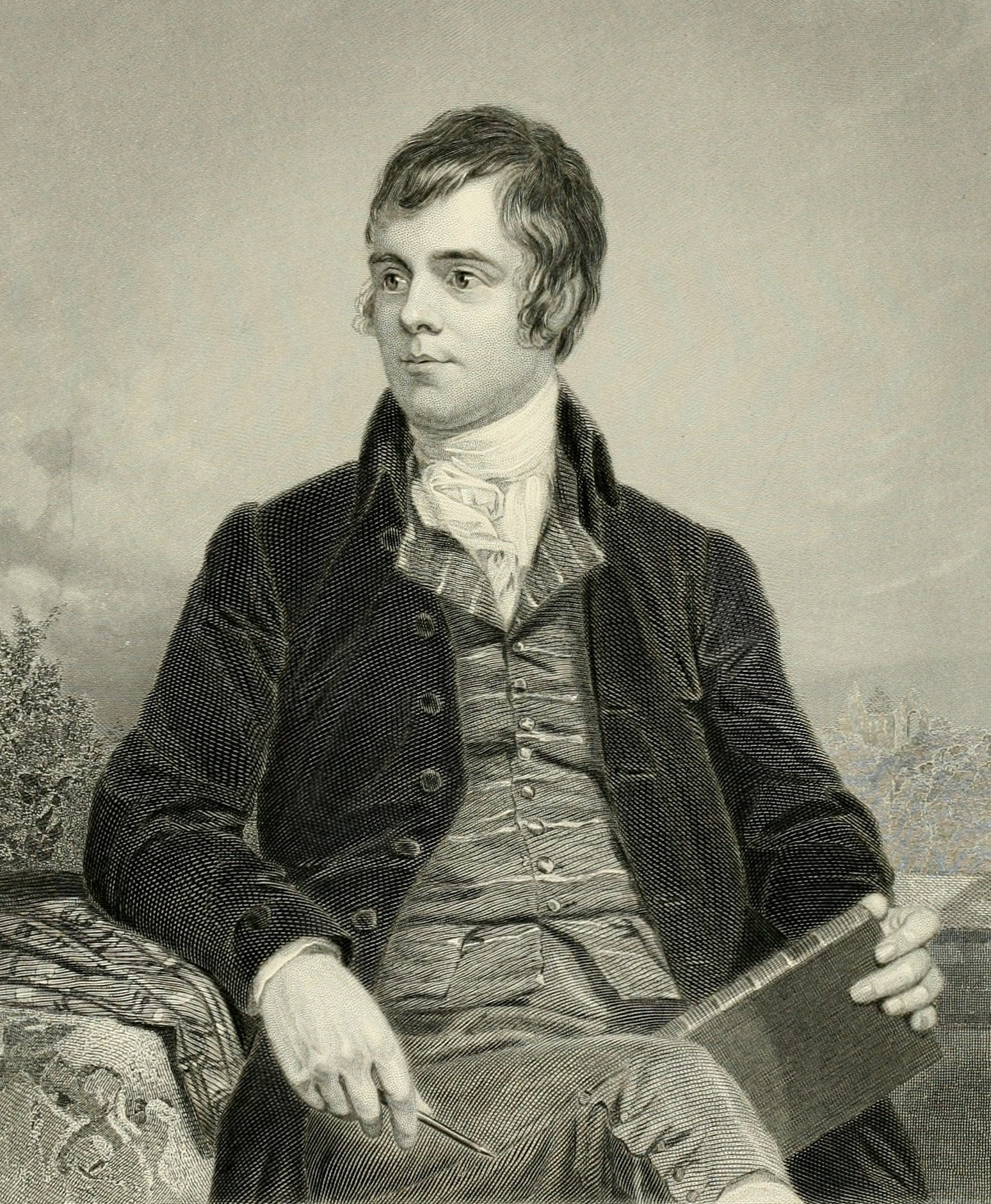
Engraved version of the Alexander Nasmyth 1787 portrait

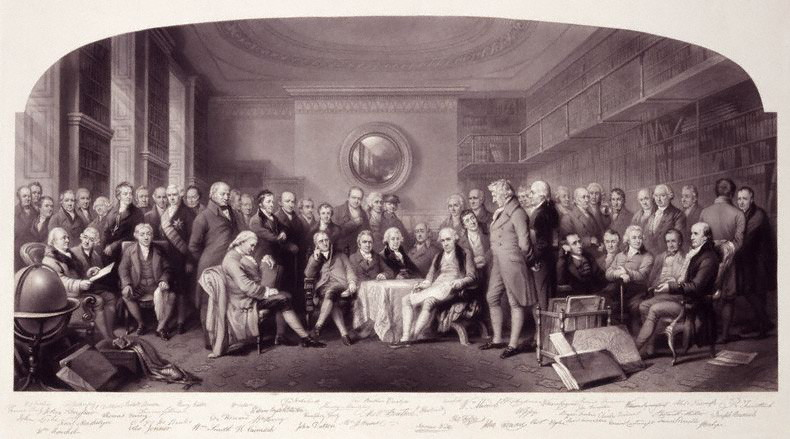
Distinguished Men of Science. Use the cursor to see who is who.

William Walker (1 August 1791 – 7 September 1867) was a Scottish engraver. He is known for engravings of Sir Henry Raeburn's portraits of Sir Walter Scott and Raeburn himself, Sir Thomas Lawrence's portrait of Lord Broughham (commissioned by Walker), and Alexander Nasmyth's portrait of Robert Burns.

== Biography ==
Walker was born on 1 August 1791 at Markton, Musselburgh, near Edinburgh.

In 1815, Walker went to London to study as a stipple engraver under Thomas Woolnoth. He established his reputation by engraving a large plate of Sir Henry Raeburn's equestrian portrait of John Hope, 4th Earl of Hopetoun. In 1829, on his marriage to Elizabeth Reynolds, the famous miniaturist, he settled at 64 Margaret Street, where he resided until his death. Walker's work consists of about one hundred portraits of eminent contemporaries, after various oil painters, chiefly in mezzotint, all published by himself. Additionally, Walker created some interesting subject-pieces.

His most famous work is the engraving of Robert Burns based on Alexander Nasmyth's famous portrait. This engraving was used many times in printed versions of Burns' poems.

He died at his house in Margaret Street, London, on 7 September 1867. His grave is in Brompton Cemetery.

== Sculptural work ==
Whilst being principally remembered as an engraver, Walker was also an able sculptor, his notable work being the figure of Queen Elizabeth I on the Scott Monument on Princes Street in Edinburgh.
