= Samuel Cousins =

British engraver (1801–1887)

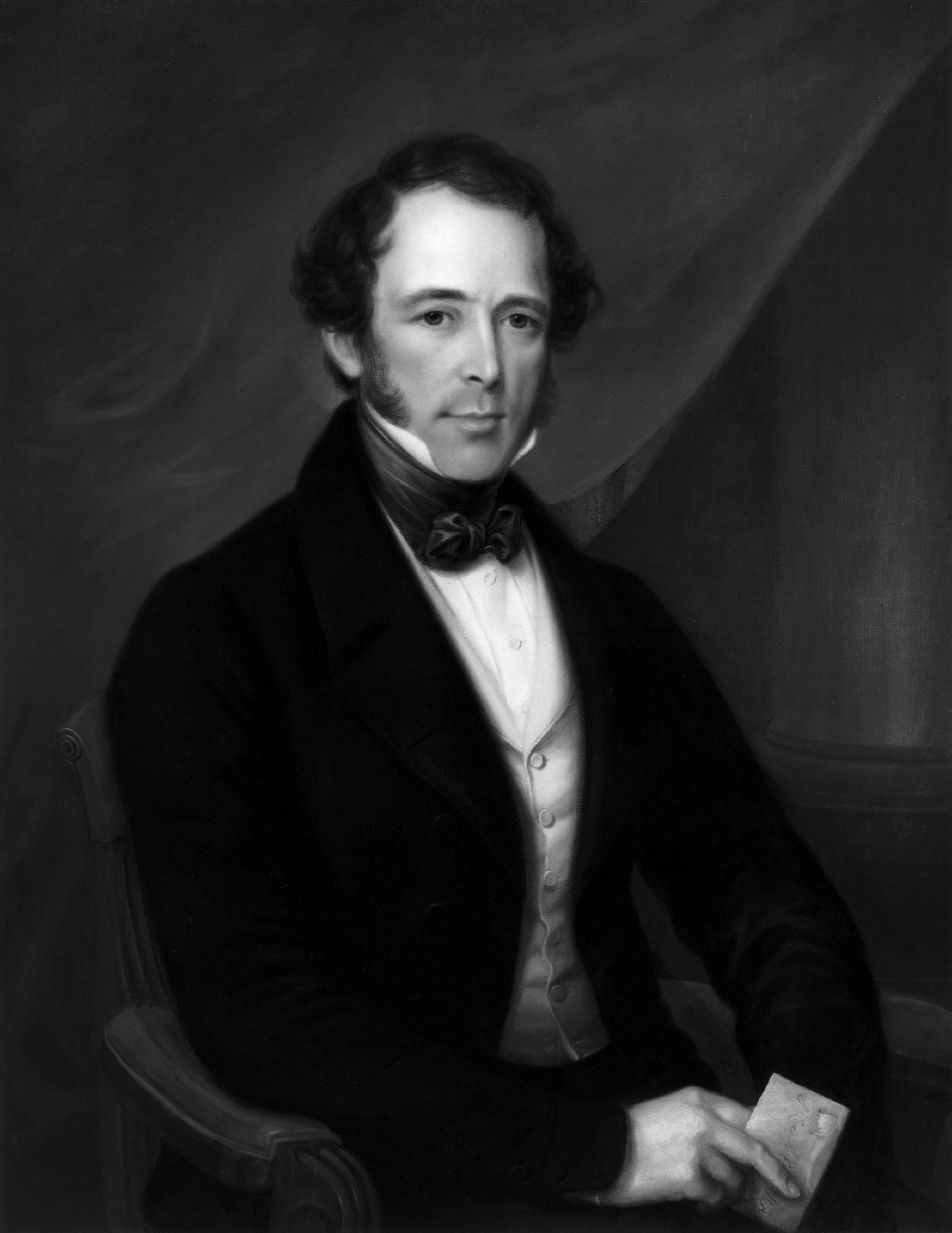
Samuel Cousins by James Leakey, 1843 (National Portrait Gallery, London)

Samuel Cousins RA (9 May 1801 in Exeter – 7 May 1887 in London) was a British mezzotinter.

== Life ==
Cousins was born at Exeter. In 1855 he was elected a full member of the Royal Academy, to which he later gave in trust £15,000 to provide annuities for superannuated artists. One of the most important figures in the history of British engraving, he died in London, unmarried, in 1887 and was buried in a family grave (no.12697) on the western side of Highgate Cemetery.

== Works ==
Cousins was preeminently the interpreter of Sir Thomas Lawrence, his contemporary. During his apprenticeship to Samuel William Reynolds he engraved many of the best amongst the three hundred and sixty little mezzotints illustrating the works of Sir Joshua Reynolds which his master issued in his own name. In the finest of his numerous transcripts of Lawrence, such as Lady Acland and her Sons, Pope Pius VII and Master Lambton, the distinguishing characteristics of the engravers work, brilliancy and force of effect in a high key, corresponded exactly with similar qualities in the painter.

After the introduction of steel for engraving purposes about the year 1823, Cousins and his contemporaries were compelled to work on it, because the soft copper previously used for mezzotint plates did not yield a sufficient number of fine impressions to enable the method to compete commercially against line engraving, from which much larger editions were obtainable. The painterly quality which distinguished the 18th-century mezzotints on copper was wanting in his later works, because the hardness of the steel on which they were engraved impaired freedom of execution and richness of tone, and so enhanced the labor of scraping that he accelerated the work by stipple, etching the details instead of scraping them out of the ground in the manner of his predecessors. To this mixed style, previously used by Richard Earlom on copper, Cousins added heavy roulette and rocking-tool textures, tending to fortify the darks, when he found that the burr even on steel failed to yield enough fine impressions to meet high demand. The effect of his prints in this method after Reynolds and Millais was mechanical and out of harmony with the picturesque technique of these painters, but the phenomenal popularity which Cousins gained for his works at least kept alive and in favor a form of mezzotint engraving during a critical phase of its history. Abraham Raimbach, the line engraver, dated the decline of his own art in England from the appearance in 1837 of Cousins's print (in the mixed style) after Landseer's Bolton Abbey. Such plates as Miss Peel, after Lawrence (published in 1833); A Midsummer Nights Dream, after Landseer (1857); The Order of Release and The First Minuet, after Millais (1856 and 1868); The Strawberry Girl and Lavinia, Countess Spencer, after Reynolds; and Miss Rich, after Hogarth (1873-1877), represent various stages of Cousins's mixed method. It reached its final development in the plates after Millais's Cherry Ripe and Pomona, published in 1881 and 1882, when the invention of facing copper-plates with a film of steel to make them yield larger editions led to the revival of pure mezzotint on copper, which rendered obsolete the steel plate and the mixed style which it fostered. The fine draughtsmanship of Cousins was as apparent in his prints as in his original lead-pencil portraits exhibited in London in 1882.

== Gallery ==
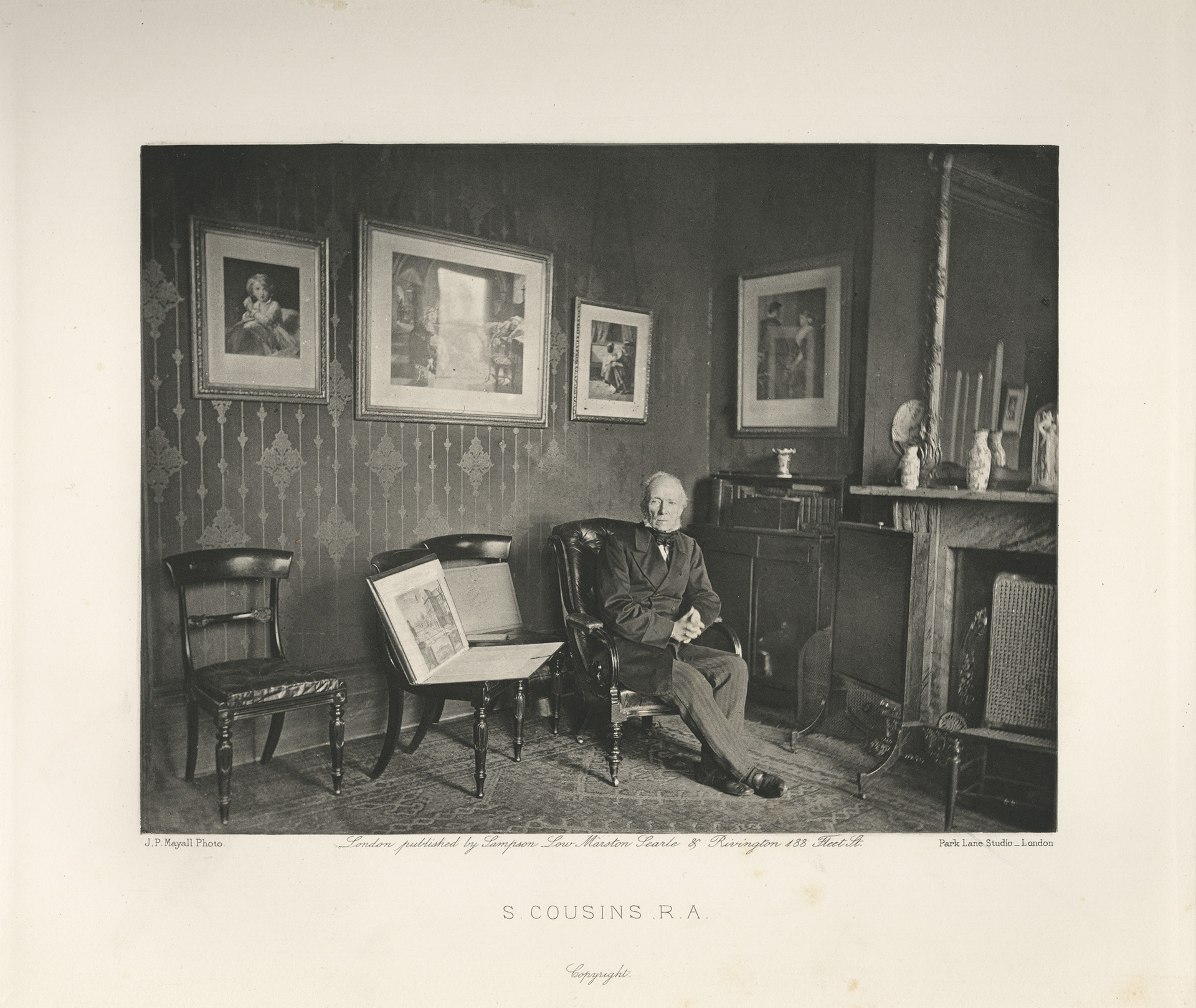
Samuel Cousins by J. P. Mayall from Artists at Home, photogravure, published 1884, Department of Image Collections, National Gallery of Art Library, Washington, DC

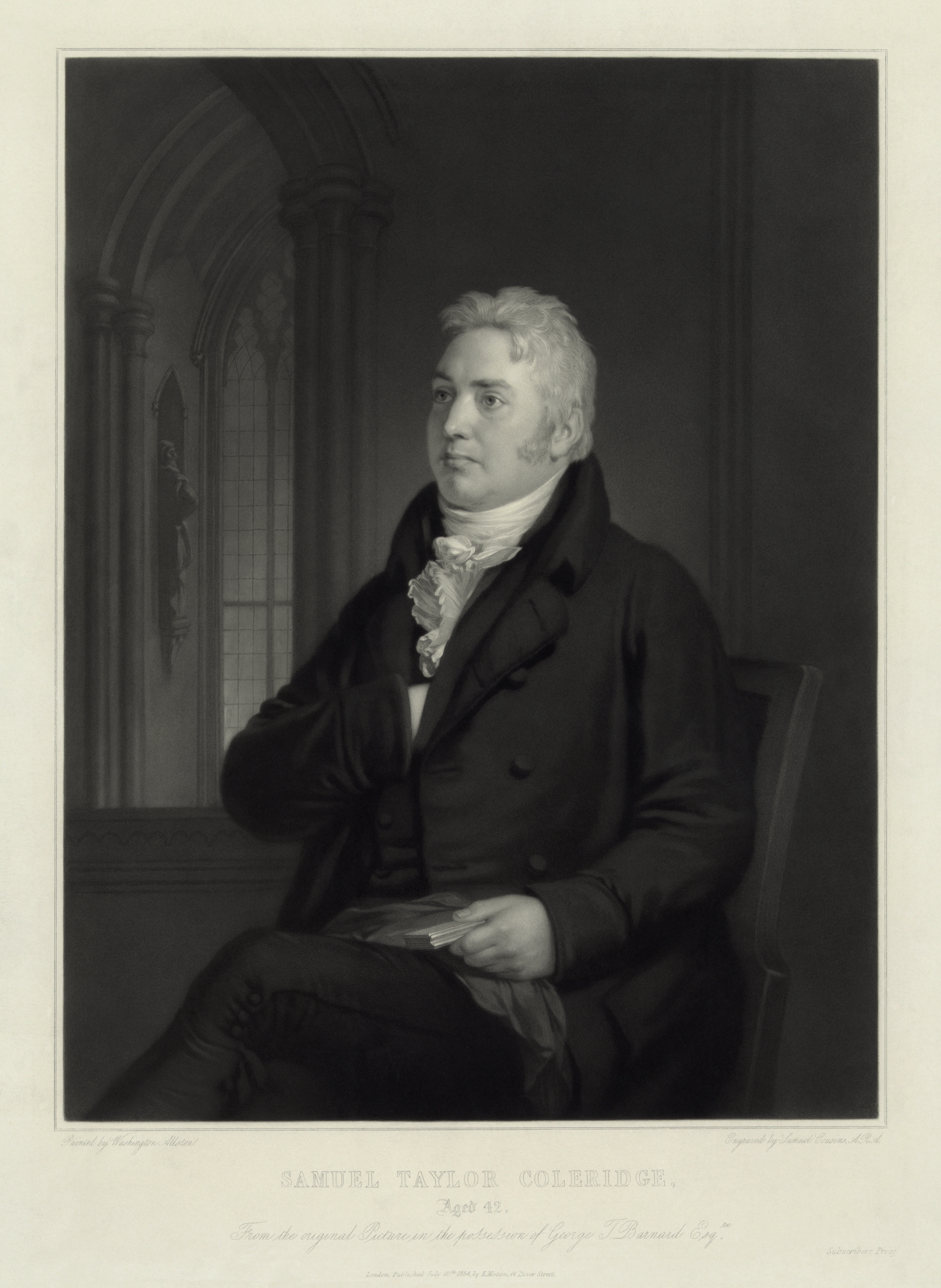
Samuel Taylor Coleridge at age 42, engraving by Samuel Cousins from a portrait by Washington Allston. Digitally restored.

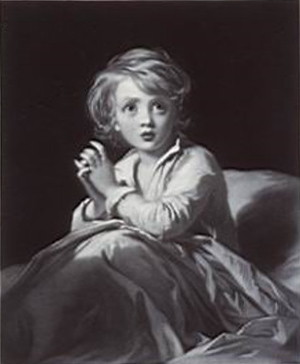
Speak Lord For Thy Servant Hears (after James Sant), 1854

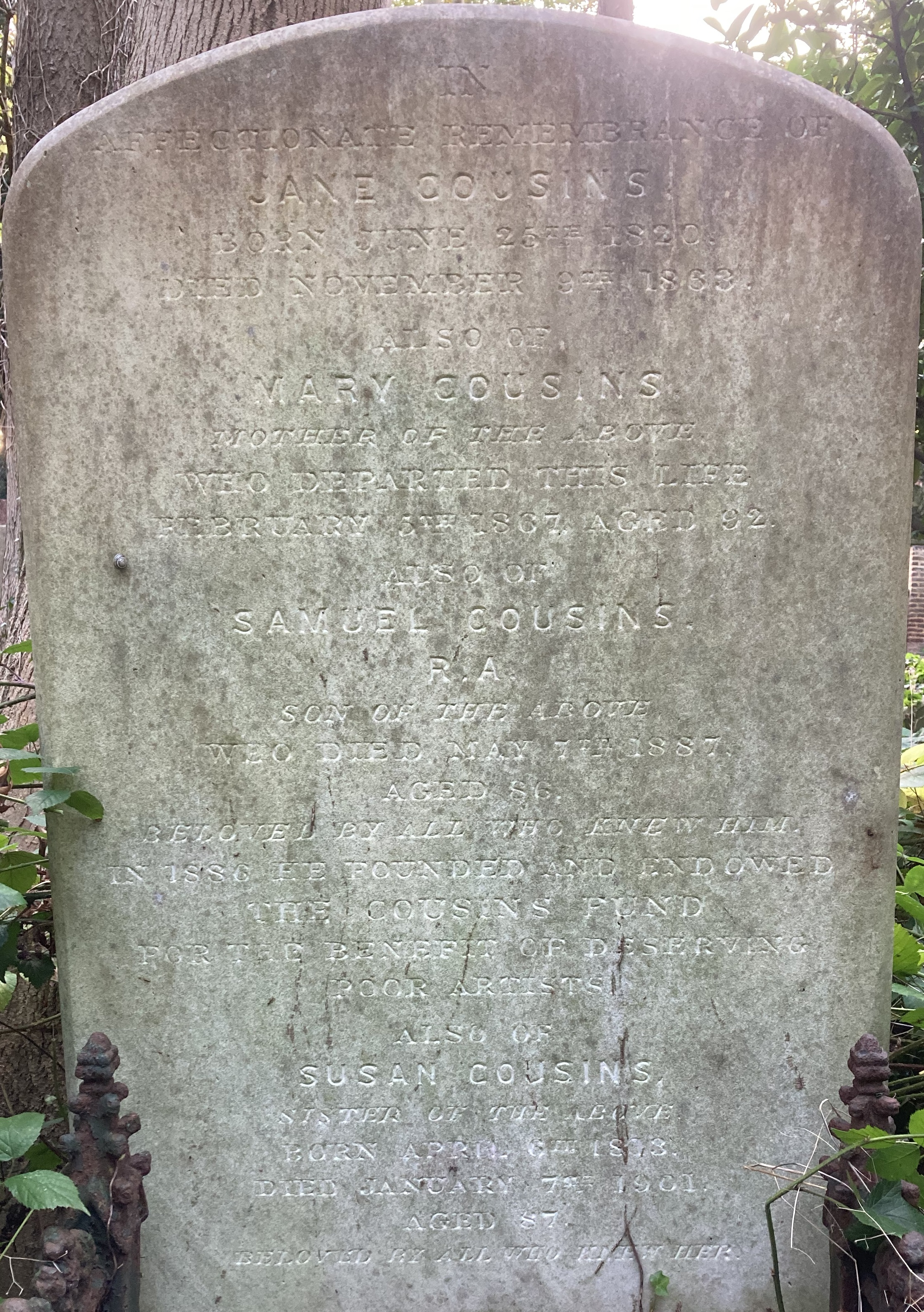
Family grave of Samuel Cousins in Highgate Cemetery
