= Liber Studiorum =

Collection of prints by J. M. W. Turner

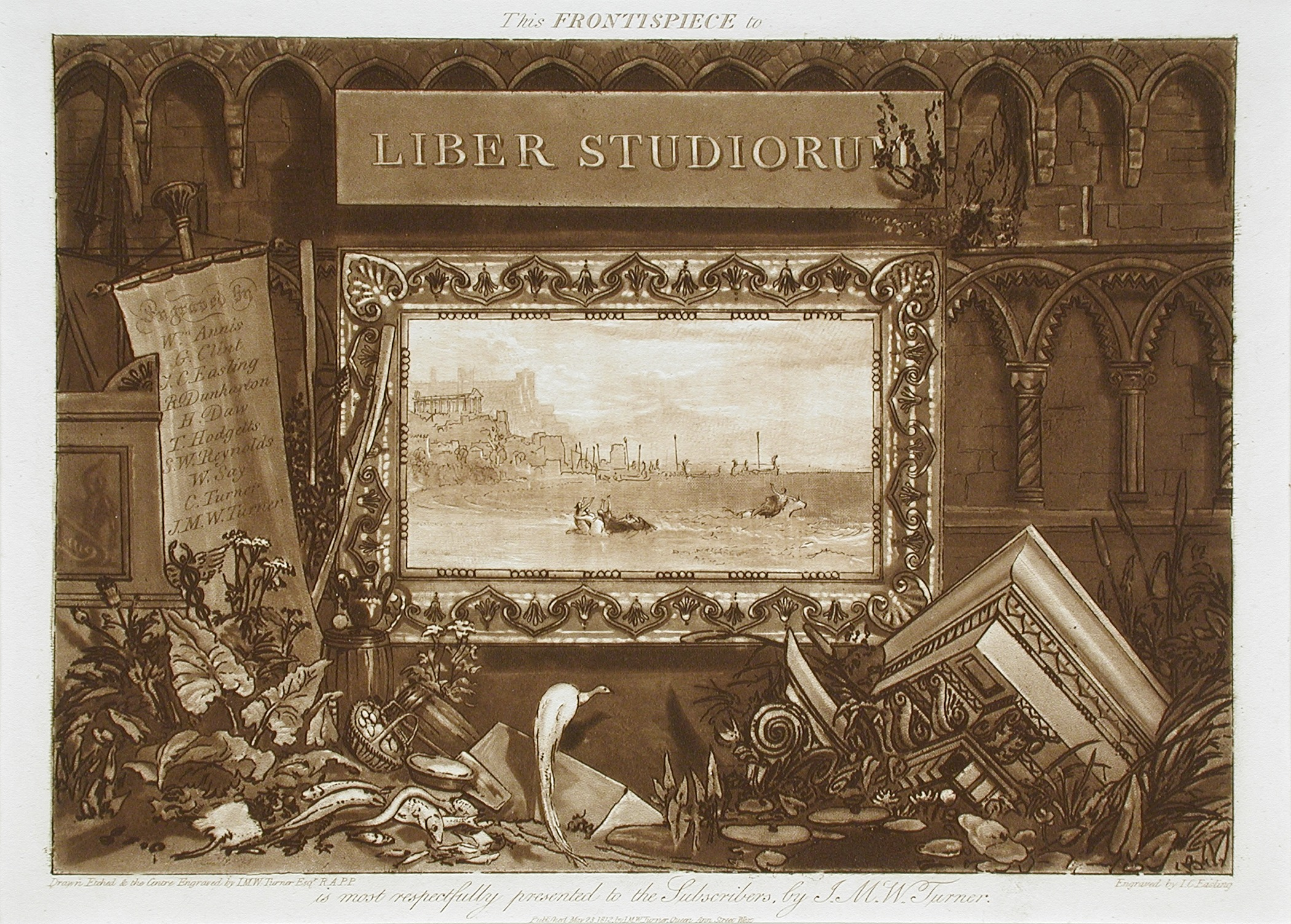
- The frontispiece
- Author: J. M. W. Turner
- Publication date: 1807

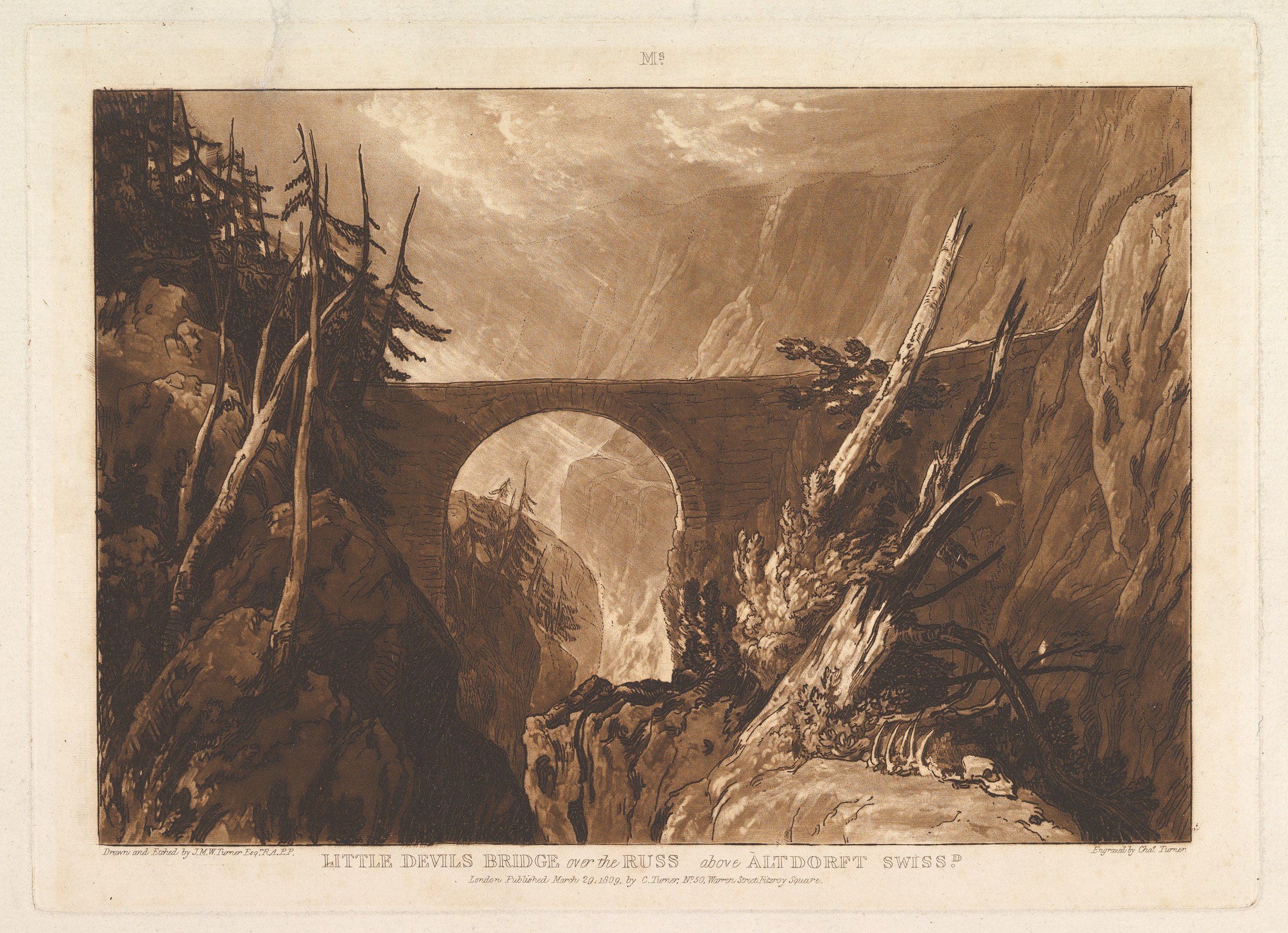
Little Devils Bridge over the Russ above Altdorft Swiss.d, from Liber Studiorum, part IV. Impression in the Metropolitan Museum of Art

Liber Studiorum (Latin: Book of Studies) is a collection of prints by J. M. W. Turner, made up of 71 landscape images. Turner dedicated 12 years to this project, from 1807 to 1819.

For the production of the prints, Turner created the etchings for the prints, which were worked in mezzotint by his collaborating engravers. The original models for the printmakers to follow were mainly in sepia watercolour, sometimes with elements in pencil and other media. Altogether there are over 100 paintings relating to the series, included some not published in the end. There are also numerous less formal drawings and watercolour studies in the Tate of the same subjects made by Turner on the spot or later.

Subsequent to the initial printing, the late 19th, early 20th century artist Frank Short made successful reprintings with the plates, though many of the finer details had worn down.

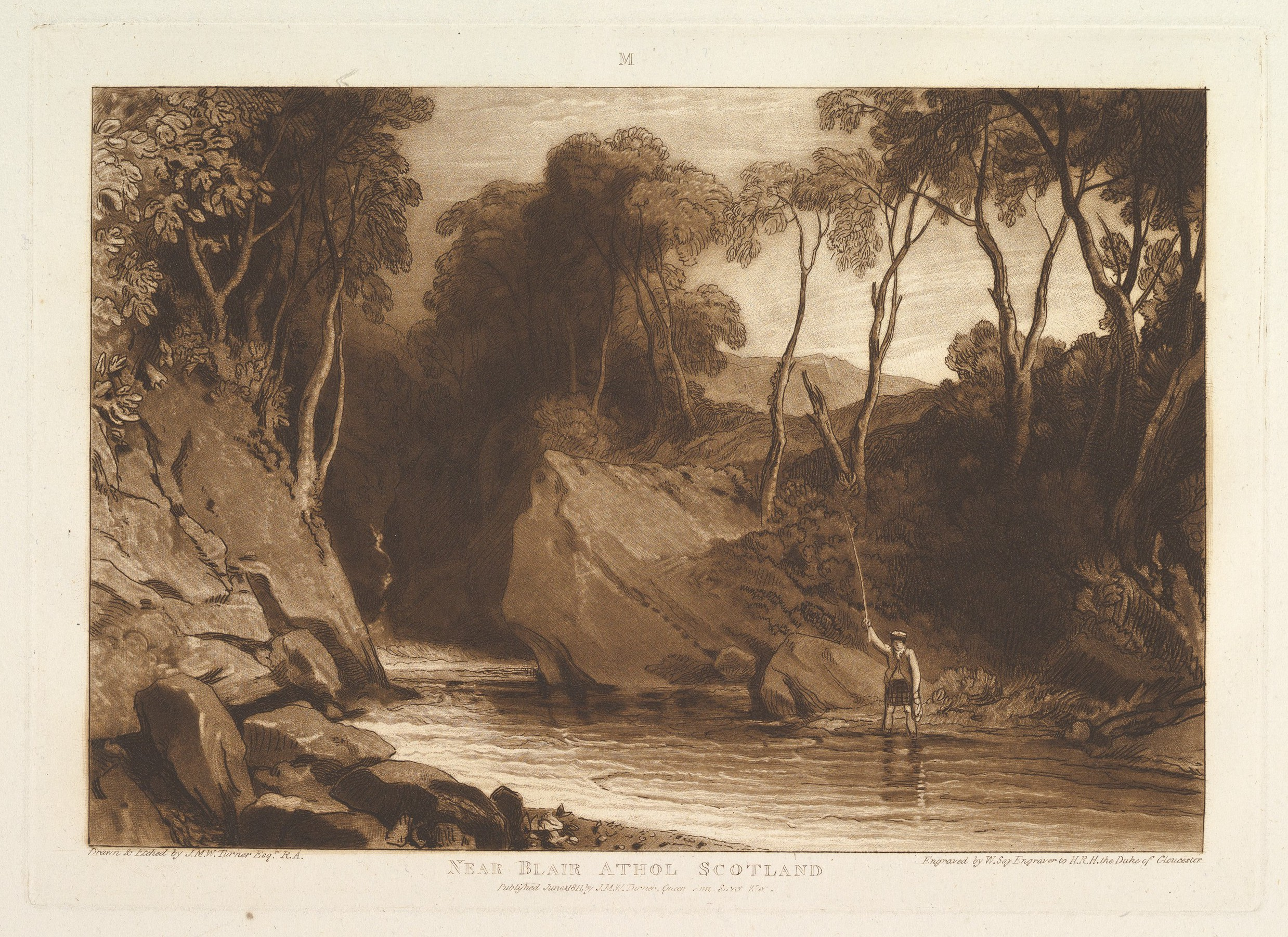
Near Blair Athol, Scotland, from Liber Studiorum, part VI. This copy is in the Metropolitan Museum of Art

The Liber Studiorum was an expression of his intentions for landscape art. Loosely based on Claude Lorrain's Liber Veritatis (Book of Truth), the plates were meant to be widely disseminated, and categorised the genre into six types: Marine, Mountainous, Pastoral, Historical, Architectural, and Elevated or Epic Pastoral. While Claude aimed his Liber at an academic audience, Turner intended his for the general public.

Turner had been criticized for deviating from the style of Old Masters, which at the time was considered the ideal academic aesthetic – in particular by Sir George Beaumont, an art connoisseur and his lifelong critic. According to Ridings and Jones, "we can see how this project deliberately confronted issues surrounding both Turner's work and the status of the British landscape school in comparison with that of the old masters" and that Turner's intention was to "make the specific point that the Old Masters should not be copied, but only used as a source inspiration."

The original plates were part of the Turner Bequest and are now kept in the Tate Britain museum. The print rooms of the Tate Britain museum, the Metropolitan Museum of Art, and the Art Institute of Chicago possess complete sets of the prints.
