= Lovett (surname) =

Lovett is an English surname. Notable people with the surname include:

== People ==
=== Academics ===
- Clara Lovett, Italian-born American former president of Northern Arizona University
- Edgar Odell Lovett (1871–1957), American mathematics professor and first president of Rice Institute (now Rice University)

=== Actors and musicians ===
- Ben Lovett (born 1978), American musician and film composer
- Ben Lovett (British musician) (born 1986), British musician and member of Mumford & Sons
- Lyle Lovett (born 1957), American singer-songwriter and actor
- Martin Lovett (1927–2020), English cellist
- Norman Lovett (born 1946), English stand-up comedian and actor
- Ruby Lovett (born 1967), American country music singer

=== Political figures ===
- Lewis Johnstone Lovett (1867–1942), member of the Canadian House of Commons
- Phineas Lovett (1745–1828), farmer, merchant, judge and political figure in Nova Scotia, Canada

=== Sportspeople ===
- Andrew Lovett (born 1982), Australian rules footballer
- Claire Lovett (1910–2005), Canadian badminton and tennis player
- Dominic Lovett (born 2002), American football player
- Fabien Lovett (born 1999), American football player
- Frances Lovett (fl. 1946), All-American Girls Professional Baseball League player
- James Lovett (born 1986), American professional surfer, skimboarder and wakeboarder
- Jay Lovett (born 1978), English footballer
- Mem Lovett (1912–1995), American baseball player
- Nathan Lovett-Murray (born 1982), Australian rules footballer
- Tom Lovett (1863–1928), American baseball pitcher

=== Other ===
- Ann Lovett (1968–1984), Irish schoolgirl who died while giving birth
- Bill Lovett (1894–1923), Irish-American gangster
- John Lovett (disambiguation), multiple people
- Linda Lovett, Indigenous Australian barrister
- Neville Lovett (1869–1951), English bishop
- Richard Lovett (disambiguation), multiple people
- Robert Lovett (disambiguation), multiple people
- William Lovett (1800–1877), British activist

== Fictional characters ==
- Mrs. Lovett, character in Sweeney Todd
- Ethan Lovett, character on the soap opera General Hospital
- Brock Lovett, treasure hunter in the 1997 film Titanic
