= Dovedale by Moonlight =

Painting by Joseph Wright of Derby

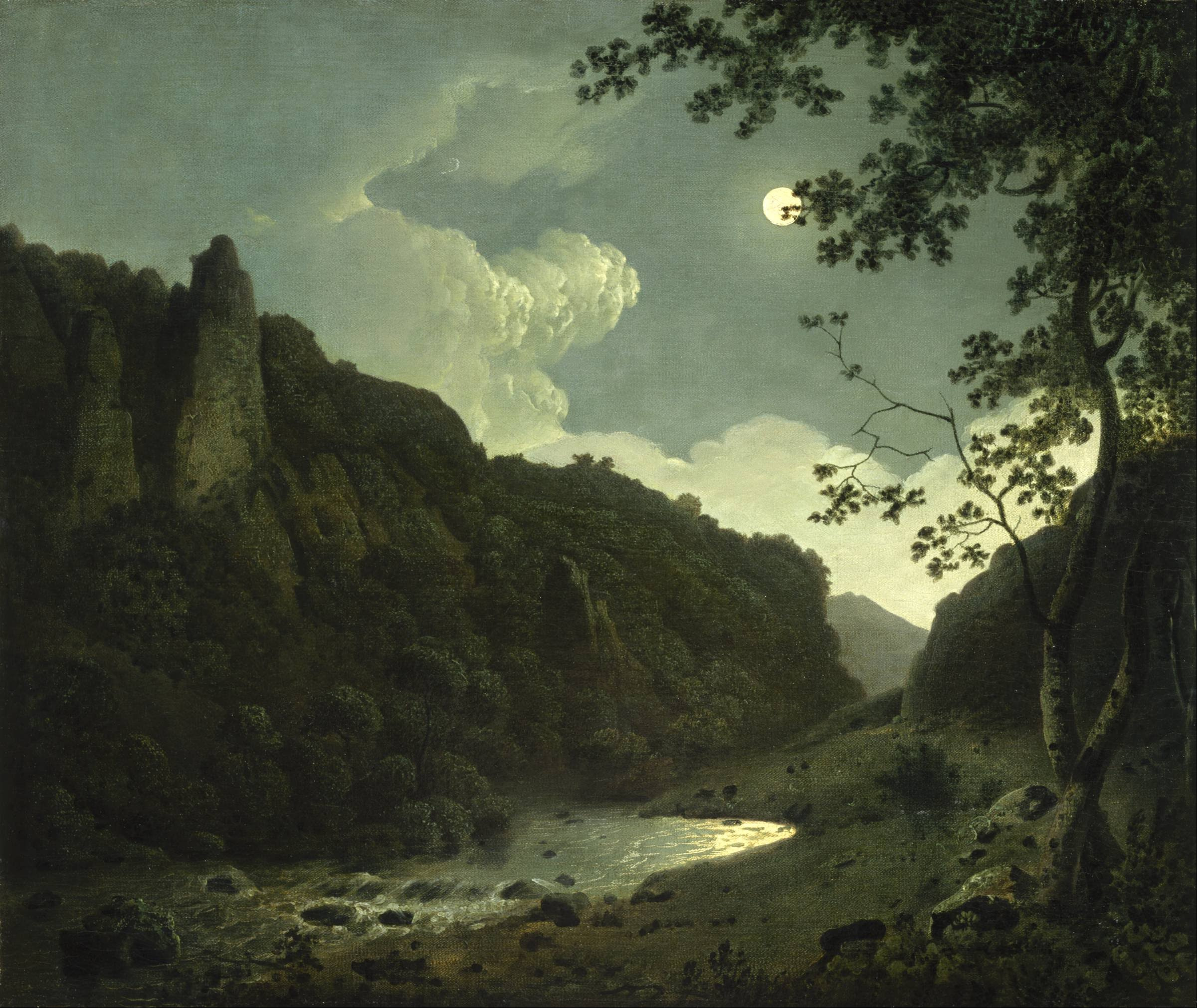
- Artist: Joseph Wright of Derby
- Year: 1784
- Dimensions: 62.5 cm × 77.8 cm (24.6 in × 30.6 in)
- Location: Allen Memorial Art Museum, Oberlin College; Ohio

Dovedale by Moonlight, 1784, is one of five paintings by Joseph Wright of Derby which uses the picturesque valley of Dovedale as its subject. These paintings were sometimes made as pairs with one showing the view by day and the other by moonlight. Wright admitted that he had not observed this scene directly, "Moon lights & fire lights are but a sort of work with me for I cant with impunity go out at night and study the former, & the latter I have seen but once, and at a time too, when I thought not of painting such effects."

== Description ==
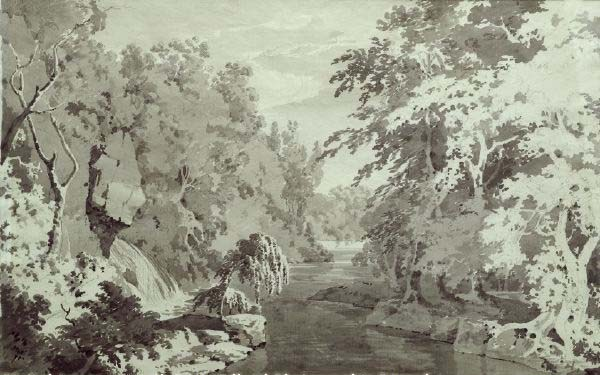
A preparatory sketch for these paintings (now in Derby Museum and Art Gallery). The unusual trees are said to be after Alexander Cozens.

Dovedale is a very popular dale in Staffordshire and Wright's home county of Derbyshire. Admired in Wright's time, it has been owned by the National Trust since 1924 and made available to the many Peak District visitors. Dovedale is named for the River Dove and it is 3 miles (5 km) long.

Wright's paintings appear to be from nature, but in a letter of 1787 he said that he had observed moonlight and firelight only once at night and this was some time before he decided to create this series of paintings. However his preparatory sketches show that he was using a mixture of studies and chance. The unusual reversal of light and shade in the trees in the sketch of Dovedale is said to be after using techniques created by the Russian born Alexander Cozens. Wright owned paintings by Cozens who taught his students to paint landscapes. He told them to create blots on paper and then use these as inspiration for the composition.

== History ==
There are no known Derbyshire landscapes by Wright that are dateable before 1786. One of the problems is that many of Wright's paintings are dated by consulting Wright's accounts in his notebook. In the case of his English landscapes this has proved challenging. It is known that some of the Dovedale pictures are some of his earliest English landscapes. Wright frequently repeated a popular subject in his paintings as he did with his Virgil's Tomb pictures and his Blacksmith's Shop paintings. In this case he made five very similar paintings. The version at Oberlin College was painted in 1785 to 1786 and sold to Edward Mundy of Shipley Hall. The college obtained it in 1951. There is a matching painting to this which is a similar view but in daylight. That painting is still in Derbyshire at Parwich Hall which is in a small village close to Dovedale. Wright also did a daylight view of Dovedale in 1787 which he gave to the industrialist Josiah Wedgwood out of respect for his patronage on the arts. This painting is now in the Wedgwood Museum. Two other paintings of Dovedale were sold to Sir Brooke Boothby, 6th Baronet of Ashbourne Hall, who had helped Wright when he put on the first one-man exhibition in London. Boothby also purchased two views of nearby Matlock, two paintings of bridges in Rome as well as an unusual 1781 portrait of himself lying by a brook holding a book by Rousseau.
