= Peter Perez Burdett and His First Wife Hannah =

Painting by Joseph Wright of Derby

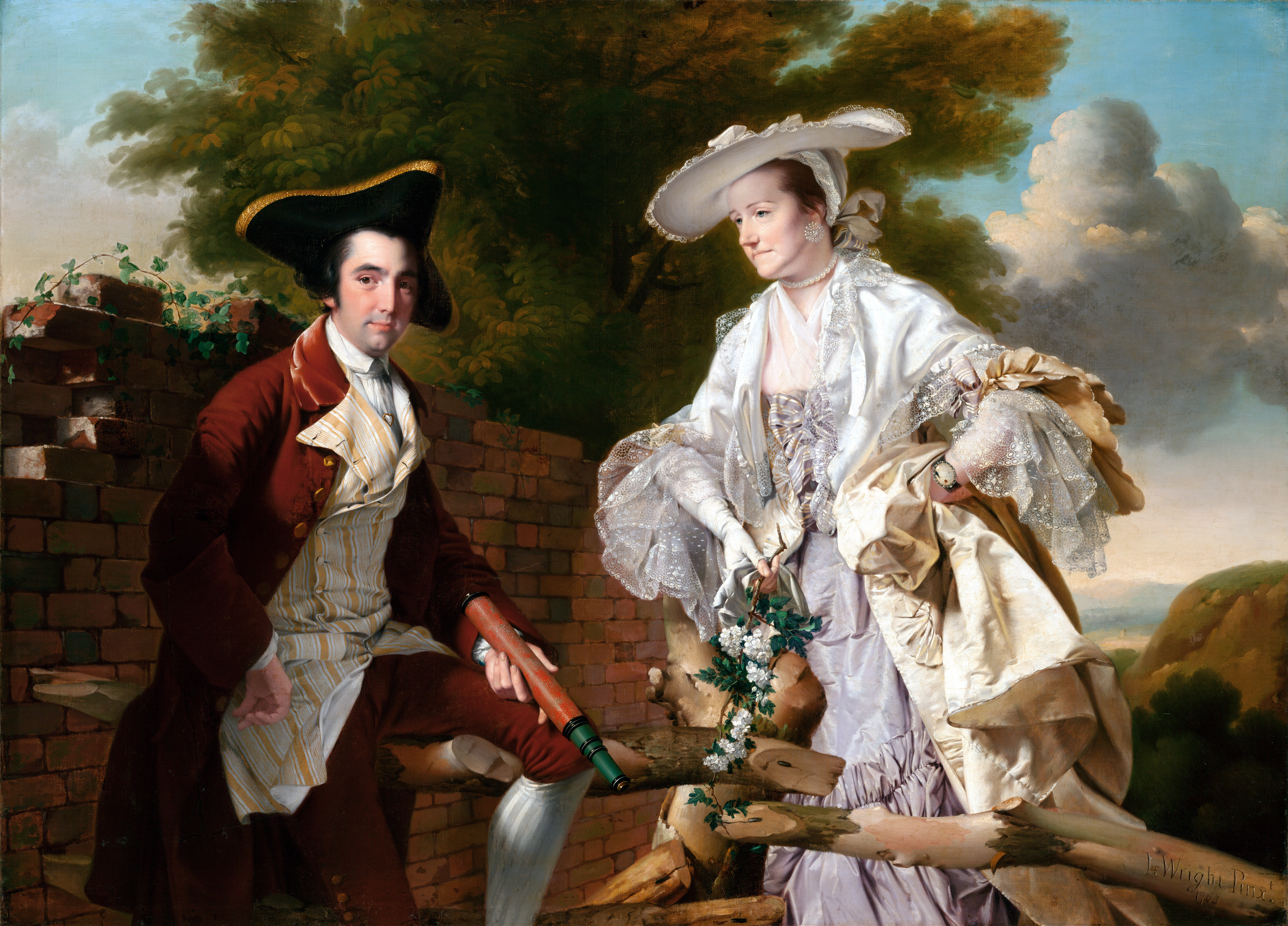
- Artist: Joseph Wright of Derby
- Year: 1765
- Type: Oil on canvas, portrait painting
- Dimensions: 145 cm × 205 cm (57 in × 81 in)
- Location: National Gallery Prague; Prague

Peter Perez Burdett and His First Wife Hannah is a 1765 portrait painting by the British artist Joseph Wright of Derby. It features a dual portrait of the cartographer Peter Perez Burdett and his first wife Hannah Wansell. The fact that the widowed Hannah was considerably wealthier than him, and her money allowed him to work on his map of Derbyshire, is reflected in their contrasting styles of dress and positioning. Burdett was a friend of Wright and is shown in several of his paintings including A Philosopher Lecturing on the Orrery. The work was likely to have been exhibited at the Exhibition of 1765 held by the Society of Artists in London. Today the painting is in the National Gallery of the Czech capital Prague.

== Bibliography ==
- Egerton, Judy. Wright of Derby. Tate Gallery, 1990.
- Leach, Stephen. The Adventures and Speculations of the Ingenious Peter Perez Burdett. Cambridge Scholars Publishing, 2022.
