= Vesuvius from Posillipo by Moonlight =

Painting by Joseph Wright of Derby

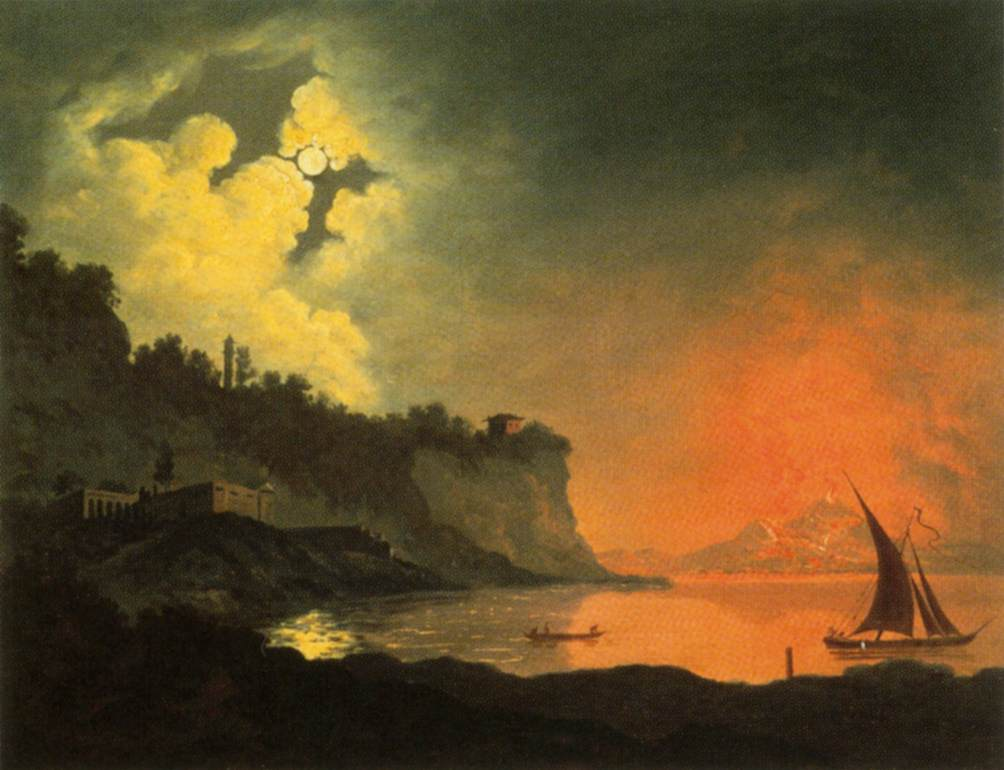
- Artist: Joseph Wright of Derby
- Year: 1774
- Medium: Oil on canvas
- Location: Yale Center for British Art; New Haven

Vesuvius from Posillipo by Moonlight was painted by Joseph Wright of Derby in 1774. It is an oil painting of Mount Vesuvius in the distance, from the coastal shores of Naples at night. Dark grey smoke spews from the glowing red crater of the volcano and fills up the top right of the canvas, in contrast to the pale glow of moonlight to the left. Known as a "Painter of Light," Wright liked to play with highlights and shadows in his works and was most well known for his "Candlelight Pictures," landscape or genre scenes depicting dramatic contrasts between light and dark. Through utilizing this technique, Joseph Wright exhibits the sublimity of nature in Vesuvius from Posillipo by Moonlight as well as his other paintings of Mt. Vesuvius.

Wright made a trip to Italy in 1773, where he acquired a wealth of new sights and experiences which greatly influenced his art. He drew and wrote extensively about ancient Roman and Italian art and architecture, and Italian landscapes and coastal scenes, especially around Naples. His imagination was particularly captivated by the volcanic activities of Mount Vesuvius, from which he derived many sketches of its textures and painted over 30 versions of it upon his return to England. Wright described his impression of Vesuvius as, "the most wonderful sight in nature." Although he did not personally witness an eruption, Wright still observed the volcano in a restrained state of activity, as it fumed smoke and spilled lava—and later expanded on and pieced together what he saw in his future paintings of the volcano.

Vesuvius from Posillipo by Moonlight was painted in Europe during the Neoclassical period. In response to the discovery of the ancient Roman cities, the king of Naples appeared to have encouraged the exploration of Mt. Vesuvius, Pompeii, Herculaneum, and the Bay of Naples. This likely lead numerous artists, such as Wright himself, to go to Italy and become inspired by the sublimity of Mt. Vesuvius. Occurring at the same time was the Enlightenment movement, towards which Wright contributed his more popular scientifically and industrially themed works, especially his two most famous pieces: A Philosopher Lecturing on the Orrery and An Experiment on a Bird in the Air Pump. These typically displayed scientific demonstrations in a dimly lit room, suggesting the idea that society should revolve around education. Even though Vesuvius from Posillipo by Moonlight is not of a directly historical or scientific theme, Wright may have painted Mt. Vesuvius because he felt that it was an important part of history to preserve and be aware of, in addition to his fascination by its nature. Today, is evident that the 79 A.D. eruption of Mt. Vesuvius was indeed a major catastrophic event, because two cities with great archaeological artifacts of ancient Rome lie beneath its volcanic ashes.
