= Richard Lovett =

Richard Lovett may refer to:

- Richard Lovett (Seigneur), Seigneur of Upper Normandy
- Richard Lovett (writer) (1851–1904), English Methodist minister and author
- Richard A. Lovett (born 1953), science fiction author
- Richard Lovett (scientist) (1692–1780), English amateur scientist
