= Self-Portrait (Wright of Derby) =

Painting by Joseph Wright of Derby

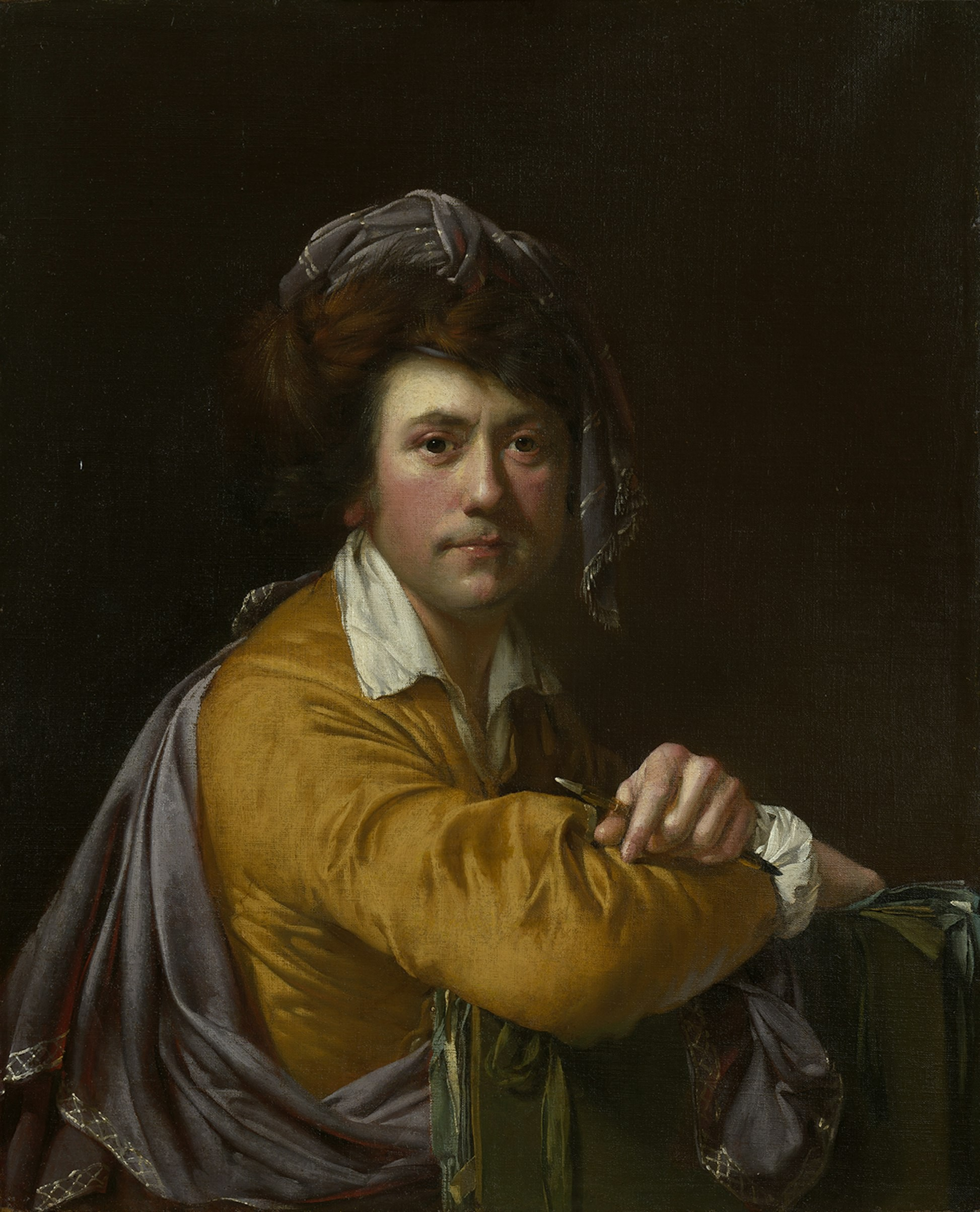
- Artist: Joseph Wright of Derby
- Year: c.1772
- Type: Oil on canvas, portrait painting
- Dimensions: 76 cm × 64 cm (30 in × 25 in)
- Location: Derby Museum and Art Gallery; Derby

Self-Portrait is a c.1772 portrait painting by the British artist Joseph Wright of Derby. A self-portrait, it is distinctive in showing Wright in his role as a painter, holding a porte-crayon and leaning on a portfolio. At the time he had become well known for his chiaroscuro paintings of candlelit scenes. In producing the self-portrait, he reused the reverse side of a piece of canvas on which he had earlier made a preparatory oil sketch for An Experiment on a Bird in the Air Pump.

In 2022 the painting was acquired by the nation, partly through acceptance in lieu as well as donations from the Art Fund and others and assigned to the Derby Museum and Art Gallery which has the largest collection of works by the artist in the world.

== Bibliography ==
- Bamford, Lucy & Wallis, Jonathan. Joseph Wright of Derby. Derby Museums, 2017.
- Egerton, Judy. Wright of Derby. Tate Gallery, 1990.
- Leach, Stephen H. Joseph Wright and the Final Farewell. Cambridge Scholars Publishing, 2022.
