= William Tate (painter) =

English painter (1747–1806)

- Born: 1747; Barnsley
- Died: 2 June 1806 (aged 58–59); Bath

William Tate (1747 – 2 June 1806) was an English portrait painter who was a pupil and friend of Joseph Wright of Derby.

== Life ==
Tate was born in 1747 at Gawber Hall, near Barnsley, where his father was a glass maker and was christened on 14 November in Darton near Barnsley He was educated at Woolton near Liverpool where his brother Richard Tate lived. Richard Tate had Joseph Wright of Derby as his lodger in 1769-1772. Richard was an amateur painter and was well connected. William Tate became Wright's pupil.

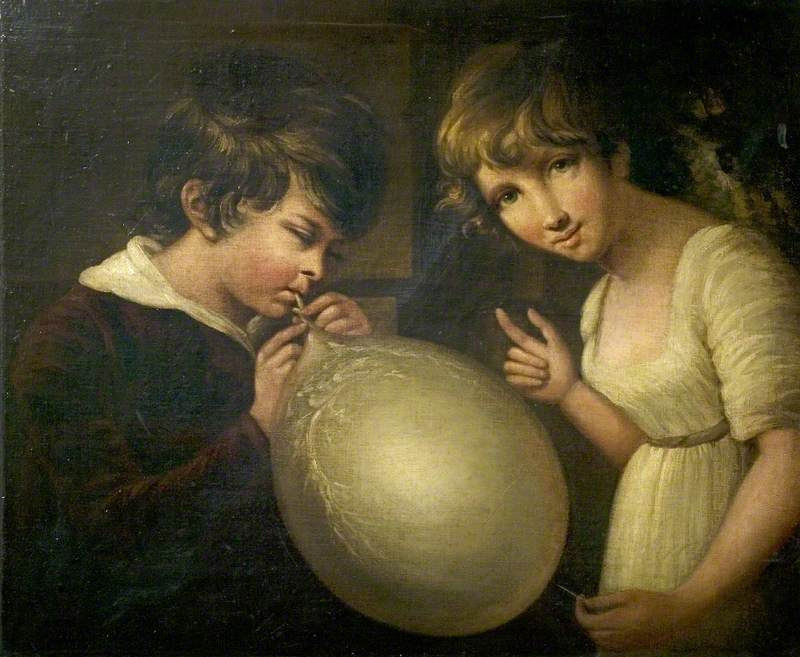
Girl and Boy with a Bladder by William Tate

It was with Joseph Wright in 1772 that William Tate first exhibited at the Society of Artists in London where he became a fellow. Over the next twenty years Tate exhibited in Manchester (1773), Liverpool (1774–1787) and London (1778–1787) at the Royal Academy of Art. Both Tate and Joseph Wright quarrelled with the Academy of Art which cannot have assisted Tate's career. In Liverpool however he enjoyed good support and in 1784 his work was exhibited in Liverpool with the same prominence as Joshua Reynolds. In 1787 William Tate moved to Manchester where he enjoyed a number of good commissions for portraits. Daniel Daulby had himself and both of his wives painted by Tate. He moved south to Bath in 1804 where he died in 1806.

The Walker Art Gallery has a number of William Tate's portraits of notable men and women of the day including Daniel Daulby, and the sister of William Roscoe. There are also paintings of his nephew Thomas Moss Tate and his niece Elizabeth Williamson, wife of Joseph Williamson. There are thirteen paintings in national collections in the UK including a portrait of Joseph Wright and Girl and Boy with a Bladder at Derby Museum and Art Gallery which also hosts the country's main collection of Joseph Wright paintings.
