= Moonlight, Coast of Tuscany =

Painting by Joseph Wright of Derby

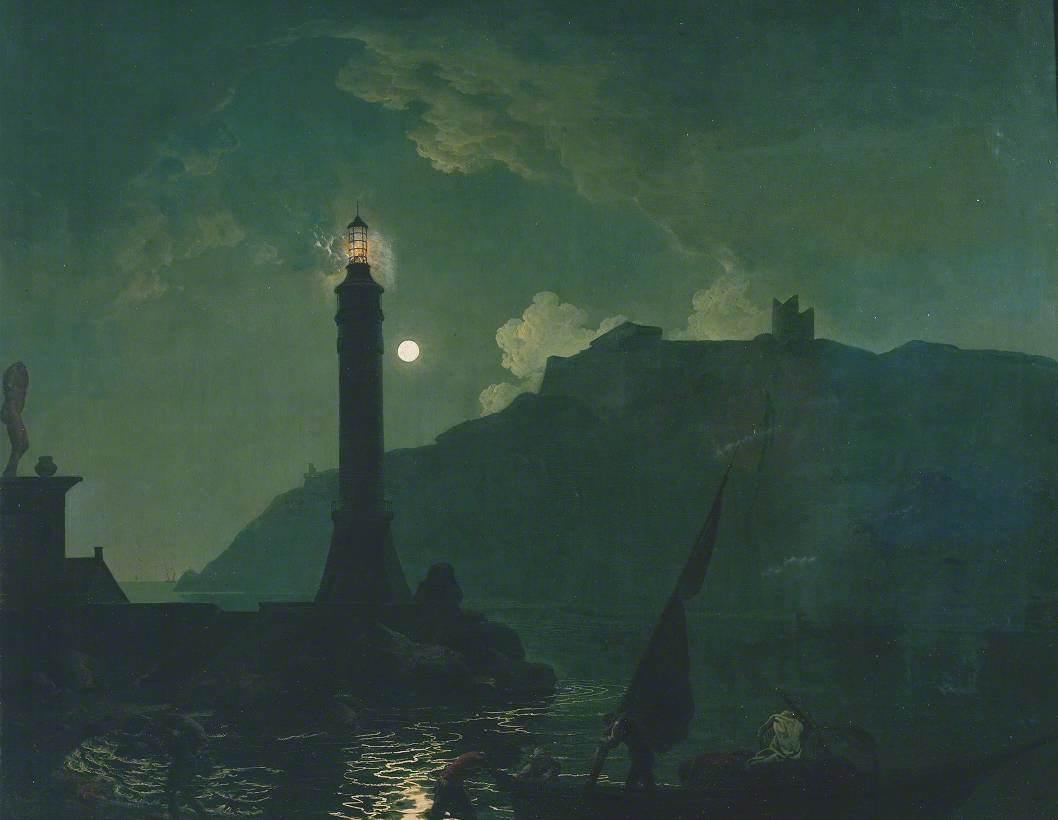
- Artist: Joseph Wright of Derby
- Year: 1790
- Type: Oil on canvas, landscape painting
- Dimensions: 101.6 cm × 127.6 cm (40.0 in × 50.2 in)
- Location: Tate Britain, London

Moonlight, Coast of Tuscany is a 1790 landscape painting by the British artist Joseph Wright of Derby. It features a lighthouse and cliffs on the coast of Tuscany. Wright had visited Italy a number of years before, although was likely an imagined scene inspired by his trip. Wright, known for his chiaroscuro effects, contrasts the natural light of the Moon with the artificial luminosity of the lighthouse. The composition gives a sense of melodrama.

Such atmospheric moonlight scenes were a common feature of the early Romantic era, featuring in works by artists such as Joseph Vernet and Loutherbourg. J.M.W. Turner also produced a notable early painting Moonlight, a Study at Millbank in 1797 that was similar in style.

The work featured at the Royal Academy Exhibition of 1790 at Somerset House. Today the painting is in the collection of the Tate Britain gallery in London, having been acquired in 1949.

== Bibliography ==
- Paulson, Ronald. Emblem and Expression: Meaning in English Art of the Eighteenth Century. Harvard University Press, 1975.
- Spencer-Longhurst, Paul. The Sun Rising Through Vapour: Turner's Early Seascapes. Third Millennium Information, 2003.
