= Portrait of Jedediah Strutt =

Painting by Joseph Wright of Derby

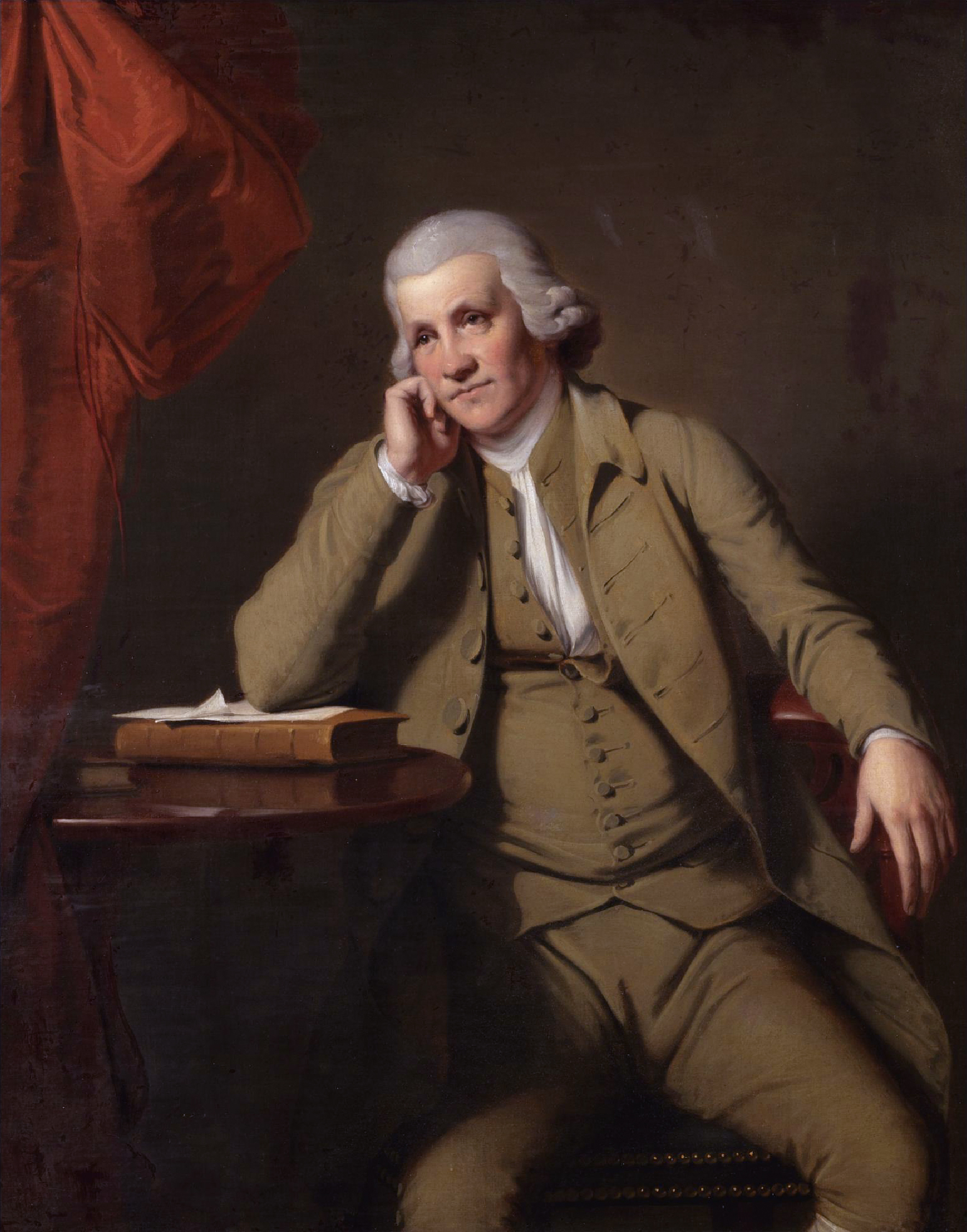
- Artist: Joseph Wright of Derby
- Year: 1790
- Type: Oil on canvas, portrait painting
- Dimensions: 125 cm × 99 cm (49 in × 39 in)
- Location: Derby Museum and Art Gallery; Derby

Portrait of Jedediah Strutt is a 1790 portrait painting by the British artist Joseph Wright of Derby. It depicts the English manufacturer of clothes and cotton spinner Jedediah Strutt. It was produced the same year as another large painting by Wright of a self-made Derby industrialist Richard Arkwright, a former business partner of Strutt .However, Strutt chose to be depicted with books rather than as an industrialist.

Today the painting is in the collection of the Derby Museum and Art Gallery, having been acquired in 1976.

== Bibliography ==
- Bamford, Lucy & Wallis, Jonathan. Joseph Wright of Derby. Derby Museums, 2017.
- Leach, Stephen H. Joseph Wright and the Final Farewell. Cambridge Scholars Publishing, 2022.
