= Richard Lovett (scientist) =

English scientist and lay clerk of Worcester Cathedral

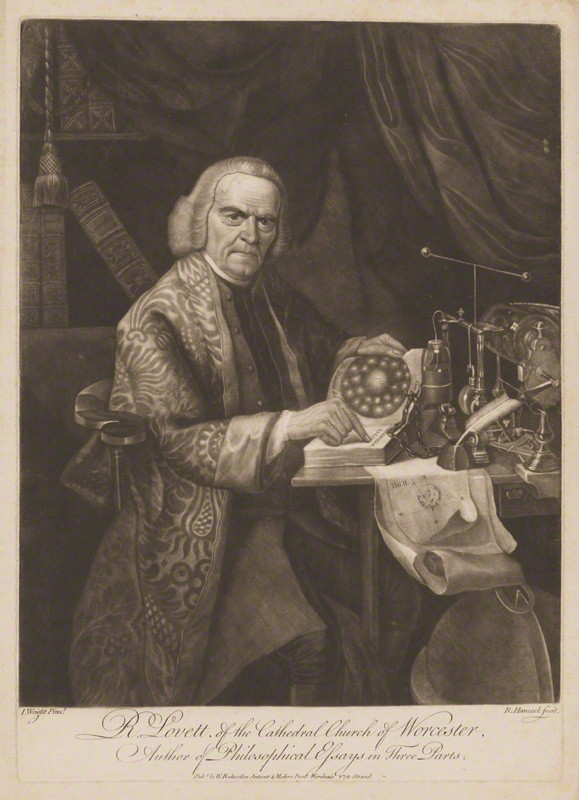
Richard Lovett's portrait by Robert Hancock, published by William Richardson, after Joseph Wright. Mezzotint, late eighteenth century.

Richard Lovett (1692–1780) was an English amateur scientist and lay clerk of Worcester Cathedral.

Lovett was mainly known as a pioneer in the electric shock therapy. His results from experiments around 1755, were recorded in The Subtil Medium Prov'd (1756), which was the first English textbook on medical electricity, and The Electrical Philosopher (1774). He claimed to be able to treat not only mental diseases, but also other ails as sore throats by electricity. Lovett's theory of electricity was to a large extent based on the theories of Isaac Newton.
