= Three Children of Richard Arkwright with a Goat =

Painting by Joseph Wright of Derby

- Artist: Joseph Wright of Derby
- Year: 1791
- Type: Oil on canvas, portrait painting
- Dimensions: 190.5 cm × 149.9 cm (75.0 in × 59.0 in)
- Location: Tate Britain; London

Three Children of Richard Arkwright with a goat is a 1791 portrait painting by the British artist Joseph Wright of Derby. It depicts three of the children of Richard Arkwright junior posing with a goat. They were the grandchildren of the leading industrialist Richard Arkwright and was part of a series of paintings commissioned to depict the family. A companion piece was produced with their three elder brothers posing with a kite. In a private collection todau, it has been on a long-term loan to the Tate Britain in Pimlico since 2007.

== Bibliography ==
- Burke, Joseph. The Iconography of the Enlightenment in English Art. Sydney University Press, 1970.
- Fitton, R.S. The Arkwrights: Spinners of Fortune. Manchester University Press, 1989.
