= Alexander Cozens =

English painter

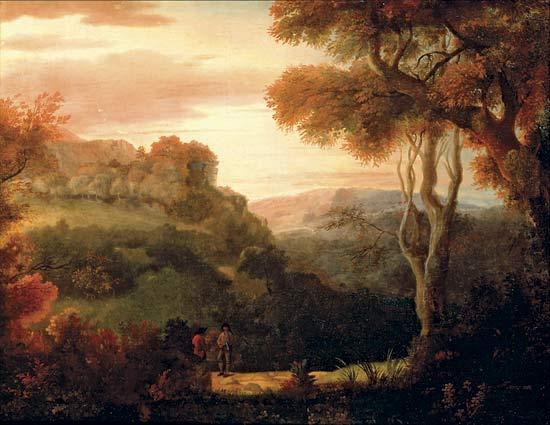
Vale near Matlock

Alexander Cozens (1717 – 23 April 1786) was a British landscape painter in watercolours, born in Saint Petersburg, Russia. He taught drawing and wrote treatises on the subject, evolving a method in which imaginative drawings of landscapes could be worked up from abstract blots on paper. His son was John Robert Cozens, regarded as one of the greatest of English watercolourists.

Although in his lifetime Alexander Cozens was famous, and slightly notorious as "the Blotmaster to the town", he was not very highly regarded in the 19th century, until interest in him and his writings revived in the 1920s. Partly for reasons emerging from the theoretical approach of the time, his paintings have very little variation of colour, being mainly concerned with massing of his forms.

== Life ==
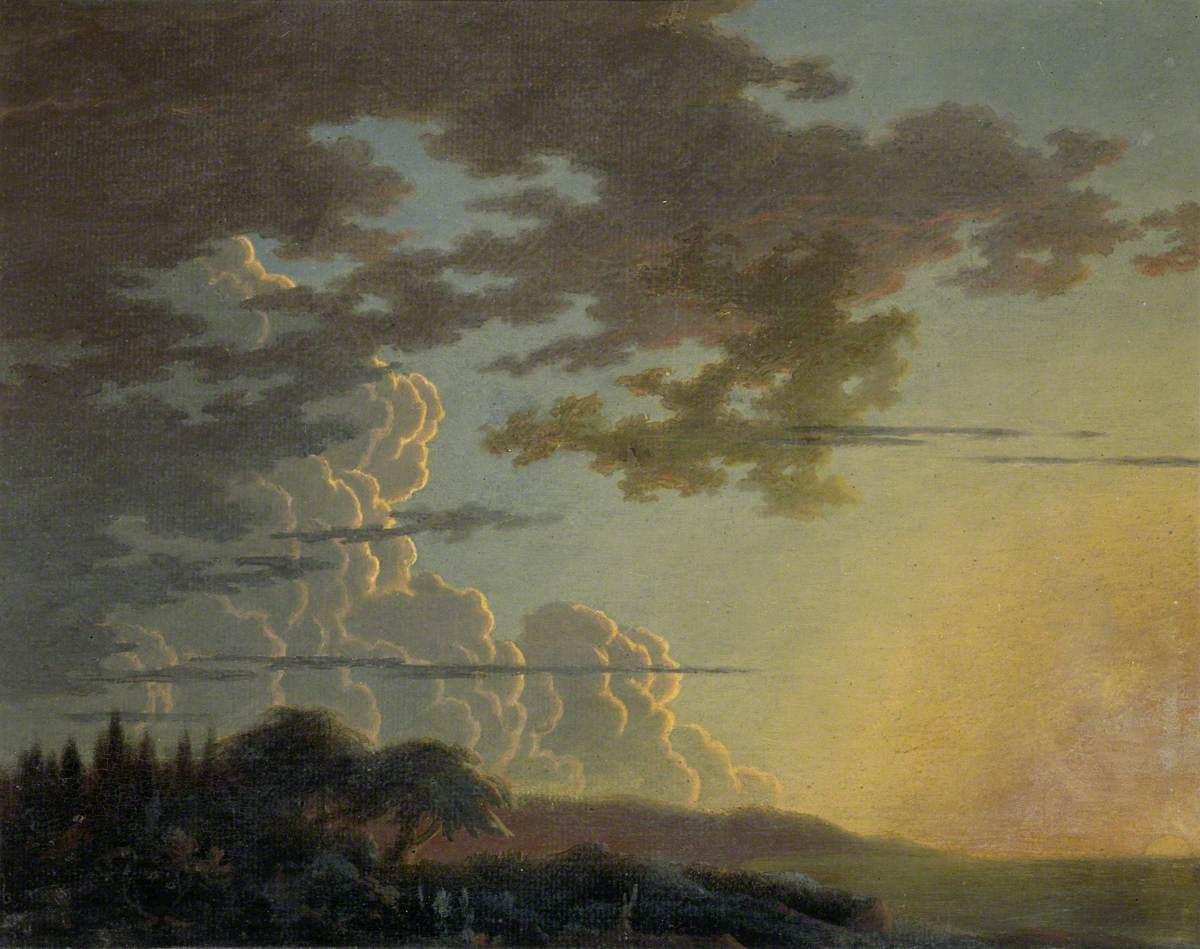
Setting Sun, oils, 1770–73

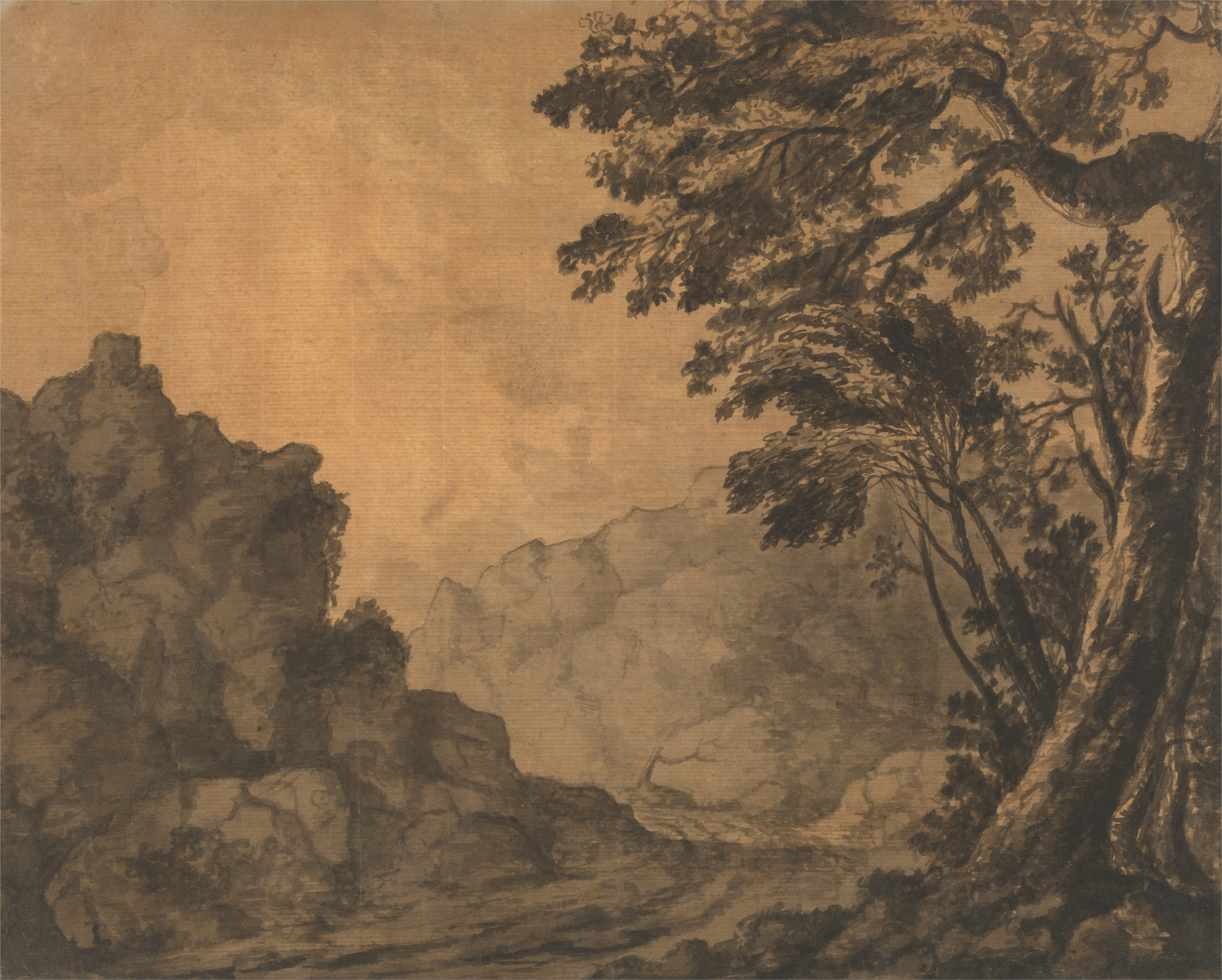
Landscape in ink and wash, c. 1780

Alexander Cozens was born in Saint Petersburg, Russia. Widely mistaken to be a natural son of Emperor Peter I of Russia and a British woman, Mary Davenport, from Deptford, he was, in fact, the son of Richard Cozens (1674–1735), who worked for Peter I as a shipbuilder. The emperor was the godfather of Alexander.

He was educated in England from 1727, but later returned to Russia. In 1746 he sailed from Saint Petersburg to Italy, where he spent two years before travelling onward to England. While in Rome, he worked in the studio of the French landscape painter, Claude-Joseph Vernet.

Between 1750 and 1754, Cozens was drawing-master at Christ's Hospital, and in the same decade also began to take private pupils. In 1751, he was nominated to serve as Rouge Croix Pursuivant at the College of Arms but never received his Letters Patent enabling him to take up the office.

From 1763 to 1768 he was drawing-master at Eton College. He gave lessons to the Prince of Wales, Sir George Beaumont, and William Beckford, arguably the three most important British art patrons and collectors of their generation. Beckford continued to correspond with him for some years. He also practised at Bath, Somerset.

In 1760, he was among the contributors to the first public exhibition in London of works by living artists, held in the great room of the Society of Arts. The exhibition was organised by a body of artists who afterward divided into the "Free Society" and the "Incorporated Society of Artists". Cozens contributed to the exhibitions of both societies. In 1761 he obtained a prize from the Society of Arts at the exhibition in the Strand of the former, but he was one of the original members of the latter, incorporated in 1766. He also exhibited eight works at the Royal Academy between 1772 and 1781.

He married Charlotte Pine, the daughter of John Pine, engraver, print-shop owner, friend of William Hogarth, and Bluemantle Pursuivant in the College of Heralds. They left one son, John Robert Cozens, and a daughter, Juliet Ann Cozens (later Roberts). Alexander Cozens died in Duke Street, Piccadilly, London, on 23 April 1786.

== Work ==
The style used by Cozens before he finally settled in Britain may be seen in a collection of fifty-four early drawings, mostly Italian scenes, in the British Museum. Cozens lost them in Germany on his way from Rome to Britain, and they were only recovered by his son in Florence in 1776. They show him as a highly skilled draughtsman in the style of the time, with a feeling for elegant composition. Some are wholly in pen and ink in the manner of line engravings. Others show extensive landscapes, elaborately drawn in pencil, and partly finished in ink. Others are washed in monochrome, and some in colour of a timid kind. In most there is little sky, but in one he has attempted a bold effect of sunlight streaming through cloud, and brightly illuminating several distinct spots in the landscape. There are several broad pencil drawings on greenish paper heightened with white. Altogether these show that by this time Cozens was a well-trained artist who observed nature and was not without poetical feeling. After his arrival in Britain he appears, from some drawings in the Victoria and Albert Museum, to have adopted a much broader style, aiming at an imposing distribution of masses and large effects of light and shade.

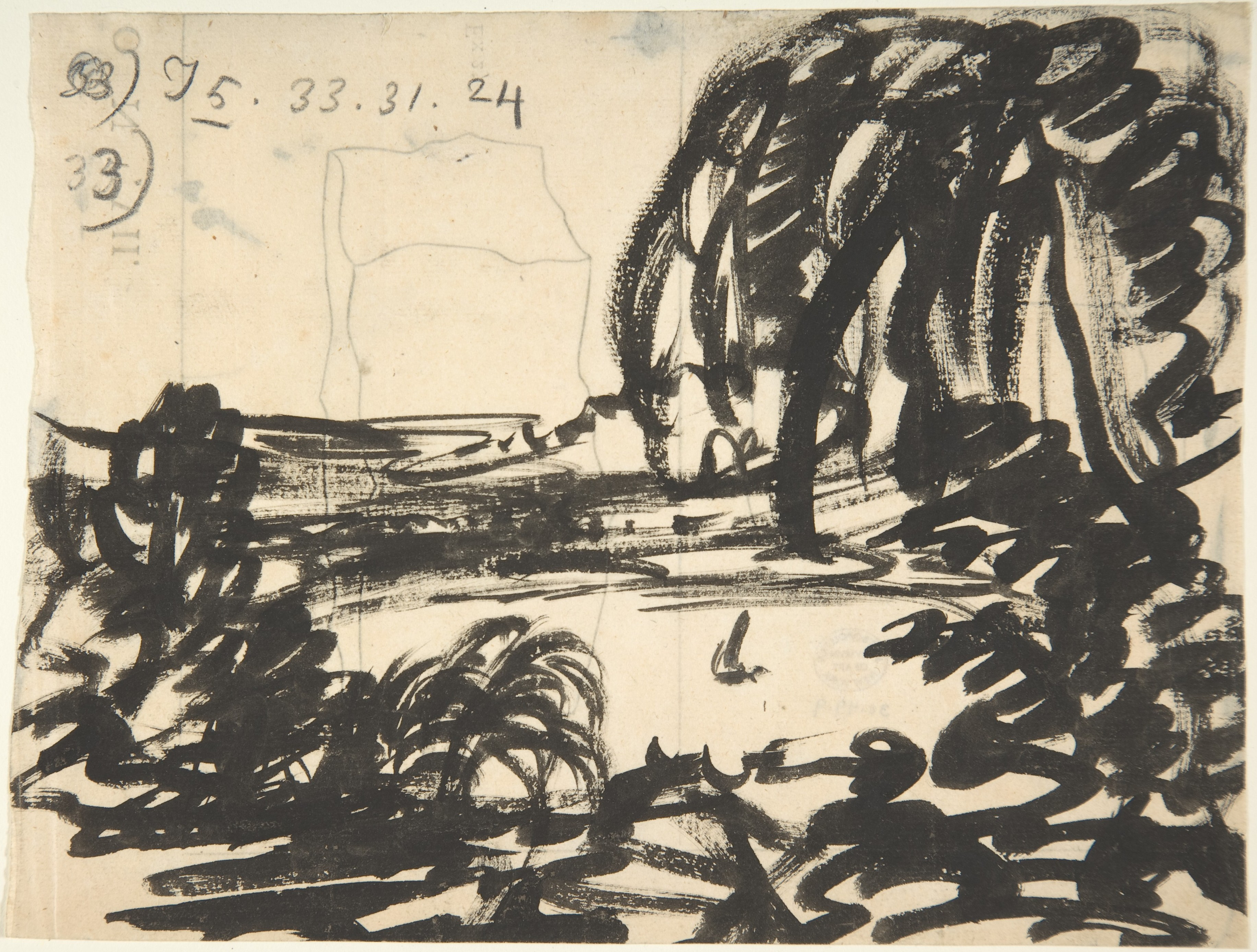
A Blot-Lake with Boat, Surrounded by Trees, MET

Henry Angelo, who (like Sir George Beaumont) was his pupil at Eton, described Cozens's unusual method of teaching in his Reminiscences:

Cozens dashed out upon several pieces of paper, a series of accidental smudges and blots, in black, brown, and gray, which being floated on, he impressed again upon other paper, and, by the exercise of his fertile imagination, and a certain degree of ingenious coaxing, converted into romantic rocks, woods, towers, steeples, cottages, rivers, fields, and waterfalls. Blue and gray blots, formed the mountains, clouds, and skies.... An improvement was incorporated on these first principles, I recollect, which was in splashing the bottoms of earthen-plates with these blots, and to stamp impressions therefrom on sheets of damped paper.

In 1785 Cozens published a pamphlet on this manner of drawing landscapes from blots, called A New Method of Assisting the Invention in Drawing Original Compositions of Landscape. Cozens defined a blot as "a production of chance with a small degree of design" and acknowledged the influence on his ideas of a passage in Leonardo da Vinci's Treatise on Painting, which recommends that artists should look for inspiration in stains or marks on old walls. Joseph Wright of Derby was influenced by Cozens, owned paintings by him, and used his ideas as inspiration for his compositions. He also described the technique Cozens recommended for creation from blots.

In 1778 Cozens published Principles of Beauty relative to the Human Head (a work "of more ingenuity than value"), with nineteen engravings by Francesco Bartolozzi. The list of subscribers included William Beckford (father of Cozens's pupil William Thomas Beckford), Burke, Garrick, Flaxman, Sir Joshua Reynolds, and other men of culture. In 1782 Thomas Banks exhibited his Head of a Majestic Beauty, composed on Mr.Cozens's principles. Cozens also published The Various Species of Composition in Nature, and The Shape, Skeleton, and Foliage of Thirty-two Species of Trees (1771, reprinted 1786).
