= John Lovett =

John Lovett may refer to:

- John Lovett (American politician) (1761–1818), U.S. Representative from New York
- John Lovett (American football coach) (born 1950)
- John Lovett (tight end) (born 1996), American football player
- John Lovett (baseball) (1877–1937), American baseball player
- John M. Lovett (1943–2003), Australian government administrator
- John Lovett (runner), winner of the 1970 distance medley relay at the NCAA Division I Indoor Track and Field Championships

== See also ==
- Jon Lovett (born 1982), American speechwriter and media personality
- Jon Lovitz (born 1957), American comedic actor
- John Lovitt (1832–1908), Canadian politician, shipbuilder, and captain
