= Three Persons Viewing the Gladiator by Candlelight =

Painting by Joseph Wright of Derby

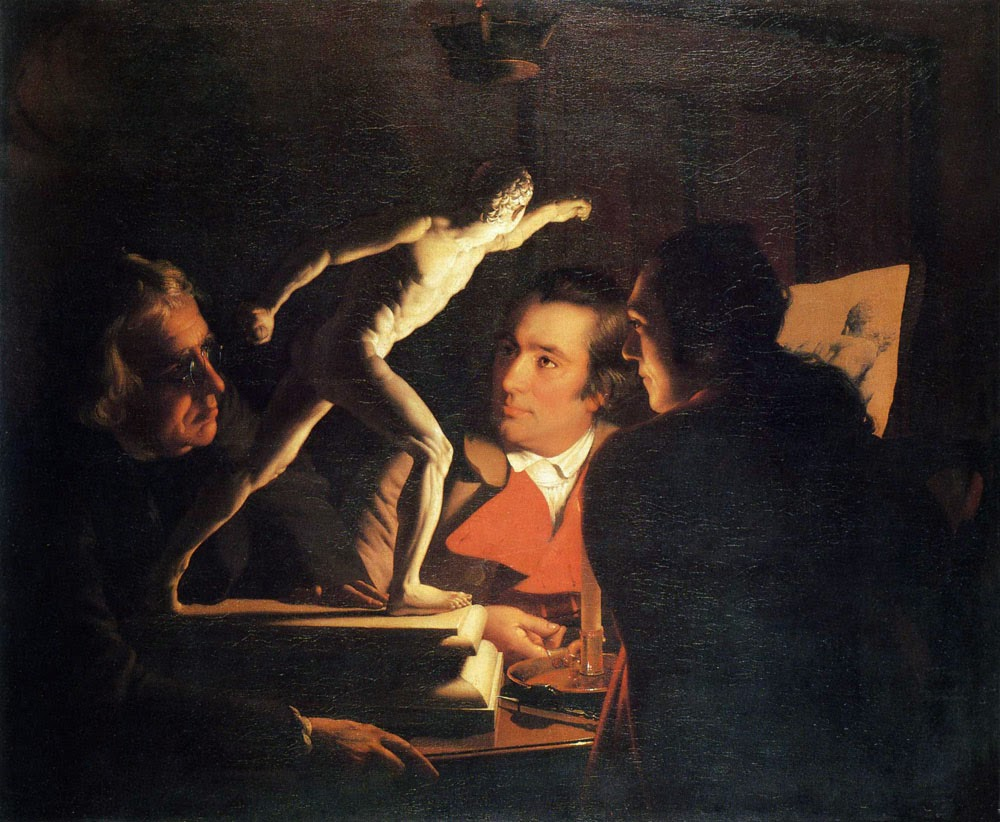
Three Persons Viewing the Gladiator by Candlelight by Joseph Wright of Derby (1765; Walker Art Gallery, Liverpool).

Three Persons Viewing the Gladiator by Candlelight is a 1765 painting by Joseph Wright of Derby and now resides in the Walker Art Gallery in Liverpool, in the United Kingdom. It depicts three men examining a reproduction of the Borghese Gladiator, a famous Hellenistic statue discovered in Italy. The painting was one of the first in Wright of Derby's "Candlelight Pictures" series and was originally exhibited in London, gaining much attention. Four years later a mezzotint of it was made by William Pether.

== Composition ==
With only a candle as a light source, much of the painting is made up of black shadows. Many of the forms fade into the darkness, leaving them with vague or nonexistent borders. A black expanse of negative space and a small lantern hanging from the ceiling suggests the existence of a room. The warm colors of the flame provide a stark contrast against the dark shadows of the space. Wright's use of tenebrism creates a sense of drama and life within the image. This use of tenebrism is comparable to the works of the old masters, reinforcing an Enlightenment idea of building off of the past while modernizing the present. High contrasts of light and shadow illuminate and deepen the objects, textures, and features of those within the room. Despite the high contrast in this painting, no part of the work feels rigid or abrupt. The glow of the candle gives everything within its light a smooth feeling. The light shines gently on the onlookers, highlighting soft, wispy hair, smooth skin, and the soft stone of the Gladiator reproduction.

Wright's use of light, color, and line aid in drawing the viewer's eyes to the center of the work. The eye is immediately drawn to the pop of red color on the center figure's lapels. The candlelight causes the lapels to cast deep shadows, which in turn create well-defined diagonal lines that carry the viewer's eyes upwards to the man's face. The man's cheeks and lips have a rosy hue, emulating the red of his lapels and creating a sense of unity within the figure. The viewer can follow the man's focused eyes to the figure of the Gladiator. The neck and chest of the reproduction are well lit, reflecting bright white light that pulls the attention to its body. The chiseled lines of the Gladiator's figure are emphasized using shadows. These elements create a clear focal point in the center of the work: the interaction between the statue and the man who is intently studying it.

Upon inspection, it becomes clear that the viewer does not actually have the best view of this scene. The viewer is not studying the gladiator like the subjects are doing, as the perspective that the viewer is seeing does not show much of the illuminated side of the gladiator. Instead, the viewer is intended to see all of the figures. Likewise, the elderly man on the left does not have a very good viewpoint of the Gladiator. It is clear that he is the educator in this scene, with his two pupils observing and sketching the model. Wright organized the figures in a balanced way – the figures in shadow are on either side of the canvas while the well-lit figures fall in the center. The unity and balance of this painting create a sense of calmness. The subjects are focused and at ease while learning in the warm and peaceful setting that Wright has created.

== Joseph Wright of Derby and the Enlightenment ==
In the mid-1700s, London began to experience a shift in attitude, knowledge, and beliefs known as The Enlightenment. People were liberated from stringent political regimes, superstition due to the lack of knowledge, and a feeling of social exclusion based on class. Standards for artists changed as well. During this time period, The academy had a tendency to favor works that referenced religion or classical stories and figures.

Throughout the course of his life, Joseph Wright of Derby made it a point to interact with people of all forms of a new, Enlightenment-Era class known as Polite Society. His circle of contacts consisted of architects, painters, scientists, philosophers, Lunar Society members, Freemasons, and many others. This background allowed him to incorporate Enlightenment ideas into his artwork.

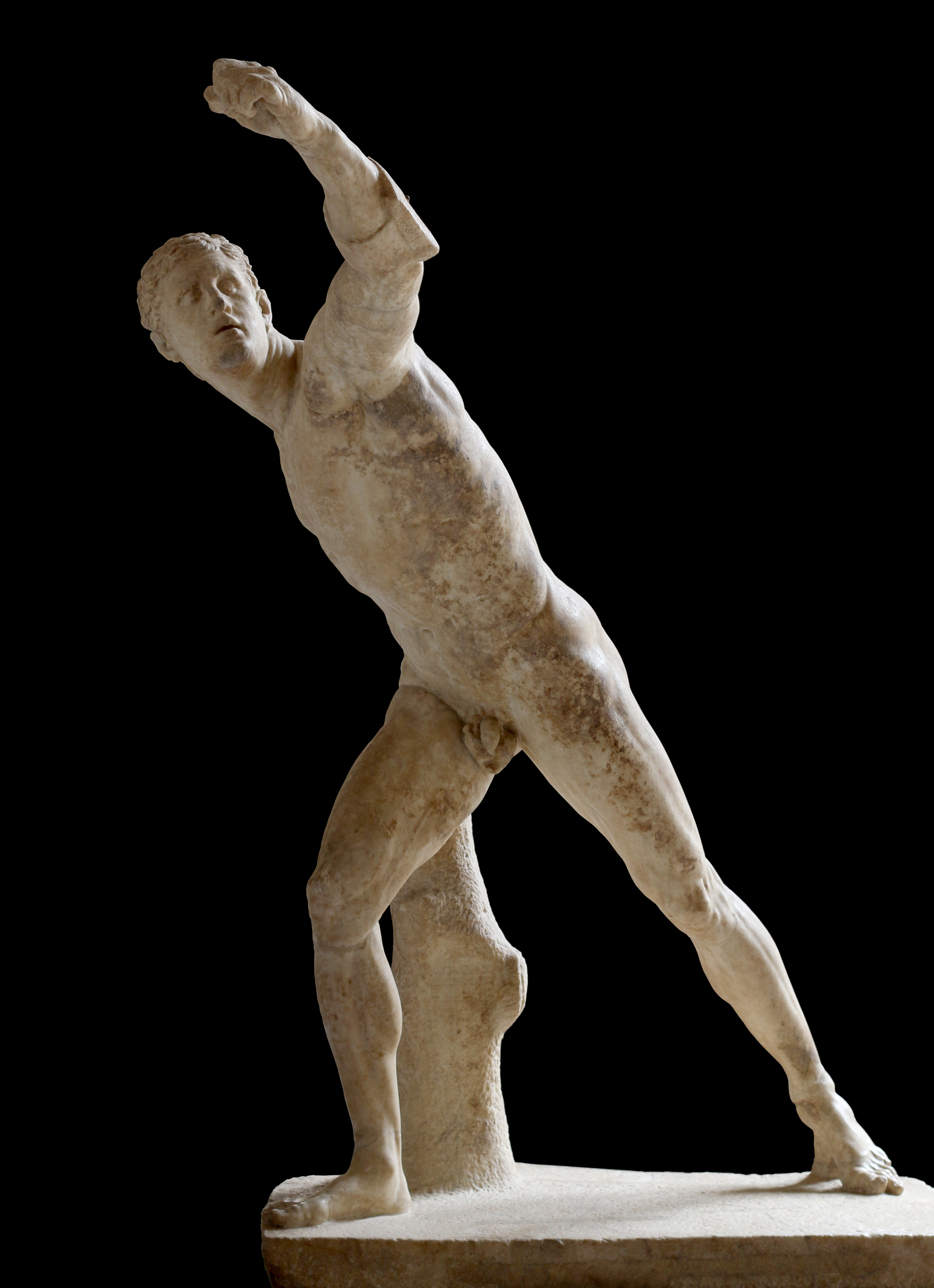
The so-called "Borghese Gladiator", the work of Agasias of Ephesus (Louvre Museum)

In many ways, The Gladiator embodied these Enlightenment ideas. The use of the model of the Borghese Gladiator made the painting a sort of "modern genre image." Models of the Borghese Gladiator, such as the one in the image, were common items that were available for sale and display in the households of the professional upper class. The use of the Borghese Gladiator also upholds the idealistic, heroic, and classical ideals of The academy.

== The Theme of Learning ==
The Gladiator references the theme of learning that characterizes The Enlightenment. Specifically, The Gladiator refers to the Lockean view of sight, a popular view that suggests that sight is what fuels the development of the intellect. The darkness of the room has been suggested to serve as a metaphor for the space in the mind that will be filled with the new ideas that are developed through sight. The elderly man on the left, a scholar, appears to be presenting the Gladiator, which is made evident by his pose. He is pushing the Gladiator reproduction forward in a way that does not allow him a good view of the subject, but provides the perfect angle for his pupils. He is thought to be representative of the wisdom that the older generations provide and a reminder that a love of art and pursuit of knowledge can never be satisfied. He is the educator in these scene, with his two pupils observing and sketching the model. The idea of learning from sight is further supported by the drawings that the younger men are creating. This shows the “visual experience” of knowledge and thought.
