= Joseph Wright of Derby =

English painter (1734–1797)

Joseph Wright
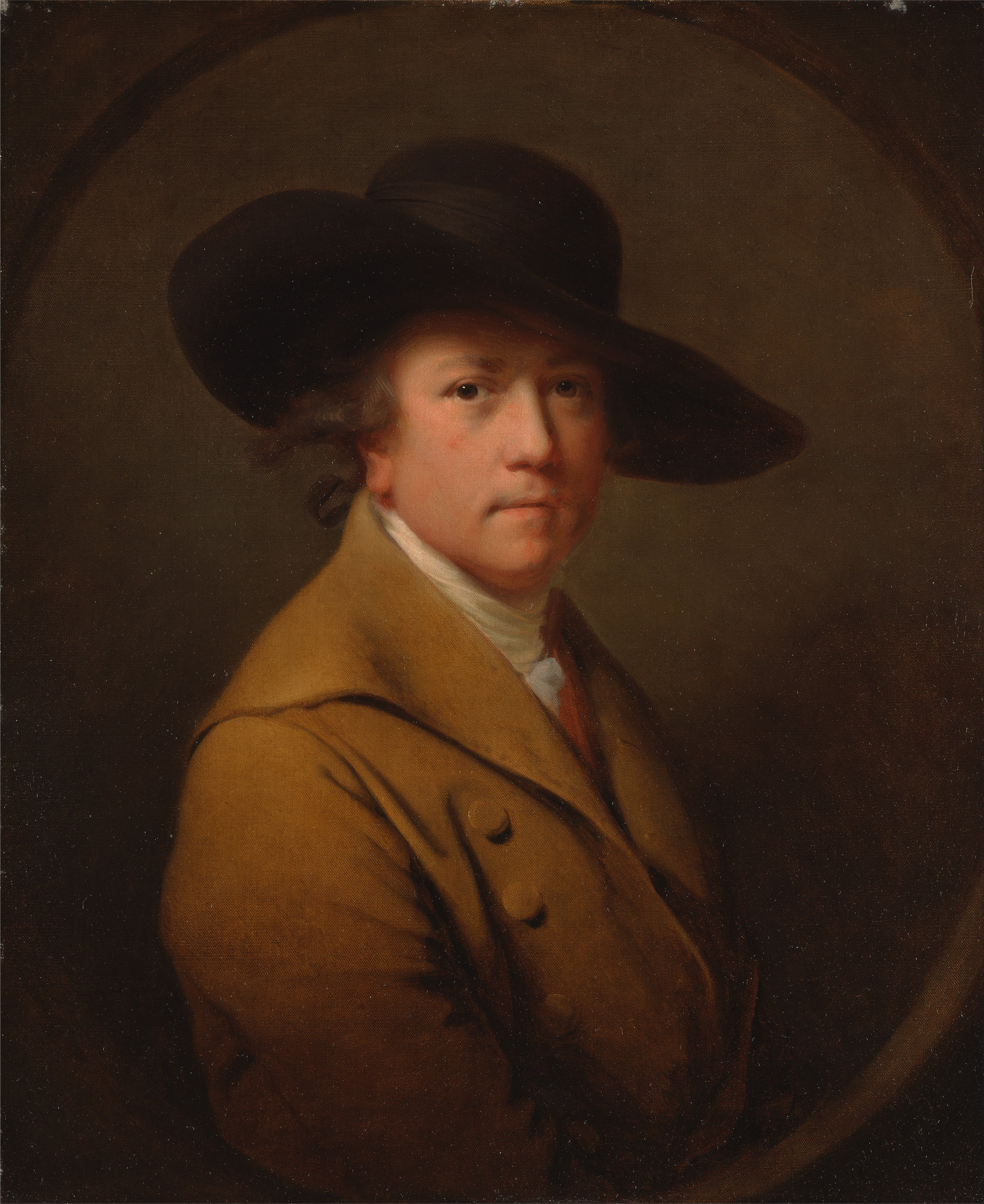
- Self-portrait, c. 1780
- Born: 3 September 1734; Derby, England
- Died: 29 August 1797 (aged 62); Derby, England
- Resting place: St Alkmund's Church, Derby
- Other name: Wright of Derby
- Occupation: Painter
- Works: An Experiment on a Bird in the Air Pump
- Spouse: Ann Swift (m. 1773; died 1790)
- Children: 6

Joseph Wright ARA (3 September 1734 – 29 August 1797), styled Joseph Wright of Derby, was an English painter who specialised in portrait painting and landscape art. He has been acclaimed as "the first professional painter to express the spirit of the Industrial Revolution".

Wright is notable for his use of tenebrism, an exaggerated form of the better known chiaroscuro effect, which emphasises the contrast of light and dark, and for his paintings of candle-lit subjects. His paintings of the birth of science out of alchemy, often based on the meetings of the Lunar Society of Birmingham, a group of scientists and industrialists living in the English Midlands, are a significant record of the struggle of science against religious values in the period known as the Age of Enlightenment.

Many of Wright's paintings and drawings are owned by Derby City Council, and are on display at the Derby Museum and Art Gallery.

== Life ==
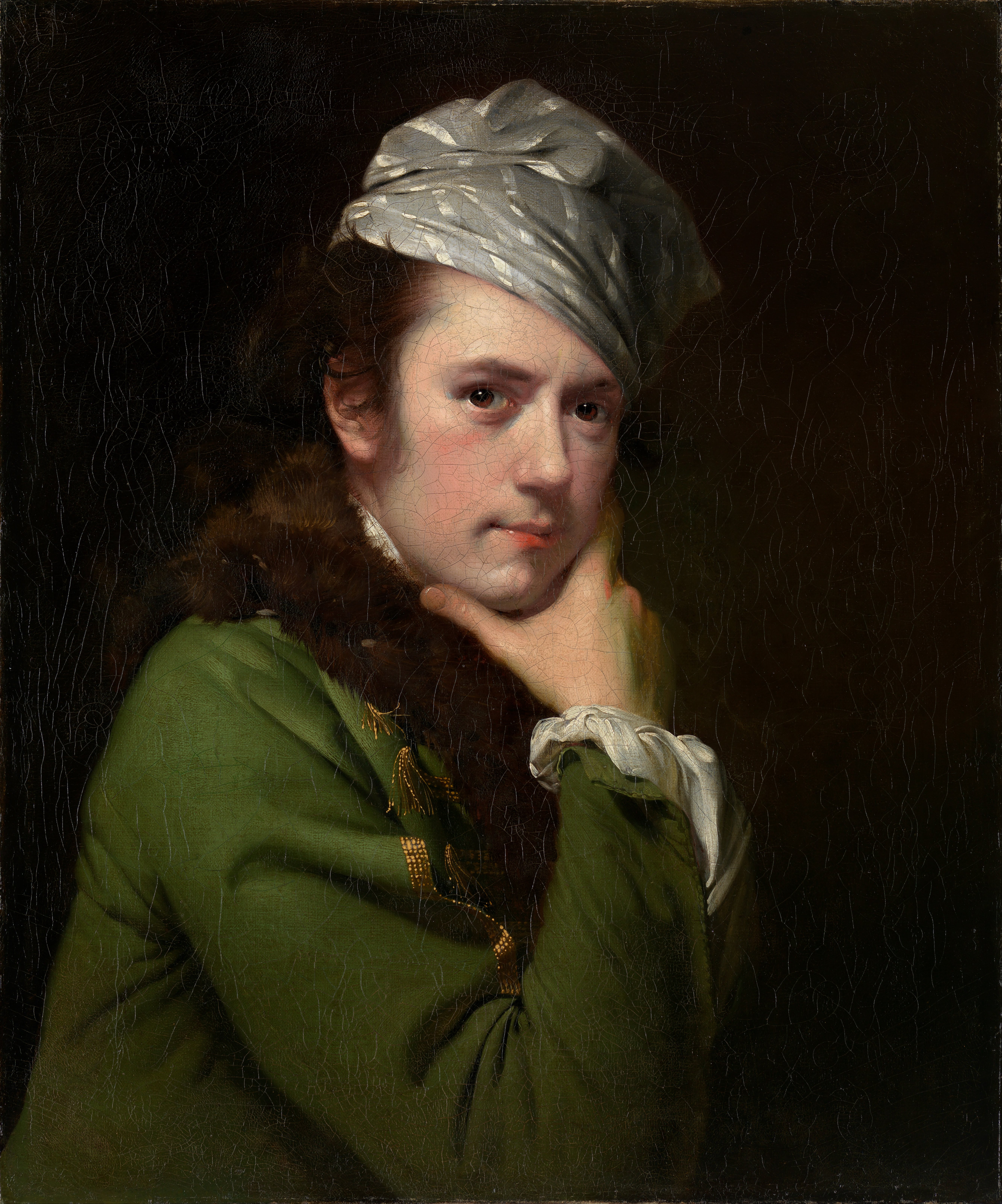
Self-portrait as a young man, 1765–1768, National Gallery of Victoria, Melbourne

Joseph Wright was born in Irongate, Derby, to a respectable family of lawyers. He was the third of five children of Hannah Brookes (1700–1764) and John Wright (1697–1767), an attorney and the town clerk of Derby. Joseph had two elder brothers, John and Richard Wright.

Deciding to become a painter, as a seventeen-year old youth Wright went to London in 1751 and for two years studied under Thomas Hudson, the master of Joshua Reynolds. Wright acknowledged that he was also influenced by Alexander Cozens and applied his composition ideas to paintings.

After painting portraits for a while in Derby, the young Wright again worked as an assistant to Hudson for fifteen months. In 1753 he returned to, and settled in Derby. He varied his work in portraiture by the production of subjects with strong tenebrism under artificial light, with which his name is chiefly associated, and by landscape painting. Wright also spent a productive period in Liverpool, from 1768 to 1771, painting portraits. These included pictures of a number of prominent citizens and their families. It was around this time that he became known as Wright "of Derby", to distinguish him from the artist Richard Wright, also based in Liverpool.

Having established himself in his profession Wright married Ann (also known as Hannah) Swift, the daughter of a Derbyshire lead miner, on 28 July 1773.

Wright set off in 1773 with John Downman, a newly pregnant Ann Wright, and Richard Hurleston for Italy. Their ship took shelter for three weeks in Nice before they completed their outward voyage in Livorno in Italy in February 1774. Downman returned to Britain in 1775. Although he spent a great deal of productive time in Naples, Wright never witnessed any major eruption of Mount Vesuvius. However, it is possible that he witnessed smaller, less impressive eruptions, which may have inspired many of his subsequent paintings of the volcano.

On his return from his working sojourn in Italy he again established himself in England as a portrait-painter, this time at the fashionable spa resort of Bath. But he met with little encouragement there, and in 1777 returned to Derby where he spent the rest of his life. Over the years he became increasingly asthmatic and nervous about the house, and for these complaints he was treated by his friend and leading medical doctor Erasmus Darwin. His friendship with Darwin had brought him and his works into the orbit of the Lunar Society of Birmingham, and although he was not a formal member of the Society he can be considered a key artistic influence on the men of the Midlands Enlightenment.

In addition to his contacts in the Lunar Society, his friends and acquaintances included the cartographer Peter Perez Burdett, who appears in several of Wright's paintings, the poet William Hayley, and businessman John Leigh Philips.

In his latter years Wright was a frequent contributor to the exhibitions of the Society of Artists of Great Britain, and to those of the Royal Academy, of which he was elected an associate in 1781 and a full member in 1784. He, however, declined the latter honour on account of a slight that he believed that he had received, and severed his official connection with the Academy, although he continued to contribute to the exhibitions from 1783 until 1794.

His wife Ann Wright died on 17 August 1790, having borne six children from the marriage, three of whom had died in infancy. On 29 August 1797 Wright himself died at his new home at No. 28 Queen Street, Derby, where he had spent his final months with his two daughters.

== Career and works ==
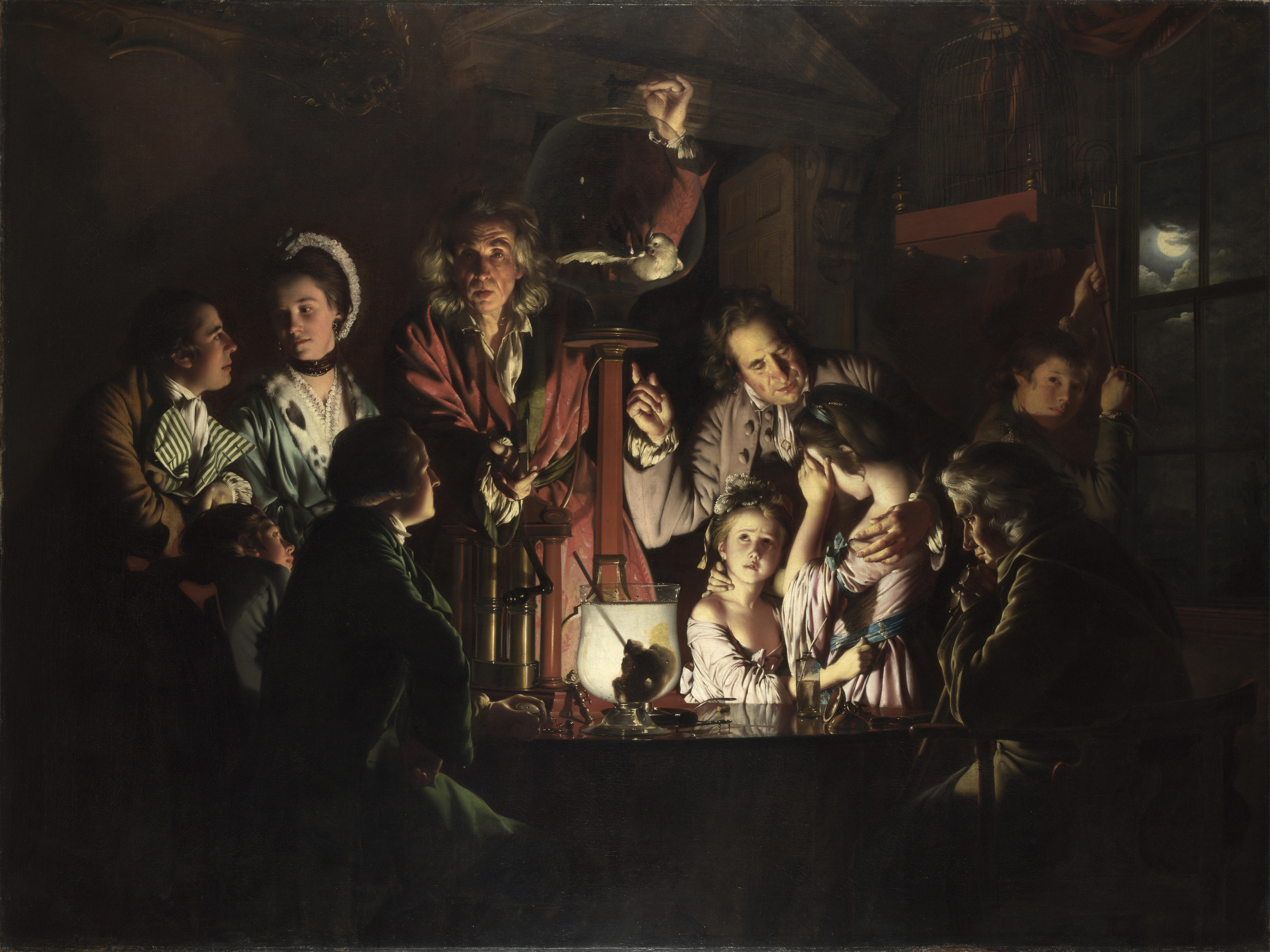
An Experiment on a Bird in the Air Pump (1768)

Wright is seen at his best in his candlelit subjects of which the Three Persons Viewing the Gladiator by Candlelight (1765), his A Philosopher Lecturing on the Orrery (1766), in the Derby Museum and Art Gallery, and An Experiment on a Bird in the Air Pump (1768), in the National Gallery are excellent examples. In many of these works, including these three, the actual source of the light is hidden.

A memorable image from his tour of the Lake District is Rydal Waterfall of 1795. His landscape paintings often include night scenes, considered difficult by many painters. He painted Dovedale by Moonlight, capturing the rural landscape of Dovedale, a narrow valley 14 miles northwest of Wright's home town of Derby, at night with a full moon. The painting hangs in the Allen Memorial Art Museum at Oberlin College. Its companion piece, Dovedale by Sunlight (c. 1784–1785) captures the colours of day.

Moonlight Landscape, held in the John and Mable Ringling Museum of Art in Sarasota, Florida, is another of his nighttime landscape paintings. The painting is very dramatic, an apparently full moon is obscured by an arched bridge over water, but illuminates the scene, making the water sparkle in contrast to the dusky landscape.

Cave at Evening is painted with the same dramatic chiaroscuro for which Wright is noted. The painting was executed during 1774, while he was staying in Italy. There are similarities to the Museum of Fine Arts, Boston's holding, Grotto by the Seaside in the Kingdom of Naples with Banditti, Sunset (1778).

=== Painting the British Enlightenment ===
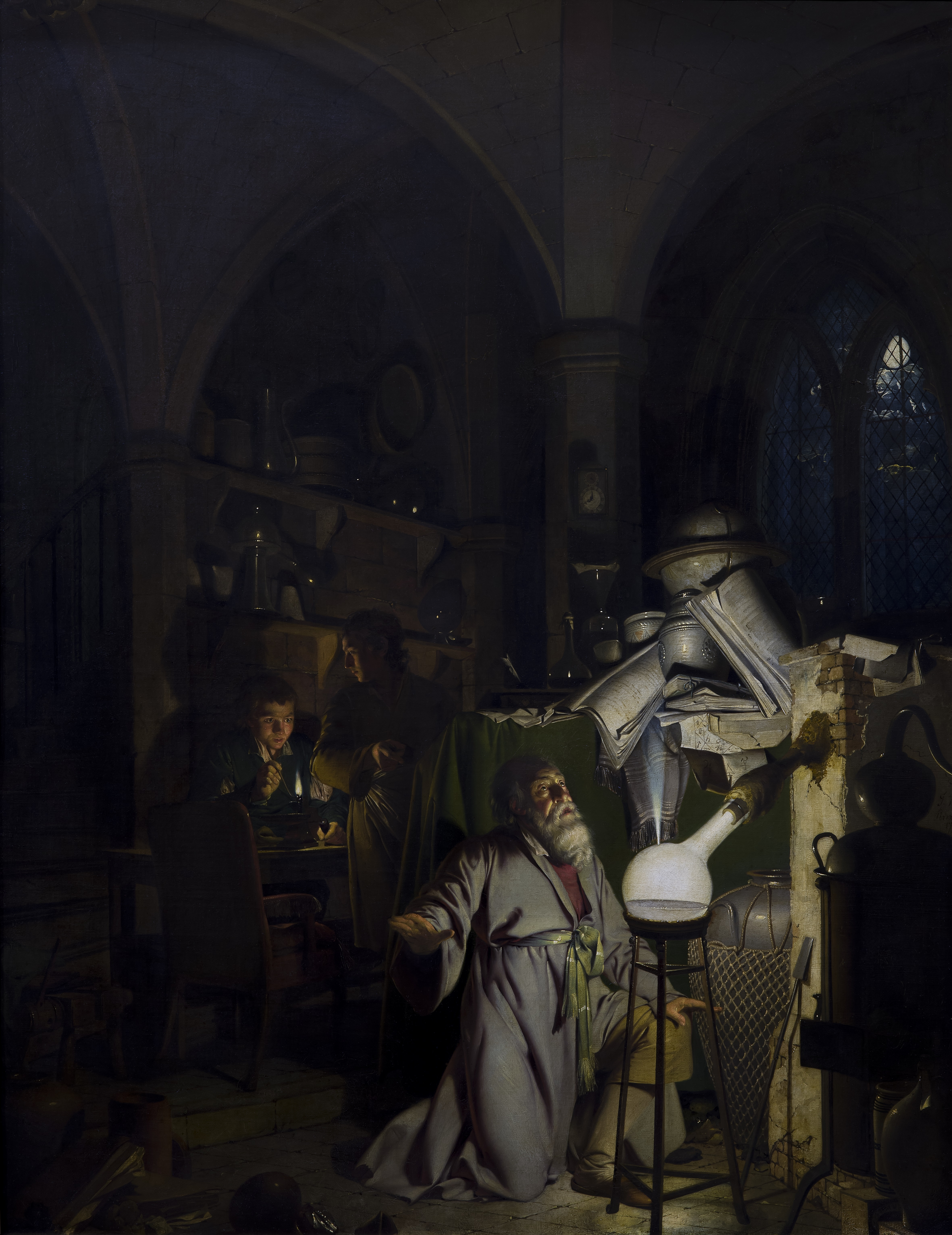
The Alchemist Discovering Phosphorus (1771)

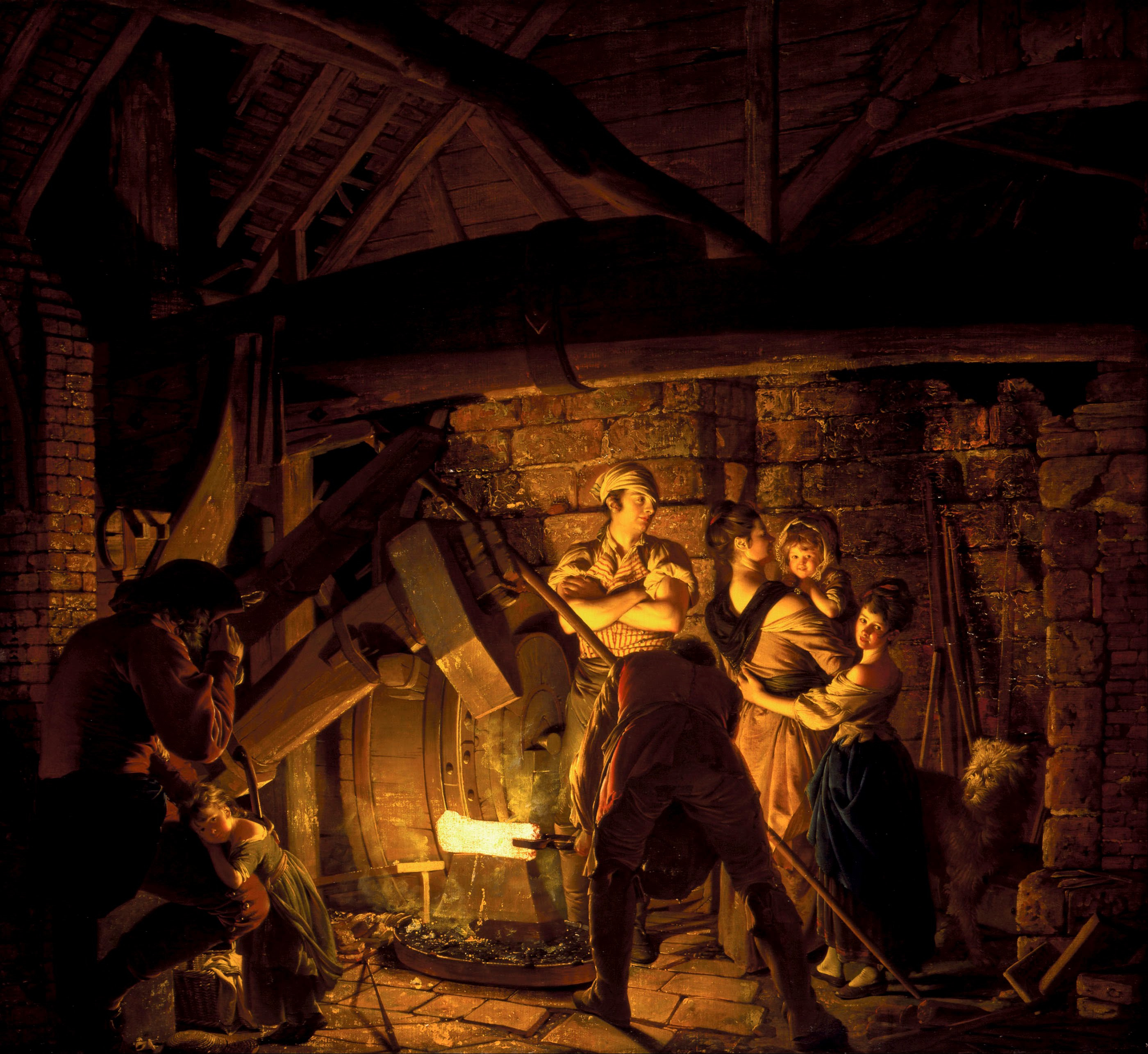
An Iron Forge, (1772)

Wright had close contact with the pioneering industrialists of the English Midlands. Two of his most important patrons were Josiah Wedgwood, credited with the industrialization of the manufacture of pottery, and Richard Arkwright, regarded as the creator of the factory system in the cotton industry. One of Wright's students, William Tate, was uncle to the eccentric gentleman tunneller, Joseph Williamson, and completed some of Wright's works after his death. Wright also had connections with Erasmus Darwin and other members of the Lunar Society, which brought together leading industrialists, scientists, and philosophers. Although meetings were held in or near Birmingham, Darwin, grandfather of Charles Darwin, lived in Derby, and some of the paintings by Wright, which are notable for their use of brilliant light on shade, are of, or were inspired by, Lunar Society gatherings.

A Philosopher Lecturing on the Orrery (1766) shows an early mechanism for demonstrating the movement of the planets around the Sun. The Scottish scientist James Ferguson (1710–1776) undertook a series of lectures in Derby in July 1762 based on his book Lectures on Select Subjects in Mechanics, Hydrostatics, Pneumatics, Optics &c. (1760). To illustrate his lectures, Ferguson used various machines, models, and instruments. Wright may have attended these talks, especially as tickets were available from John Whitehurst, Wright's close neighbour, a clockmaker and a scientist. Wright could have drawn on Whitehurst's practical knowledge to learn more about the orrery and its operation. Wright painted a portrait of Whitehurst, who was another member of the Lunar Society.

An Experiment on a Bird in the Air Pump (1768) shows people gathered to observe an early experiment into the nature of air and its ability to support life.

The Alchemist Discovering Phosphorus (1771) depicts the discovery of the element phosphorus by German alchemist Hennig Brand in 1669. A flask in which a large quantity of urine has been boiled down is seen bursting into light as the phosphorus, which is abundant in urine, ignites spontaneously in air.

These factual paintings are considered to also have metaphorical meaning, the bursting into light of the phosphorus in front of a praying figure signifying the problematic transition from faith to scientific understanding and enlightenment, and the various expressions on the figures around the bird in the air pump indicating concern over the possible inhumanity of the coming age of science.

These paintings represent a high point in scientific enquiry that began to undermine the power of religion in Western societies. Some ten years later, scientists would find themselves persecuted in the backlash to the French Revolution of 1789. Joseph Priestley, a member of the Lunar Society, left Britain in 1794 after his Birmingham laboratory was smashed and his house burned down by a mob objecting to his outspoken support for the French Revolution. In France, the chemist Antoine Lavoisier was executed by the guillotine at the height of the Terror. The politician and philosopher Edmund Burke, in his famous Reflections on the Revolution in France (1790), tied natural philosophers, and specifically Priestley, to the French Revolution; he later wrote in his Letter to a Noble Lord (1796) that radicals who supported science in Britain "considered man in their experiments no more than they do mice in an air pump". In light of this comment, Wright's painting of the bird in the air pump, completed more than twenty years earlier, seems particularly prescient. It was against this background that Charles Darwin, grandson of Erasmus Darwin, would add to the conflict between science and religious belief, half a century later, with the publication of his book The Origin of Species in 1859.

== Memorials ==
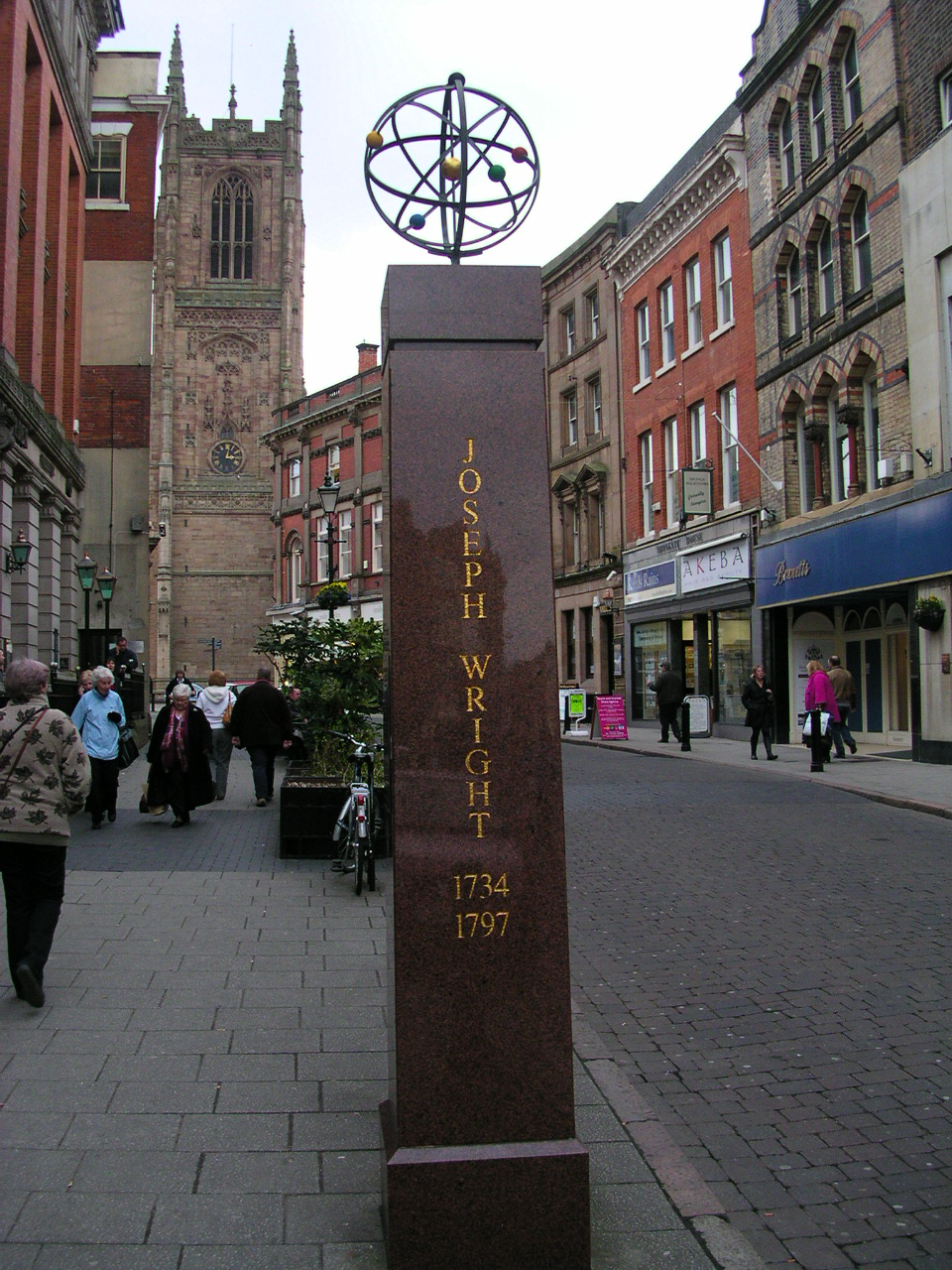
The armillary sphere memorial in Irongate, Derby

Wright's birthplace at 28 Irongate, Derby, is commemorated with a representation of an armillary sphere on the pavement nearby.

Joseph Wright was buried in the grounds of St Alkmund's Church, Derby. The church was demolished in 1968 to make way for a major new section of the inner ring road cutting through the town centre, and its site now lies beneath the road. Wright's remains were removed to Nottingham Road Cemetery. In 1997, his tombstone was placed at the side of Derby Cathedral, and in 2002, it was brought inside and wall-mounted in a prominent place near the well-visited memorial to Bess of Hardwick.

Wright's name has been given to the sixth-form centre situated on Cathedral Row, Derby (not far from Iron Gate). The Joseph Wright Centre was opened in 2005 as the new flagship site for Derby College. The building is named after the eighteenth-century painter because his "artwork captured the many scientific and technological advances of the Industrial Revolution."

In early 2013 Derby City Council and Derby Civic Society announced they would erect a blue plaque on his home at 27 Queen Street in Derby.

== Other works ==
- Peter Perez Burdett and His First Wife Hannah (1765)
- An Academy by Lamplight (1769)
- Vesuvius from Posillipo by Moonlight (1774)
- Grotto by the Seaside in the Kingdom of Naples with Banditti, Sunset (1778) Museum of Fine Arts, Boston
- Peter Labilliere (1780) Dorking Museum, UK
- Indian Widow (1784)
- Miss Mary Tunaley (1790–93) Museum of Fine Arts, Boston
- Romeo and Juliet: the Tomb Scene (1790) Derby Museum and Art Gallery
- Virgil's Tomb (three versions, 1779 to 1785)
- The Lady in Milton's Comus (1785) Walker Art Gallery
- Moonlight, Coast of Tuscany (1790) Tate Britain
- Portrait of Jedediah Strutt (1790) Derby Museum and Art Gallery

== Gallery ==
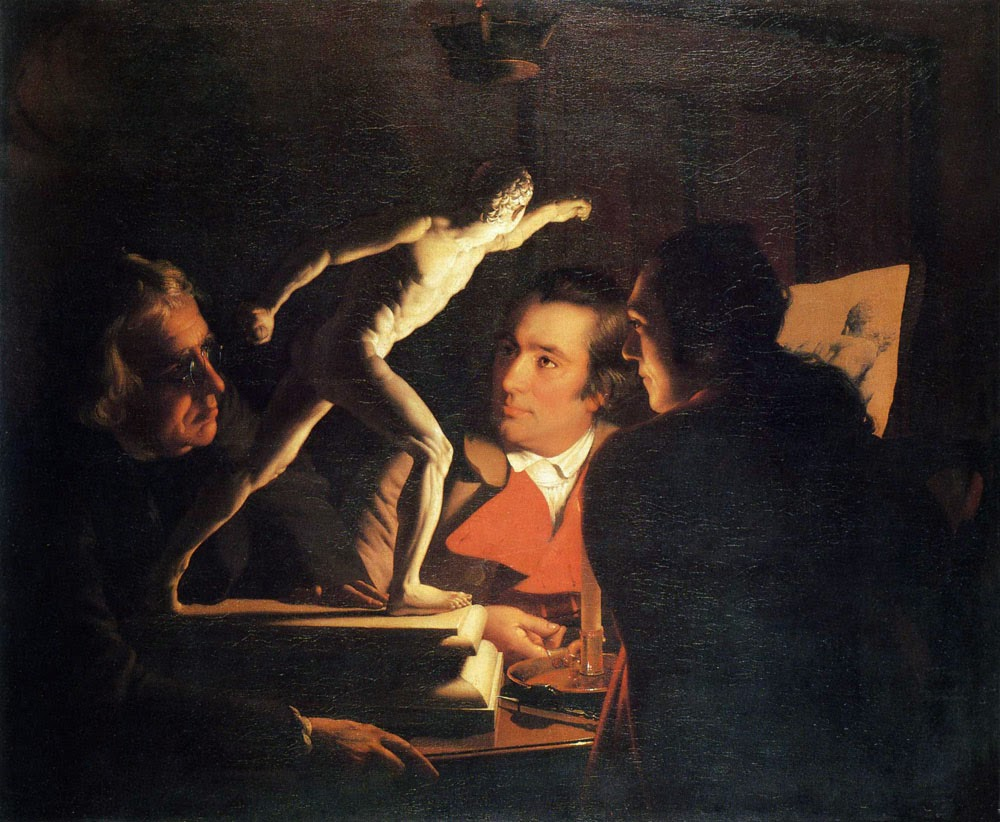
Three Persons Viewing the Gladiator by Candlelight, 1765

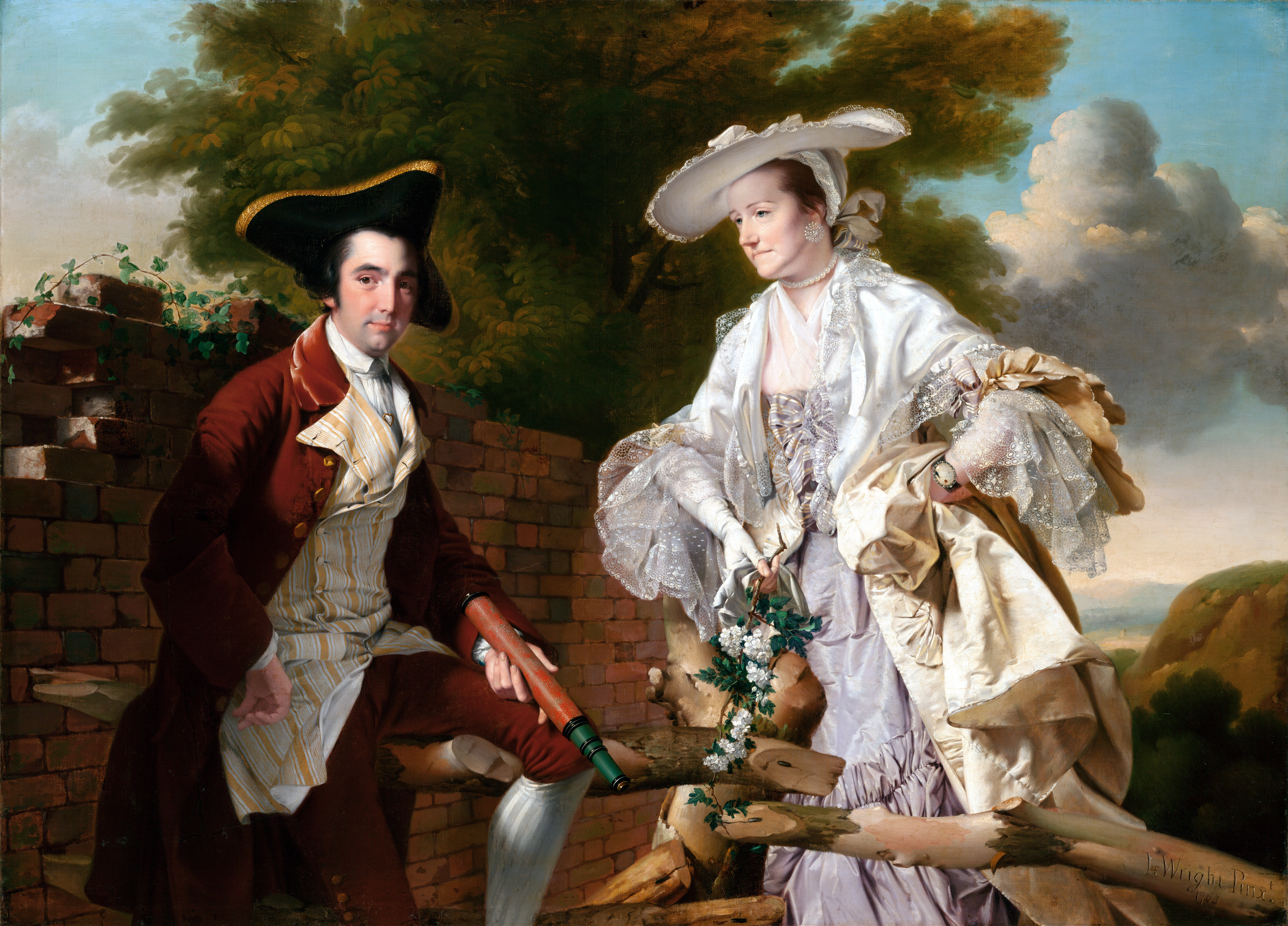
Peter Perez Burdett and His First Wife Hannah, 1765

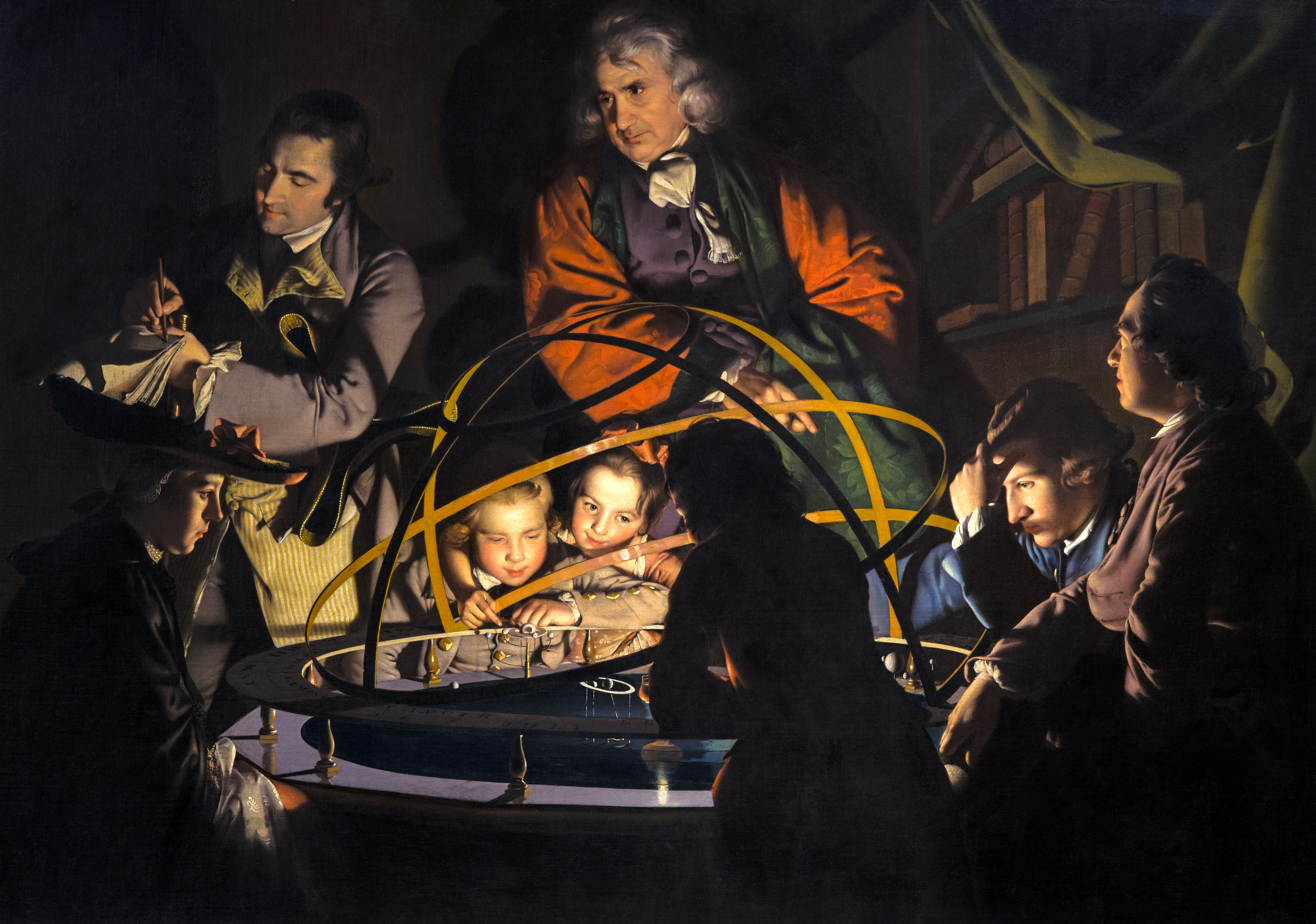
A Philosopher Lecturing on the Orrery, 1766

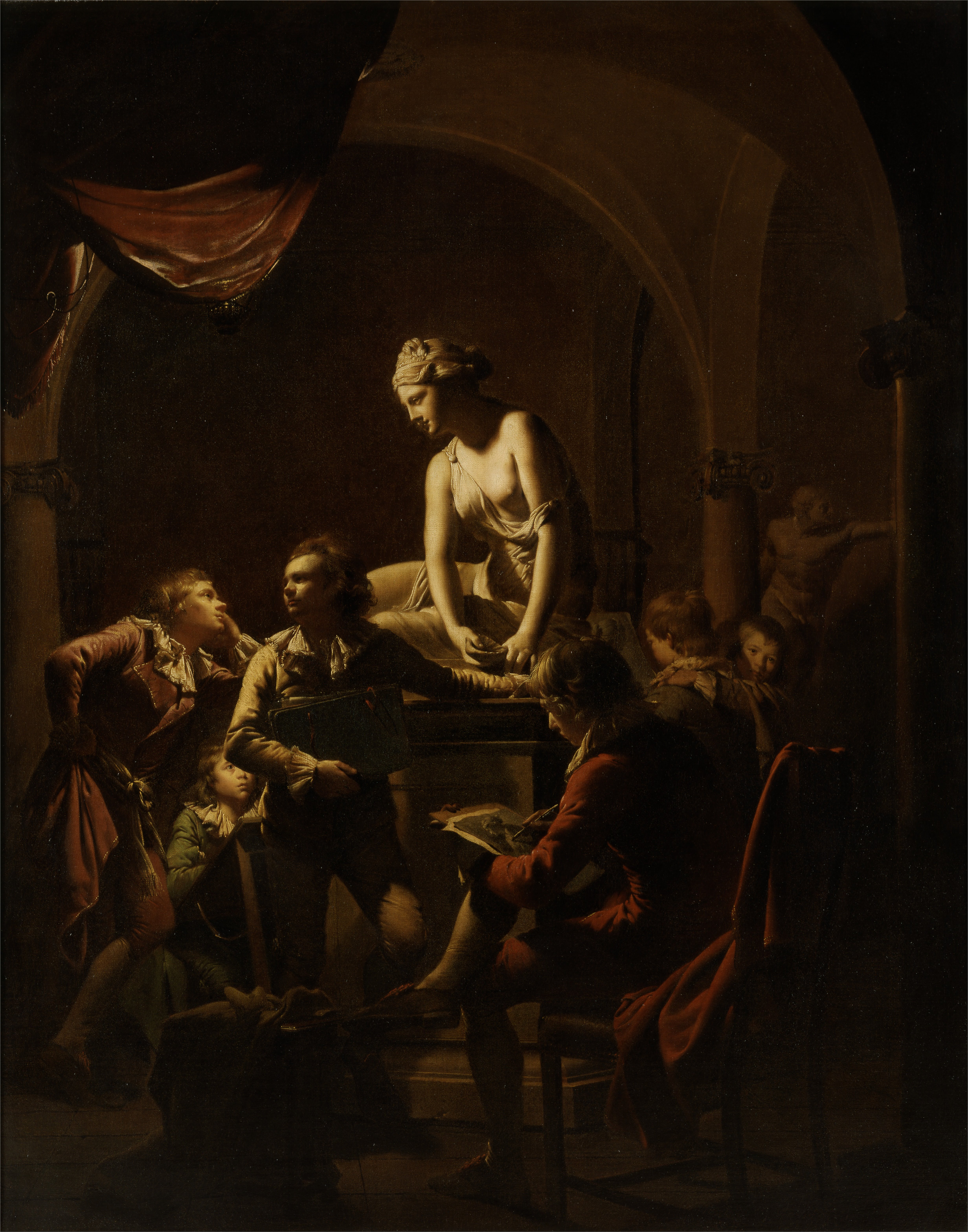
An Academy by Lamplight, 1769

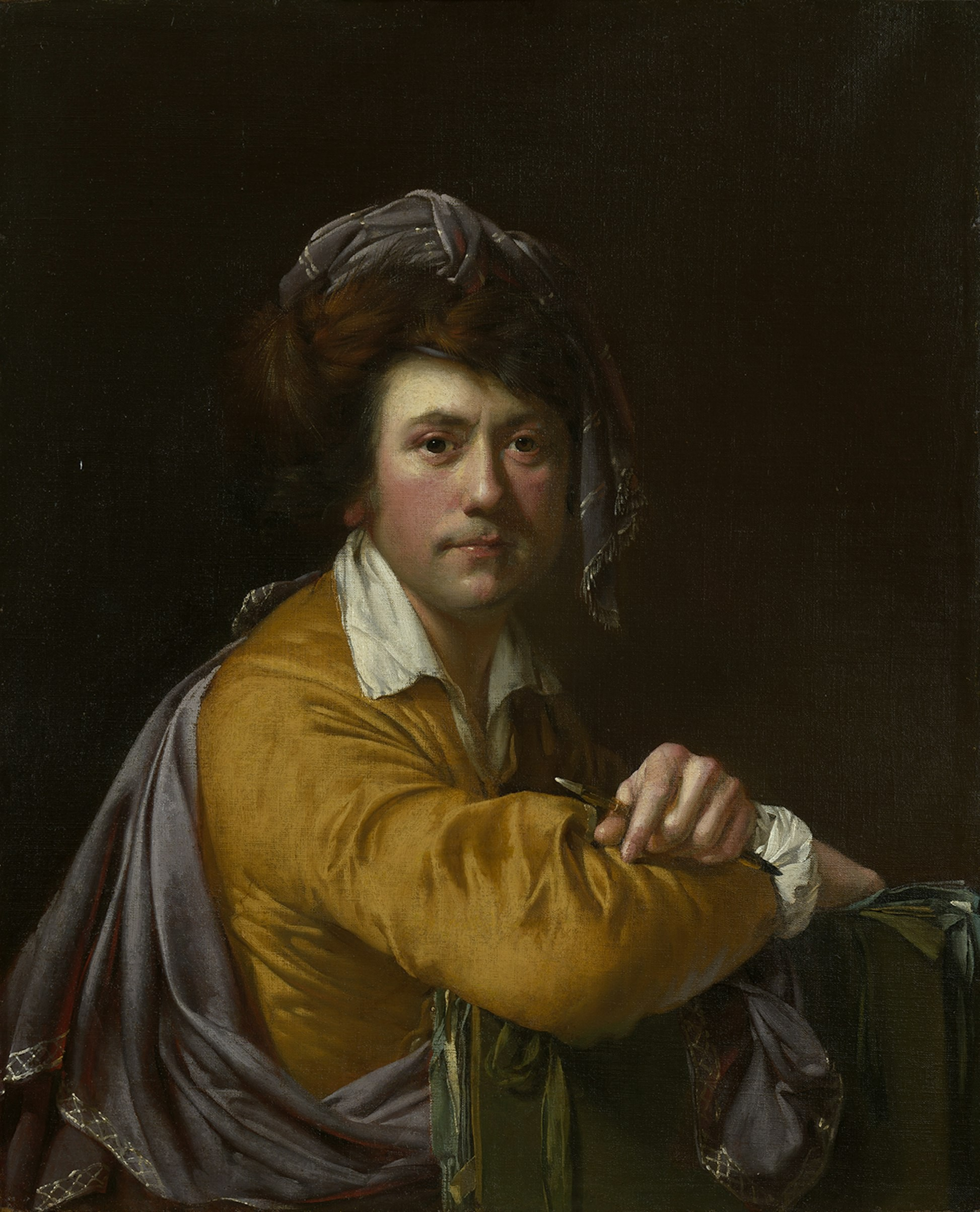
Self-Portrait, 1772

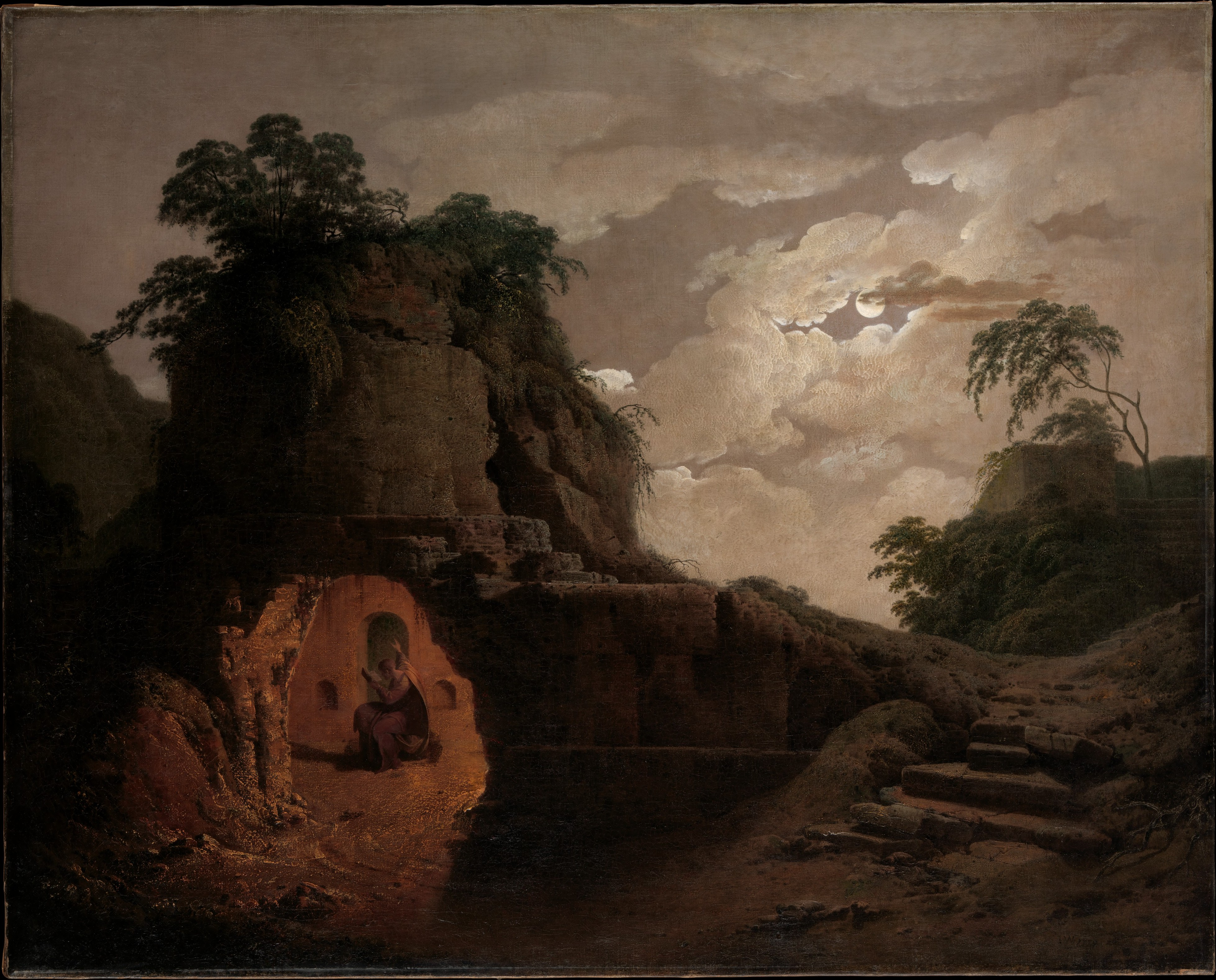
Virgil's Tomb by Moonlight, with Silius Italicus Declaiming, 1779

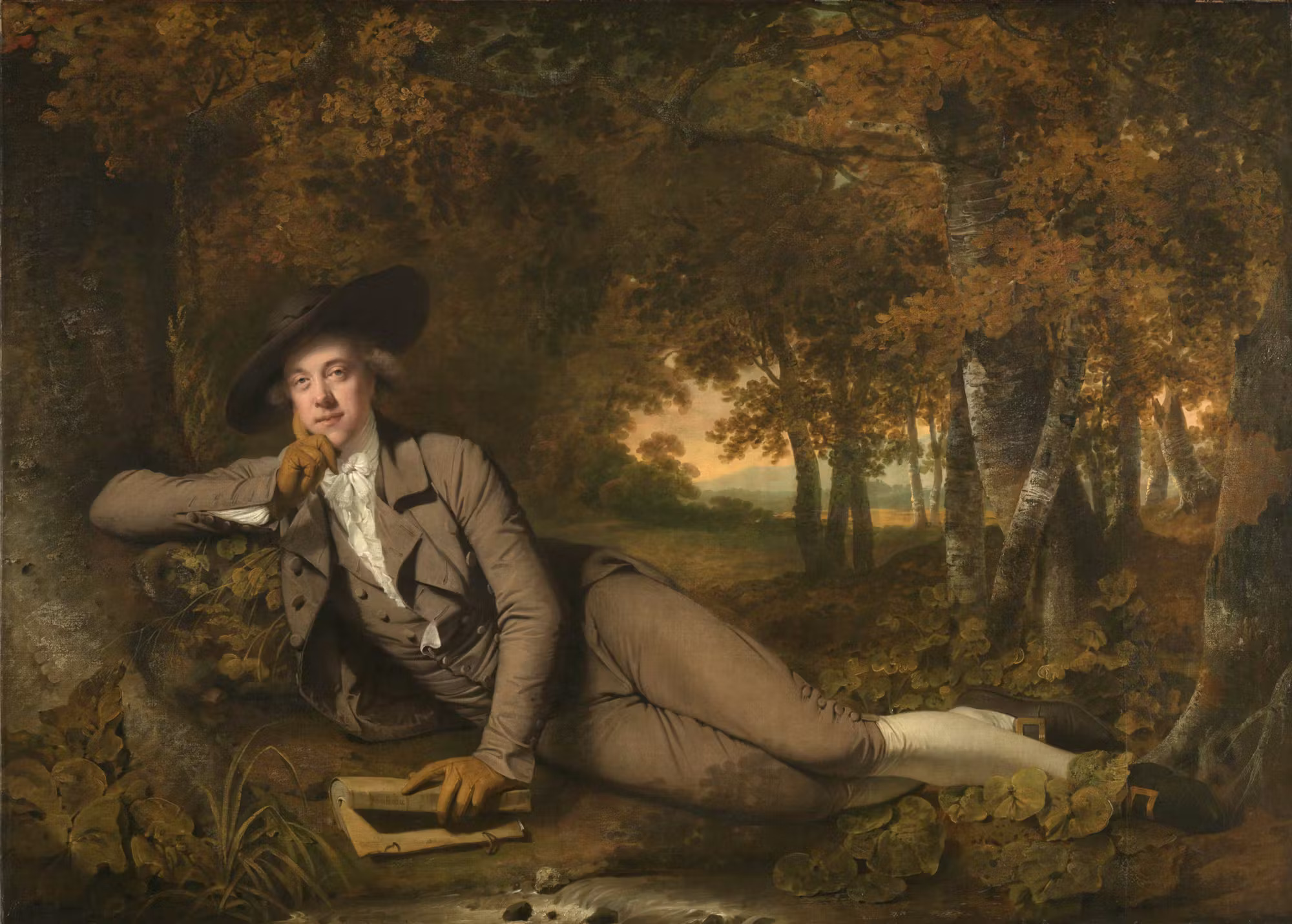
Portrait of Sir Brooke Boothby, 1781

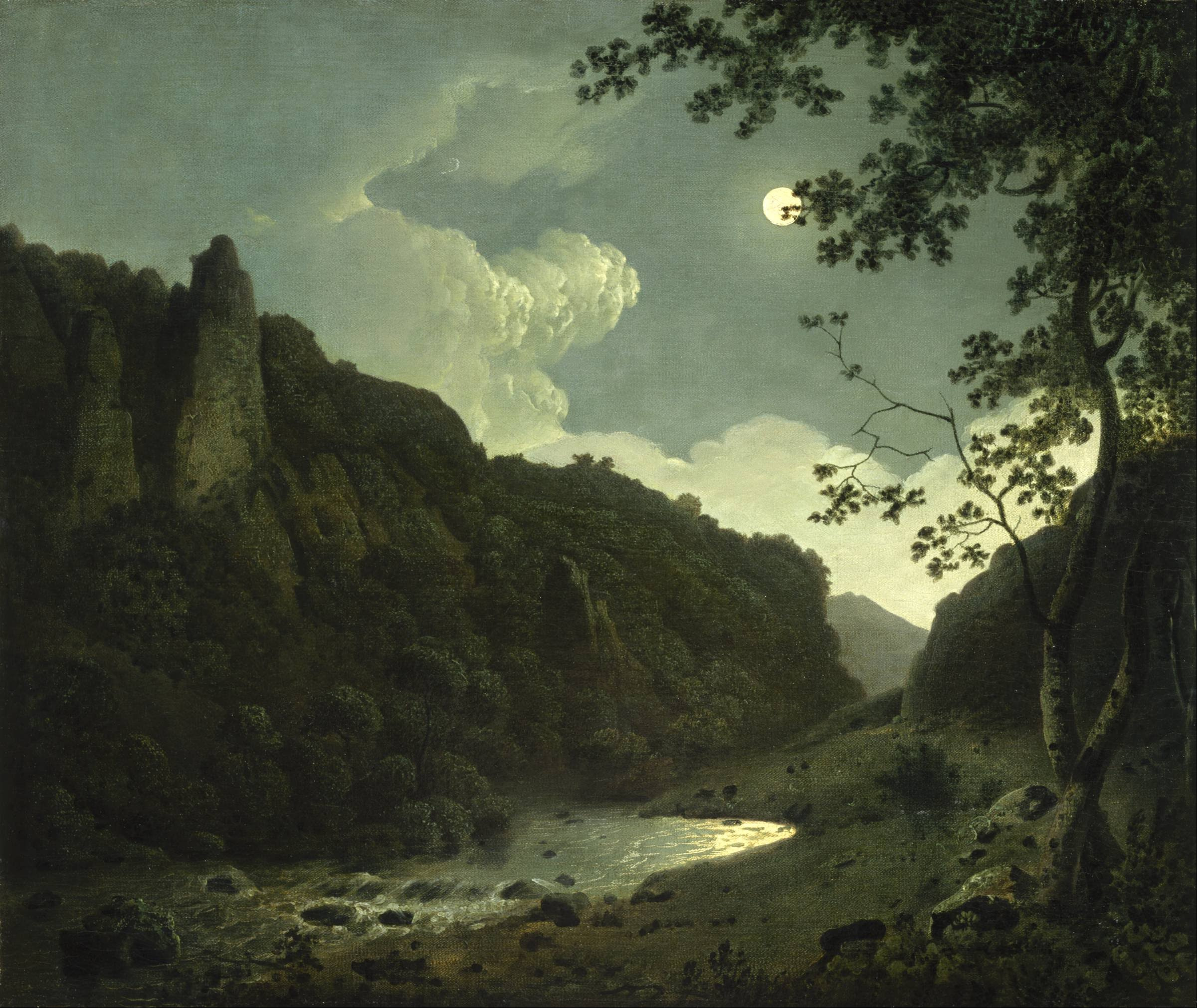
Dovedale by Moonlight, 1784

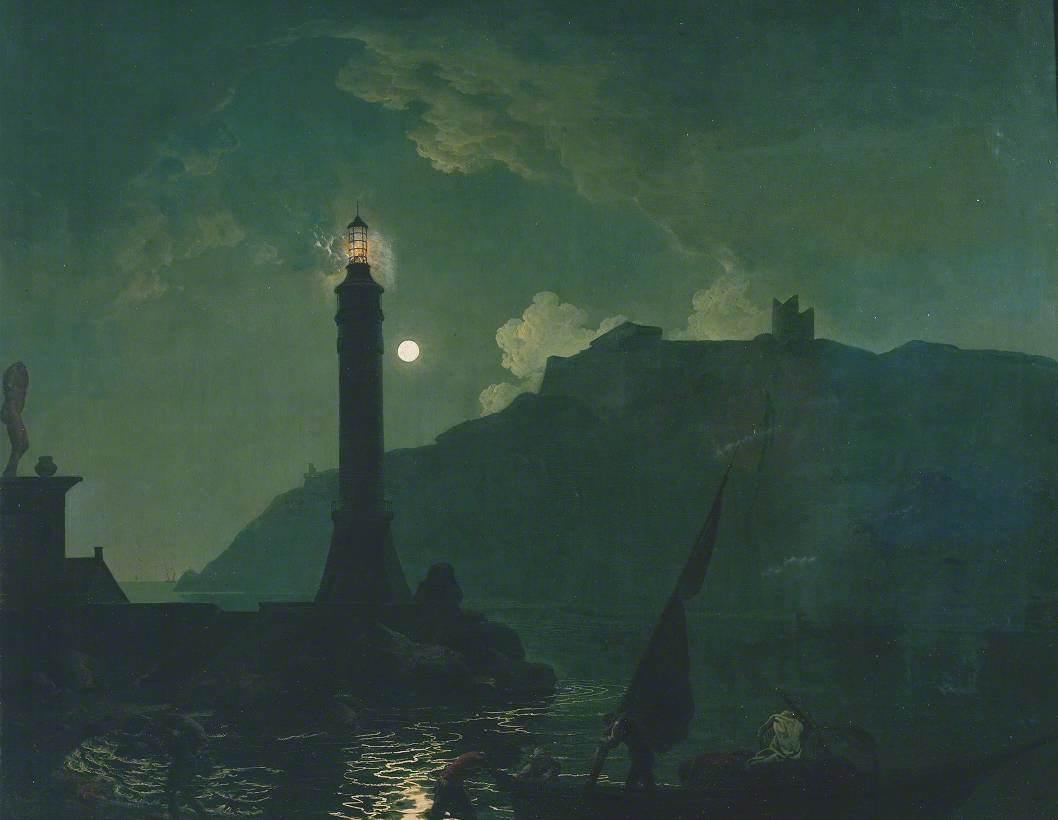
Moonlight, Coast of Tuscany, 1790

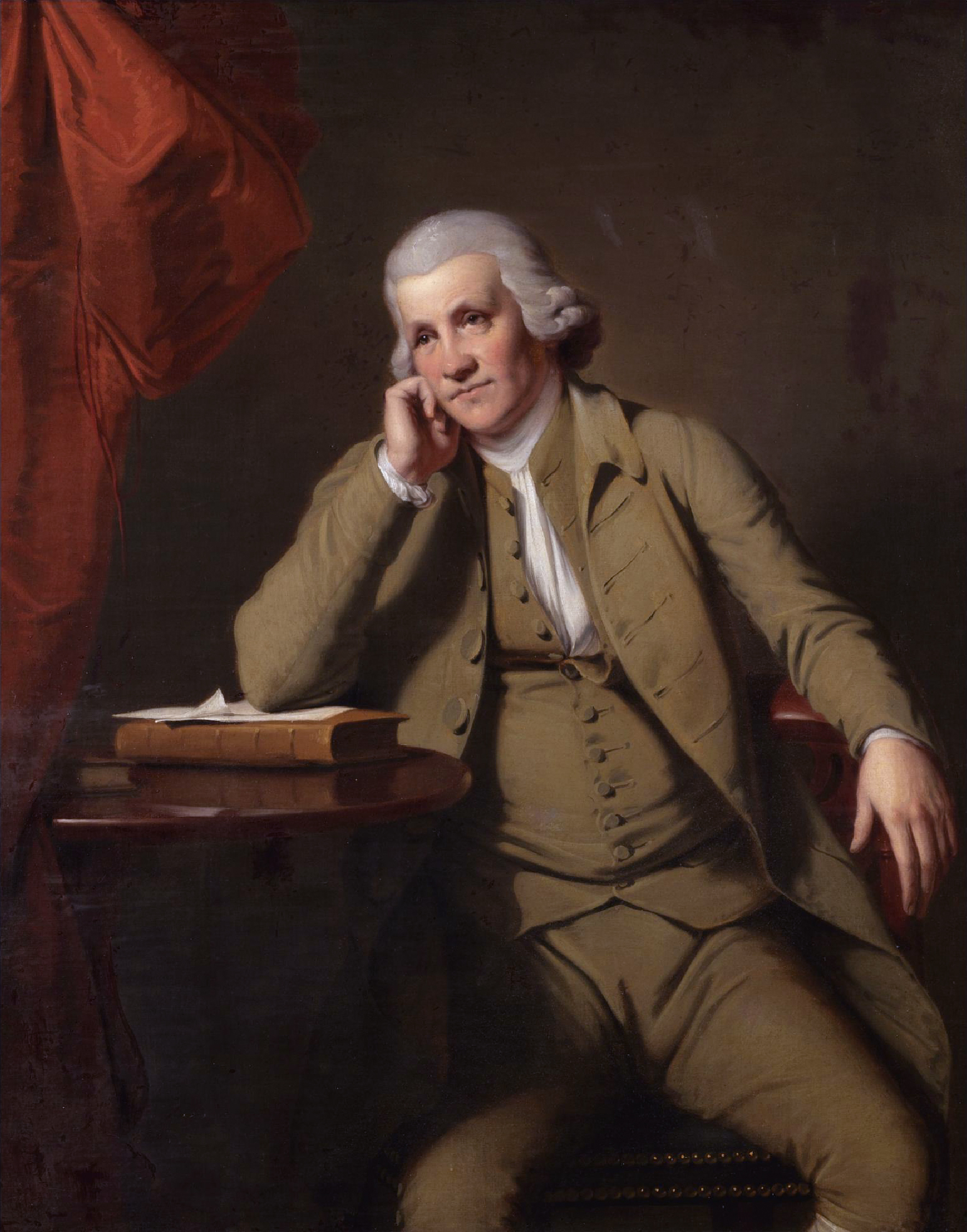
Portrait of Jedediah Strutt, 1790

Three Children of Richard Arkwright with a Goat, 1791

== See also ==
- Georges de La Tour
