= A Philosopher Lecturing on the Orrery =

1766 painting by Joseph Wright of Derby

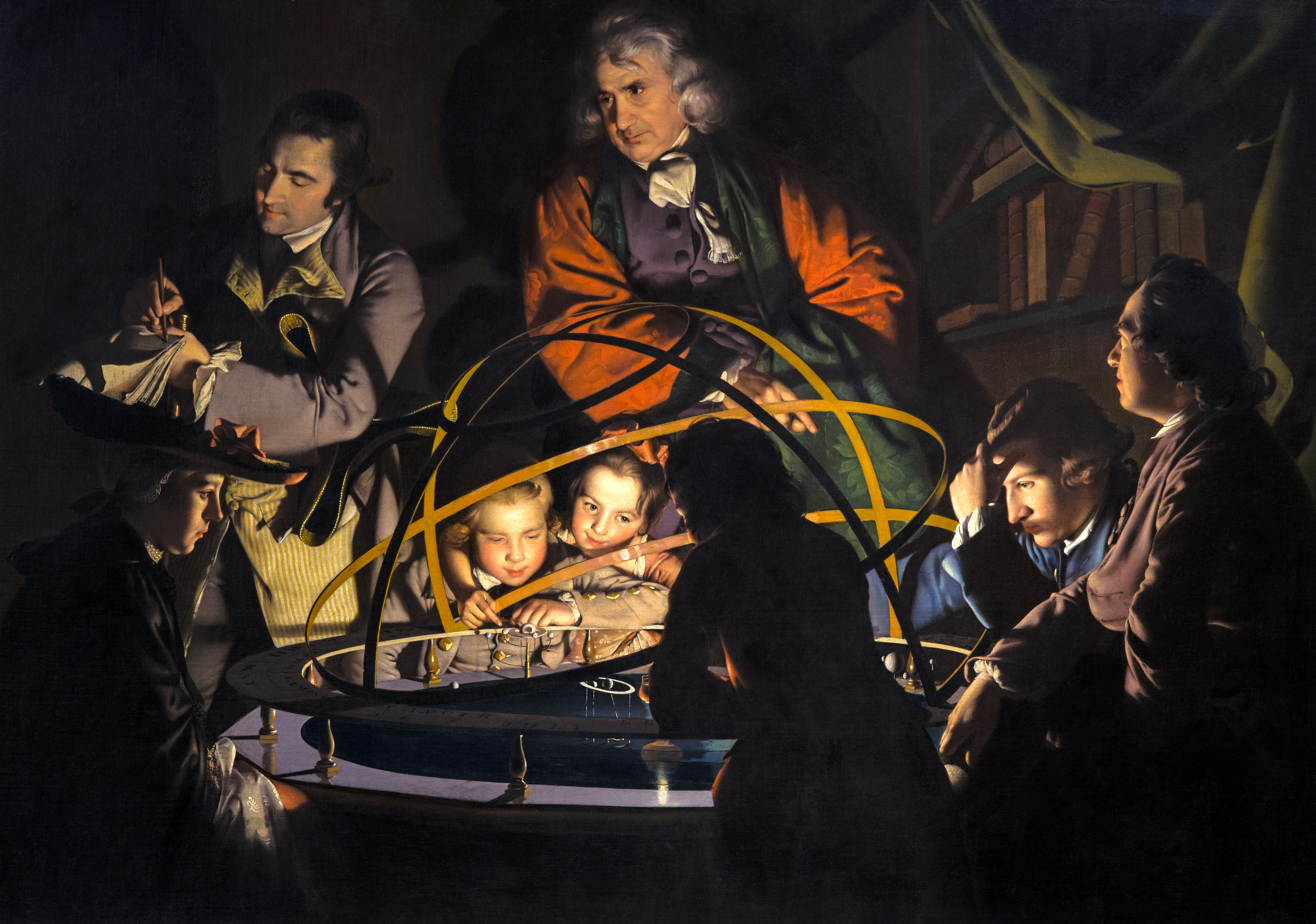
- Artist: Joseph Wright of Derby
- Year: c. 1766
- Medium: Oil on canvas
- Dimensions: 1473 mm × 2032 mm (58 in × 80 in)
- Location: Derby Museum and Art Gallery, Derby, England

A Philosopher Lecturing on the Orrery, or the full title, A Philosopher giving that Lecture on the Orrery in which a lamp is put in place of the Sun, is a 1766 painting by Joseph Wright of Derby depicting a lecturer giving a demonstration of an orrery – a mechanical model of the Solar System – to a small audience. It is now in the Derby Museum and Art Gallery. The painting preceded his similar An Experiment on a Bird in the Air Pump (National Gallery, London).

The first of Wright's candlelit masterpieces, Three Persons Viewing the Gladiator by Candlelight, was painted in 1765, and showed three men studying a small copy of the "Borghese Gladiator". The Gladiator was greatly admired; but his next painting, The Orrery, caused a greater stir, as it replaced the Classical subject at the centre of the scene with one of a scientific nature. Wright's depiction of the awe produced by scientific "miracles" marked a break with previous traditions in which the artistic depiction of such wonder was reserved for religious events, since to Wright the marvels of the technological age were as awe-inspiring as the subjects of the great religious paintings.

In both of these works, the candlelit setting had a realist justification. Viewing sculpture by candlelight, when the contours showed well, and there might even be an impression of movement from the flickering light, was a fashionable practice described by Goethe. In the orrery demonstration the shadows cast by the lamp representing the sun were an essential part of the display. But there seems no reason other than heightened drama to stage the air pump experiment in a room lit by a single candle, and in two later paintings of the subject by Charles-Amédée-Philippe van Loo the lighting is normal.

== Context ==
The painting was one of a number of British works challenging the set categories of the rigid, French-dictated, hierarchy of genres in the late 18th century, as other types of painting aspired to be treated as seriously as the costumed history painting of a Classical or mythological subject. In some respects the Orrery and Air Pump subjects resembled conversation pieces, then largely a form of middle-class portraiture, though soon to be given new status when Johann Zoffany began to paint the royal family in about 1766. Given their solemn atmosphere however, and as it seems none of the figures are intended to be understood as portraits (even if models may be identified), the paintings can not be regarded as conversation pieces. The 20th-century art historian Ellis Waterhouse compares these two works to the "genre serieux" of contemporary French drama, as defined by Denis Diderot and Pierre Beaumarchais, a view endorsed by Egerton.

An anonymous review from the time called Wright "a very great and uncommon genius in a peculiar way".

== Provenance, and portraits ==
Replica grand orrery on display alongside the original painting in Derby Museum and Art Gallery, England.

The Orrery was painted without a commission, probably in the expectation that it would be bought by Washington Shirley, 5th Earl Ferrers, a British Royal Navy officer who had an orrery of his own, and with whom Wright's friend Peter Perez Burdett was staying while in Derbyshire. Figures thought to be portraits of Burdett and Ferrers feature in the painting, Burdett taking notes and Ferrers seated with a youth next to the orrery. Ferrers purchased the painting, which was displayed at the Exhibition of 1766 of the Society of Artists, for £210, but the 6th Earl auctioned it off, and it is now in the Derby Museum and Art Gallery, where it is on permanent display, close to a working replica of a full-sized mechanical Grand Orrery. In 1768, an influential mezzotint reproduction of the painting was engraved by William Pether and published by John Boydell.

A biographer of Wright, Benedict Nicolson, argued in 1968 that John Whitehurst was the model for the lecturer, while another commentator points out the figure's resemblance to "a painting of Isaac Newton by Godfrey Kneller". Close observation of the adult faces in the picture reveals that each one demonstrates one or other of the main phases of the Moon – new moon, half moon, gibbous moon and full moon. Jonathan Powers, in The Philosopher Lecturing on the Orrery, claims that 'the Philosopher' was John Arden, a scholar and lecturer best known for teaching the young Mary Wollstonecraft.

A working reconstruction of the grand orrery depicted in Joseph Wright's painting was commissioned by Derby Museums in 1993. It was built by clock and orrery-maker, John Gleave, and is displayed alongside the original work in the museum's art gallery.
