= Robert Lovett =

Robert Lovett may refer to:

- Robert A. Lovett (1895–1986), United States Secretary of Defense
- Robert Morss Lovett (1870–1956), American educator and writer; acting Governor of the United States Virgin Islands
- Robert Q. Lovett, film editor
- Robert S. Lovett (1860–1932), chairman of the Southern Pacific Company Executive Committee 1909–1913.
- Sir Robert Lovett (17th c.) of Liscombe in Buckinghamshire, England (see Lovett baronets)
