= Richard Lovett (baron) =

Anglo-Norman baron

Richard Lovett was an Anglo-Norman baron under William the Conqueror. The surname derived from the Anglo-Norman French Lo(u)vet, a nickname which meant 'wolf cub.' Richard Lovett's sons, William and Robert Lovett were rewarded with land grants in England that were listed in the Domesday Book and stayed with the family into the twentieth-century.

Richard de Louvet's tomb is at the cathedral in Rouen, France. His name, and that of his sons' (as Guilliame Louvet) are engraved on the wall of the Notre-Dame Church at Dives-sur-Mer together with other companions of William the Conqueror, Normandy.
