= Virgil's Tomb (Joseph Wright paintings) =

Set of paintings by Joseph Wright of Derby

Virgil's Tomb by Moonlight, with Silius Italicus Declaiming
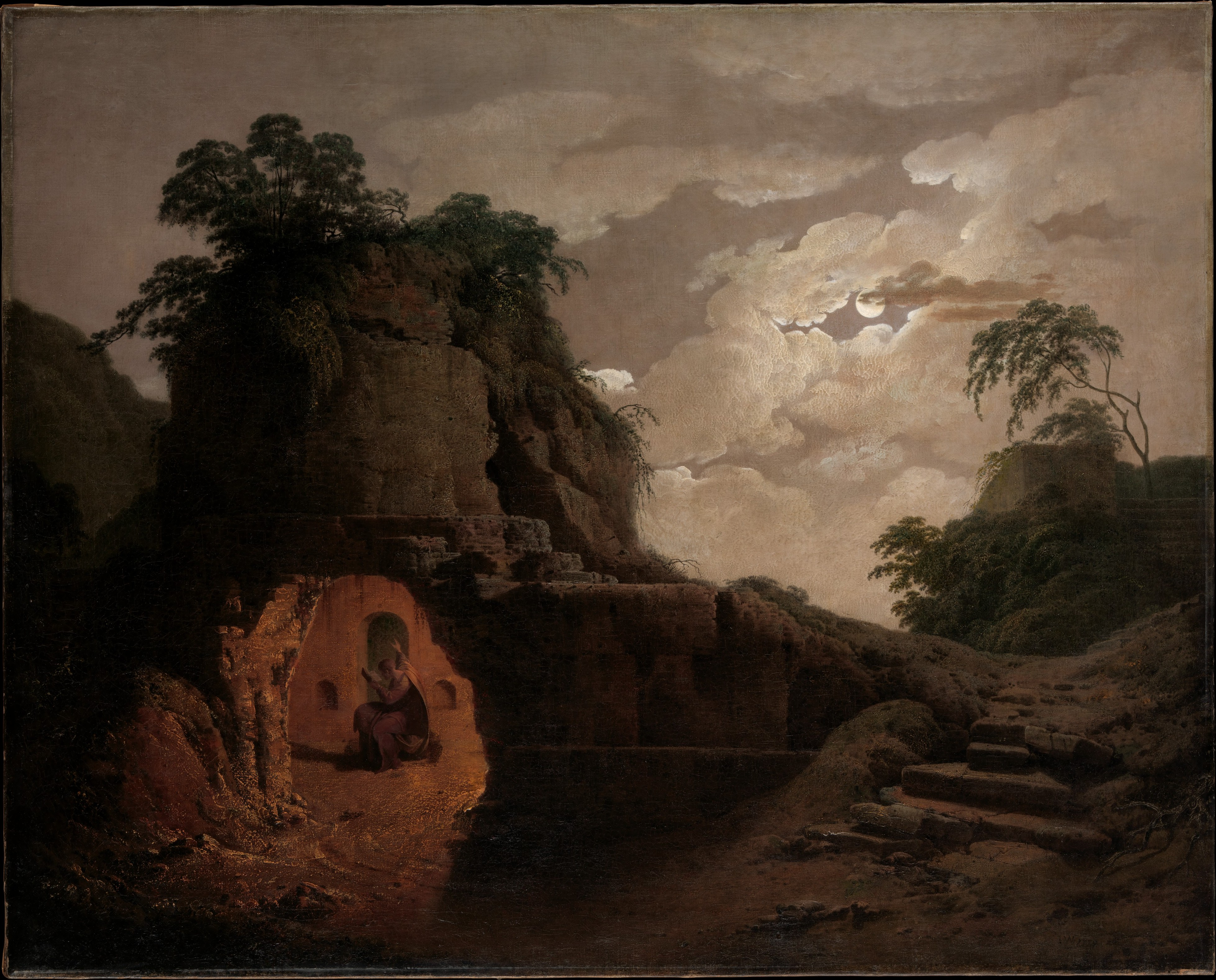
- Artist: Joseph Wright of Derby
- Year: 1779 (others 1782 and 1785)
- Medium: Oil on canvas
- Dimensions: 101.6 cm × 127 cm (40.0 in × 50 in)
- Location: Metropolitan Museum of Art

Virgil's Tomb is the title of at least three paintings completed by Joseph Wright of Derby between 1779 and 1785.

== Description ==
The subject of these paintings is a fruit of Wright's Italian tour undertaken in 1773–1775. These three depict the ruined structure near Naples that was traditionally identified as the tomb of the Latin epic poet Virgil. The earliest of the three, dated to 1779, includes the figure of Silius Italicus, a slightly later poet known to have been an admirer of Virgil. Silius Italicus owned the tomb and its surroundings and organized pilgrimages for other admirers of the poet.

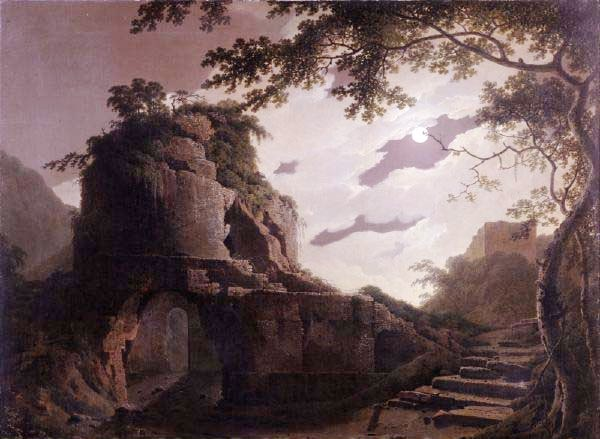
Virgil's Tomb: the 1782 version in Derby Museum and Art Gallery

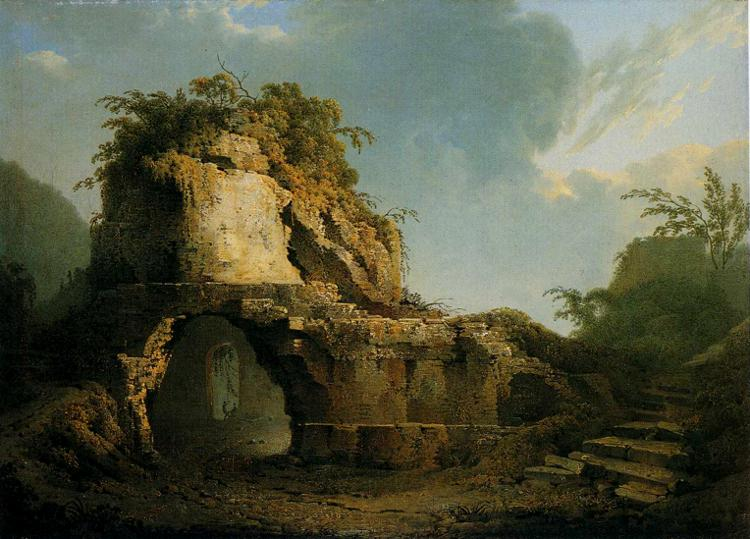
Virgil's Tomb: sun breaking through a cloud: the 1785 version in the Ulster Museum, Belfast

In total, Wright used the subject in seven paintings. He sent one of the paintings to poet William Hayley who returned the favour by writing Ode to Mr Wright of Derby.

Unlike Wright's paintings of candlelit scenes, the views of Virgil's tomb are "flooded with oppressive lunar light". They reflect from a stage of Wright's artistic development when "he held a delicate balance between what actually was there, and what he liked to construct out of what was there" .

== Provenance ==
One of the paintings was given to William Hayley who gave it to the artist Amelia Opie. When she died it went to Thomas Brightwall. Another of the paintings was reputedly in the possession of Rev. Thomas Gisborne whom Wright visited in his estate near Needwood Forest. This painting was owned by the Barton Blount estates in 1968 and by 1981 it was sold by Miss Ward to Derby Museum and Art Gallery for £12,000. The picture with Silius Italicus in Derby Museum is, according to Benedict Nicolson, not necessarily by Wright.

== Bibliography ==
- Benedict Nicolson, Joseph Wright of Derby: painter of light (1968) vol. 1 pp. 83–85 and passim
