= An Experiment on a Bird in the Air Pump =

1768 painting by Joseph Wright of Derby

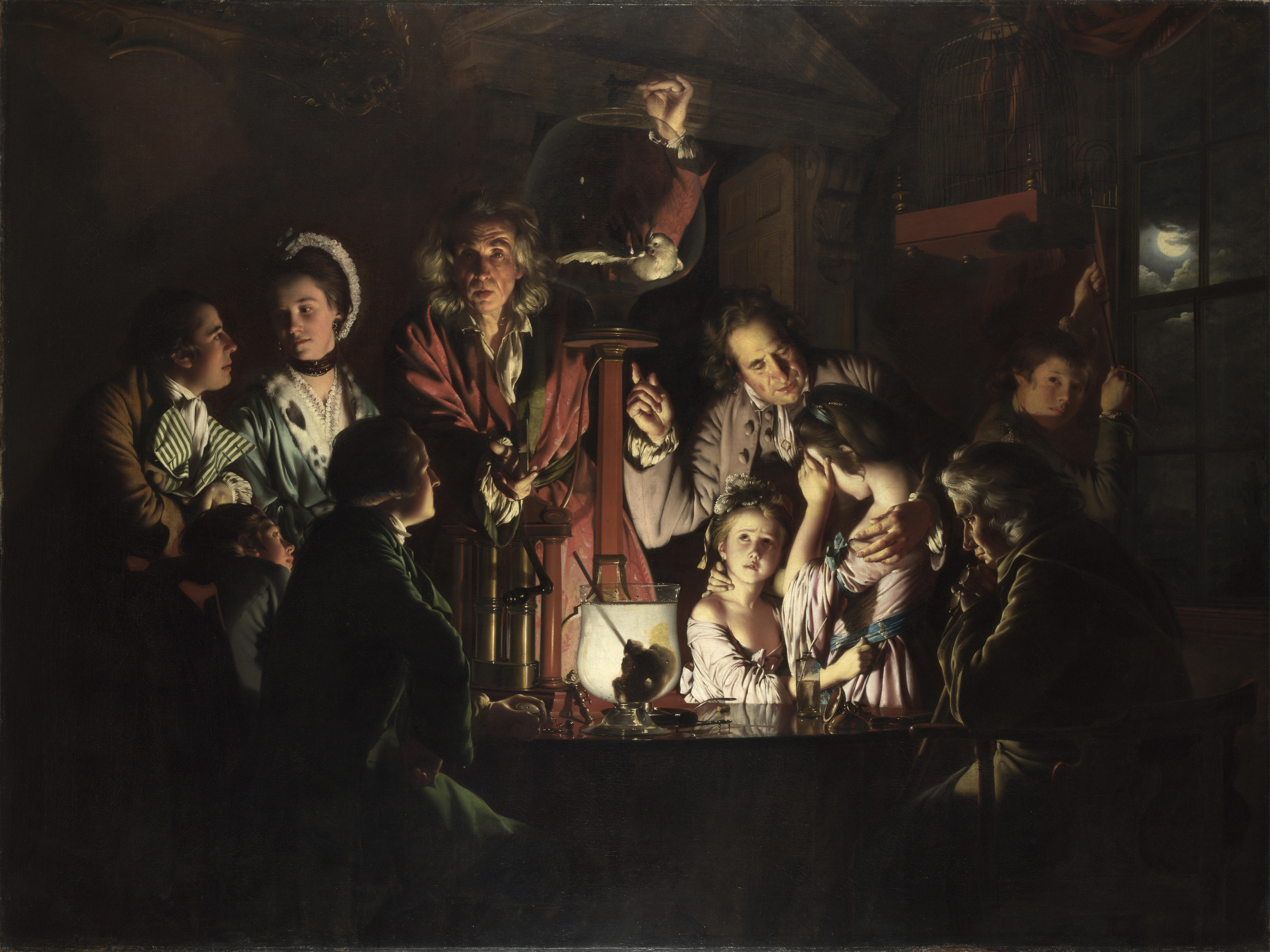
- Artist: Joseph Wright of Derby
- Year: 1768
- Medium: Oil on canvas
- Dimensions: 183 cm × 244 cm (72 in × 94 1/2 in)
- Location: National Gallery, London
- Accession: NG725

An Experiment on a Bird in the Air Pump is a 1768 oil-on-canvas painting by Joseph Wright of Derby, one of a number of candlelit scenes that Wright painted during the 1760s. The painting departed from convention of the time by depicting a scientific subject in the reverential manner formerly reserved for scenes of historical or religious significance. Wright was intimately involved in depicting the Industrial Revolution and the scientific advances of the Enlightenment. While his paintings were recognized as exceptional by his contemporaries, his provincial status and choice of subjects meant the style was never widely imitated. The picture has been owned by the National Gallery in London since 1863, and is regarded as a masterpiece of British art.

The painting depicts a natural philosopher, a forerunner of the modern scientist, recreating one of Robert Boyle's air pump experiments, in which a bird is deprived of air before a group of onlookers. The group members exhibit a variety of reactions, such as grief, disbelief, and dismay, but for most of the audience, scientific curiosity overcomes concern for the bird. The central figure looks out of the picture as if inviting the viewer's participation in the outcome.

The painting was featured in the 1980 BBC Two series 100 Great Paintings.

== Historical background ==
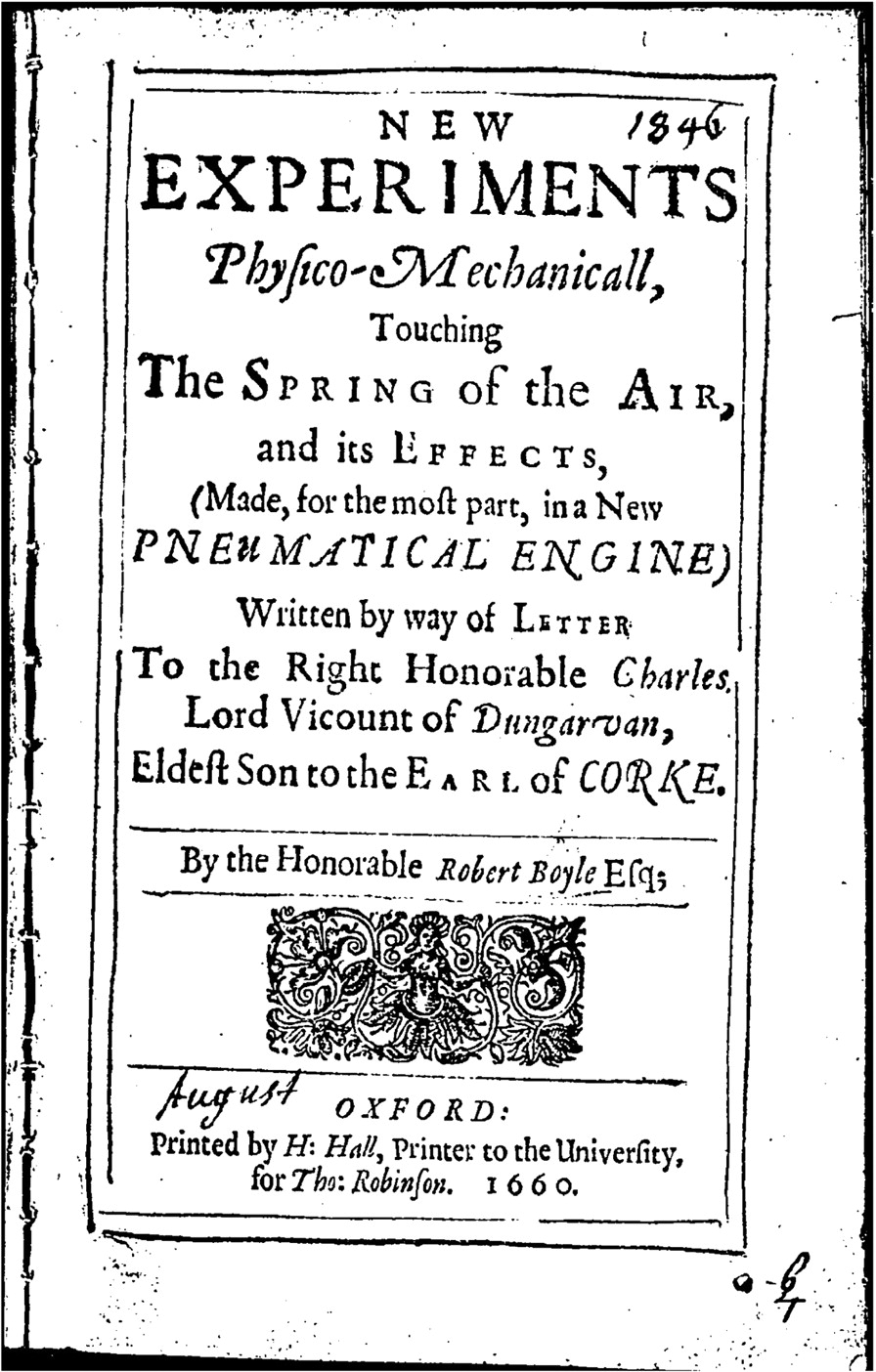
Title-page of Robert Boyle's New Experiments of 1660, in which he detailed how to perform the experiment.

In 1659, Robert Boyle commissioned the construction of an air pump, then described as a "pneumatic engine", which is known today as a "vacuum pump". The air pump was invented by Otto von Guericke in 1650, though its high cost deterred most contemporary scientists from constructing the apparatus. Boyle, the son of the Earl of Cork, had no such concerns—after its construction, he donated the initial 1659 model to the Royal Society, and had a further two redesigned machines built for his personal use. Aside from Boyle's three pumps, there were probably no more than four others in existence during the 1660s: Christiaan Huygens had one in The Hague, Henry Power may have had one at Halifax, and there may have been pumps at Christ's College, Cambridge, and the Montmor Academy in Paris. Boyle's pump, which was largely designed to Boyle's specifications and constructed by Robert Hooke, was complicated, temperamental, and problematic to operate. Many demonstrations could only be performed with Hooke on hand, and Boyle frequently left critical public displays solely to Hooke—whose dramatic flair matched his technical skill.

Despite the operational and maintenance obstacles, construction of the pump enabled Boyle to conduct a great many experiments on the properties of air, which he later detailed in his New Experiments Physico-Mechanicall, Touching the Spring of the Air, and its Effects, (Made, for the Most Part, in a New Pneumatical Engine). In the book, he described in great detail 43 experiments he conducted, with occasional assistance from Hooke, on the effect of air on various phenomena. Boyle tested the effects of "rarified" air on combustion, magnetism, sound, and barometers, and examined the effects of increased air pressure on various substances. He listed two experiments on living creatures: "Experiment 40", which tested the ability of insects to fly under reduced air pressure, and "Experiment 41," which demonstrated the reliance of living creatures on air for their survival. This attempt was intended to discover something "about the account upon which "respiration" is so necessary to the "animals" that Nature hath furnished with Lungs." Boyle conducted numerous trials, during which he placed a large variety of different creatures, including birds, mice, eels, snails, and flies, in the vessel of the pump and studied their reactions as the air was removed. Here, he describes an injured lark:

... the Bird for a while appear'd lively enough; but upon a greater Exsuction of the Air, she began manifestly to droop and appear sick, and very soon after was taken with as violent and irregular Convulsions, as are wont to be observ'd in Poultry, when their heads are wrung off: For the Bird threw her self over and over two or three times, and dyed with her Breast upward, her Head downwards, and her Neck awry.

By the time Wright painted his picture in 1768, air pumps were a relatively commonplace scientific instrument, and itinerant "lecturers in natural philosophy"—usually more showmen than scientists—often performed the "animal in the air pump experiment" as the centrepiece of their public demonstration. These were performed in town halls and other large buildings for a ticket-buying audience, or were booked by societies or for private showings in the homes of the well-off, the setting suggested in both of Wright's demonstration pieces. One of the most notable and respectable of the travelling lecturers was James Ferguson FRS, a Scottish astronomer and probable acquaintance of Joseph Wright (both were friends of John Whitehurst). Ferguson noted that a "lungs-glass" with a small air-filled bladder inside was often used in place of the animal, as using a living creature was "too shocking to every spectator who has the least degree of humanity".

The full moon in the picture is significant, as meetings of the Lunar Circle (renamed the Lunar Society by 1775) were timed to make use of its light when travelling.

Wright met Erasmus Darwin in the early 1760s, probably through their mutual connection, John Whitehurst. In 1767, Wright first consulted Darwin regarding health concerns, and stayed with the Darwin family for a week. The energy and vivacity of both Erasmus and Mary (Polly) Darwin impressed Wright. In the 1980s, Eric Evans (of the National Gallery) suggested that Darwin is the figure in the left foreground who holds a watch. As this composed timekeeper is not consistent with Darwin's flamboyant character, it is more likely that this is Dr William Small. The attention to timekeeping fits with Dr Small's role as the social secretary for the Lunar Circle. Small returned from Virginia in 1764, and established his practice in Birmingham in 1765, consistent with this being a meeting in 1767. The profile and wig of this figure are consistent with a contemporary portrait of Small by Tilly Kettle.

== Painting ==
=== Background ===
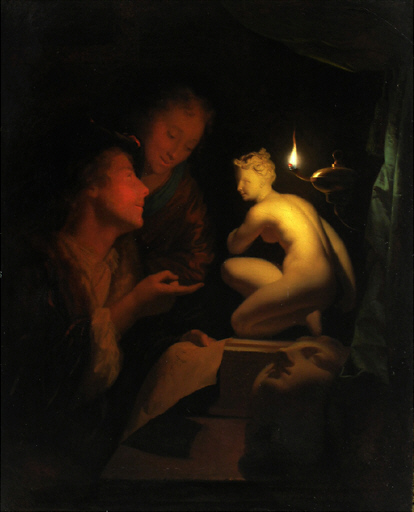
Candlelit scene (here with an oil lamp) by Godfried Schalcken, c. 1690

During his apprenticeship and early career, Wright concentrated on portraiture. By 1762, he was an accomplished portrait artist, and his 1764 group portrait, James Shuttleworth, his Wife and Daughter, is acknowledged as his first true masterpiece. British art historian Benedict Nicolson suggests that Wright was influenced by the work of Thomas Frye; particularly the 18 bust-length mezzotints which Frye completed just before his death in 1762. It was perhaps Frye's candlelight images that tempted Wright to experiment with subject pieces. Wright's first attempt, A Girl reading a Letter by Candlelight with a Young Man looking over her shoulder, from 1762 or 1763, is a trial in the genre, and is fetching though uncomplicated. Wright's An Experiment on a Bird in the Air Pump forms part of a series of candlelit nocturnes that he produced between 1765 and 1768.

There was a long history of painting candlelit scenes in Western art, although as Wright had not travelled abroad at this date, there remains uncertainty as to what paintings he might have seen in the original, as opposed to prints. Nicolson, who made studies of both Wright and other candlelight painters, such as the 17th-century Utrecht Caravaggisti, thought their paintings, among the largest in the style, those to be most likely to have influenced Wright. However, British art historian and curator Judy Egerton questions if Wright could have seen any, referring to influences of the far smaller works of the Leiden fijnschilder Godfried Schalcken (1643–1706), whose reputation was much greater in the early 18th century than later. Schalcken had worked in England from 1692 to 1697, and several of his paintings can be placed in English collections.

Although he was the leading expert writing in English, Nicolson does not suggest that Wright is likely to have known of the 17th-century candlelit narrative religious subjects of Georges de La Tour and Trophime Bigot, which, in their seriousness, are the closest works to Wright that are lit only by candle. The Dutch painters' works and other candlelit scenes by 18th-century English painters such as Henry Morland (father of George) tended instead to exploit the possibilities of semi-darkness for erotic suggestiveness. Some of Wright's own later candlelit scenes were by no means as serious as his first ones, as seen from their titles: Two Boys Fighting Over a Bladder and Two Girls Dressing a Kitten by Candlelight.

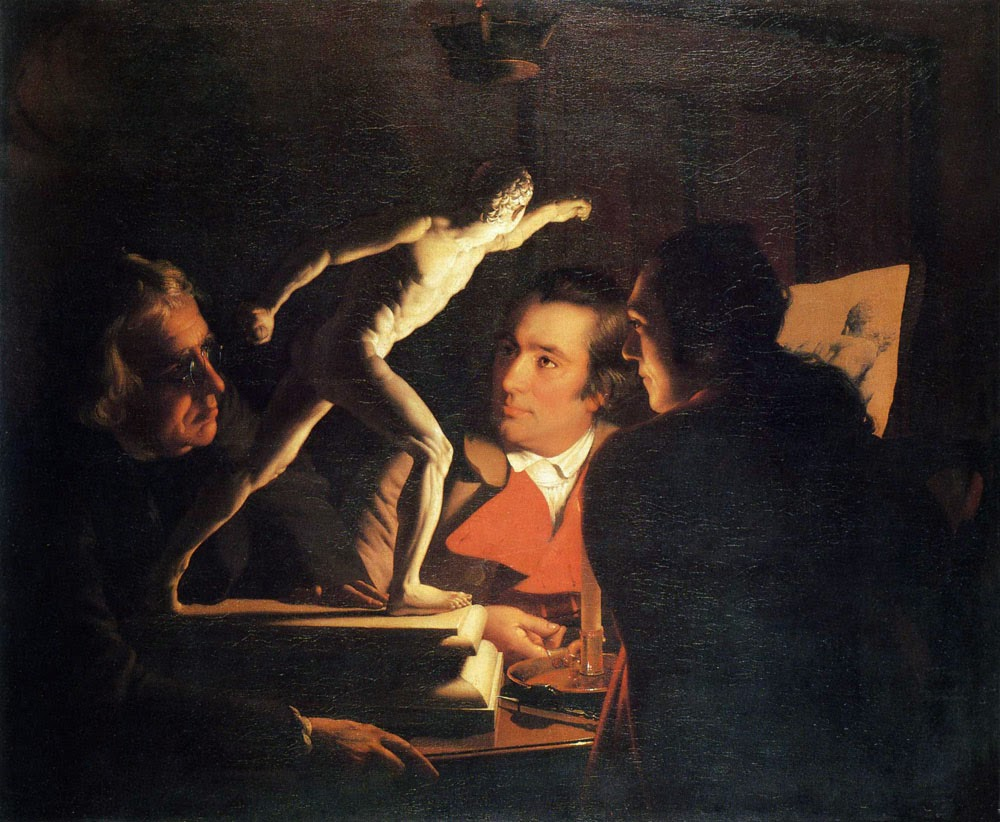
Three Persons Viewing the Gladiator by Candlelight (1765)

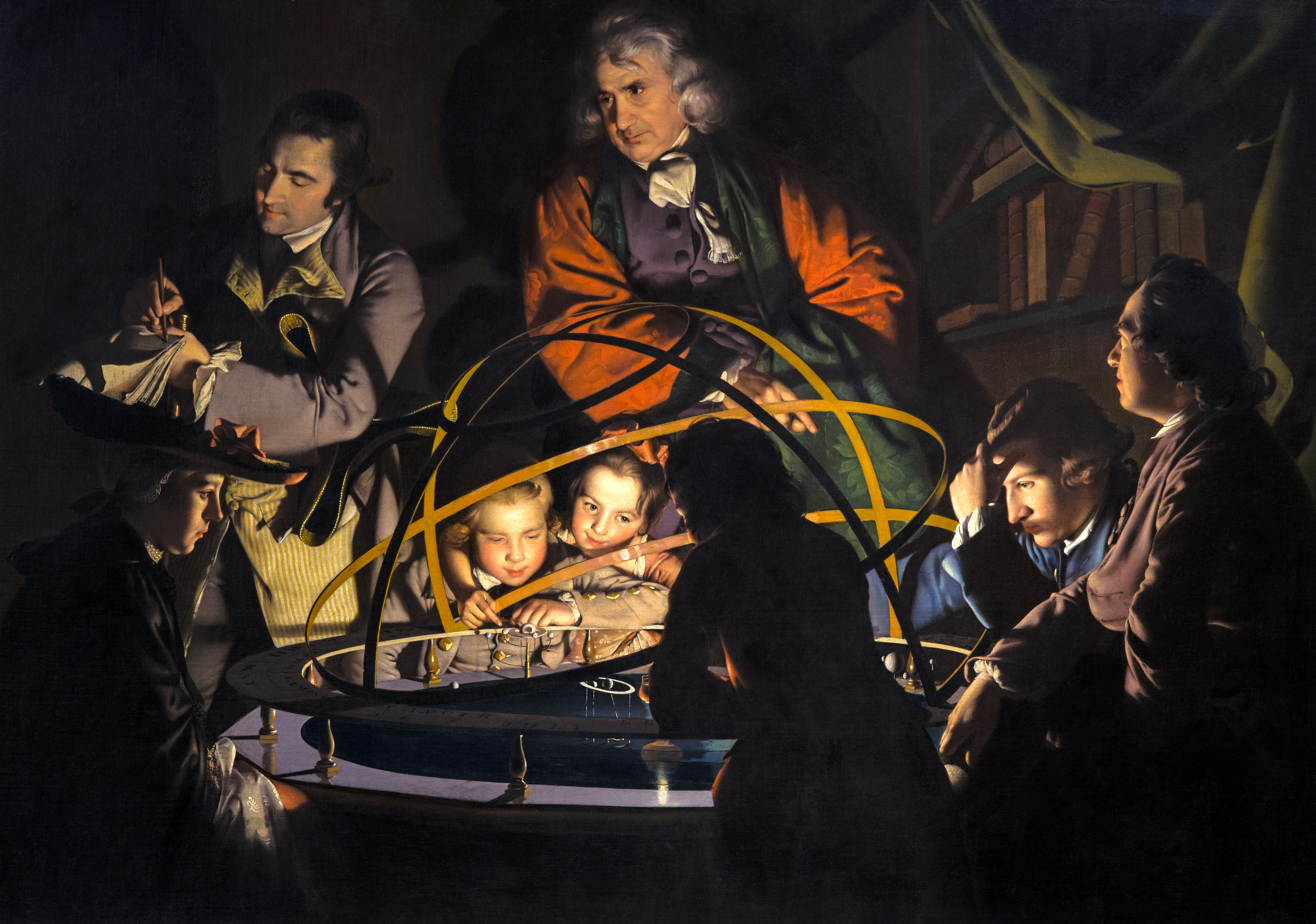
A Philosopher Lecturing on the Orrery (1768)

The first of his candlelit masterpieces, Three Persons Viewing the Gladiator by Candlelight, was painted in 1765, and showed three men studying a small copy of the "Borghese Gladiator". Viewing the Gladiator was greatly admired; but his next painting, A Philosopher giving that Lecture on the Orrery, in which a Lamp is put in place of the Sun (normally known by the shortened form A Philosopher Giving a Lecture on the Orrery or just The Orrery), caused a greater stir, as it replaced the Classical subject at the centre of the scene with one of a scientific nature. Wright's depiction of the awe produced by scientific "miracles" marked a break with traditions in which the artistic depiction of such wonder was reserved for religious events; to Wright, the marvels of the technological age were as awe-inspiring as the subjects of the great religious paintings.

In both of these works, the candlelit setting had a realist justification. Viewing sculpture by candlelight, when the contours showed well and there might even be an impression of movement from the flickering light, was a fashionable practice described by Goethe. In the orrery demonstration, the shadows cast by the lamp representing the sun were an essential part of the display, used to demonstrate eclipses. However, there seems no reason, other than heightened drama, to stage the air pump experiment in a room lit by a single candle, and the lighting is normal in two later paintings of the subject by Charles-Amédée-Philippe van Loo.

The painting was one of a number of British works challenging the set categories of the rigid, French-dictated hierarchy of genres in the late 18th century, as other types of painting aspired to be treated as seriously as the costumed history painting of a Classical or mythological subject. In some respects, the Orrery and Air Pump subjects resembled conversation pieces, then largely a form of middle-class portraiture, though soon to be given new status when Johann Zoffany began to paint the royal family in about 1766. Given their solemn atmosphere, however, and as it seems none of the figures are intended to be understood as portraits (even if models may be identified), the paintings can not be regarded as conversation pieces. The 20th-century art historian Ellis Waterhouse compares these two works to the "genre serieux" of contemporary French drama, as defined by Denis Diderot and Pierre Beaumarchais, a view endorsed by Egerton.

An anonymous review from the time called Wright "a very great and uncommon genius in a peculiar way." The Orrery was painted without a commission, probably in the expectation that it would be bought by Washington Shirley, 5th Earl Ferrers, an amateur astronomer who had an orrery of his own, and with whom Wright's friend, Peter Perez Burdett, was staying while in Derbyshire. Figures thought to be portraits of Burdett and Ferrers feature in the painting: Burdett taking notes, and Ferrers seated with his son next to the orrery. Ferrers purchased the painting for £210, but the 6th Earl sold it, and it is now in the Derby Museum and Art Gallery.

=== Detail ===
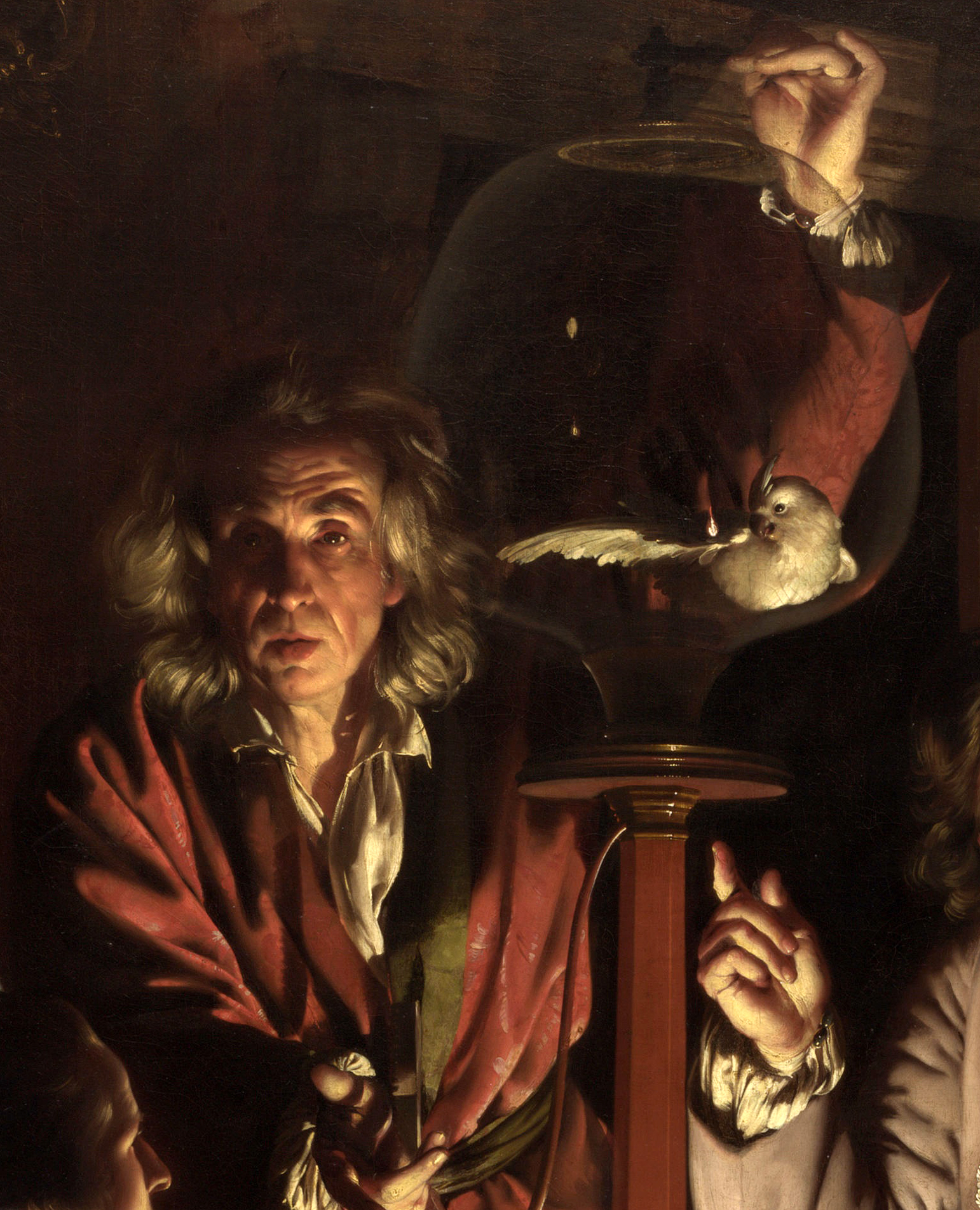
Detail from the painting

An Experiment on a Bird in the Air Pump followed in 1768, the emotionally charged experiment contrasting with the orderly scene from The Orrery. The painting, which measures 72 by 94½ inches (183 by 244 cm), shows a grey cockatiel fluttering in panic as the air is slowly withdrawn from the vessel by the pump. The witnesses display various emotions: one of the girls worriedly watches the fate of the bird, while the other is too upset to observe and is comforted by her father; two gentlemen (one of them dispassionately timing the experiment) and a boy look on with interest, while the young lovers to the left of the painting are absorbed only in each other. The scientist himself looks directly out of the picture, as if challenging the viewer to judge whether the pumping should continue, killing the bird, or whether the air should be replaced and the cockatiel saved.

David Solkin suggests that little sympathy is directed toward the bird; the subjects of the painting show the dispassionate detachment of the evolving scientific society. Individuals are concerned for each other: the father for his children, the young man for the girl, but the distress of the cockatiel elicits only careful study. Another reading is that interest in the bird increases from the left side to the right; viewers on the left are scientifically interested (older men and boy) or distracted (young lovers), while those on the right are concerned (girls, older man, assistant) or attending to those who are (father). To one side of the boy assistant at the right side in the rear, the cockatiel's empty cage can be seen on the wall, and to further heighten the drama, it is unclear whether the boy is lowering the cage on the pulley to allow the bird to be replaced after the experiment, or hoisting the cage back up—certain of its former occupant's death. It has also been suggested that he may be drawing the curtains to block out the light from the full moon.

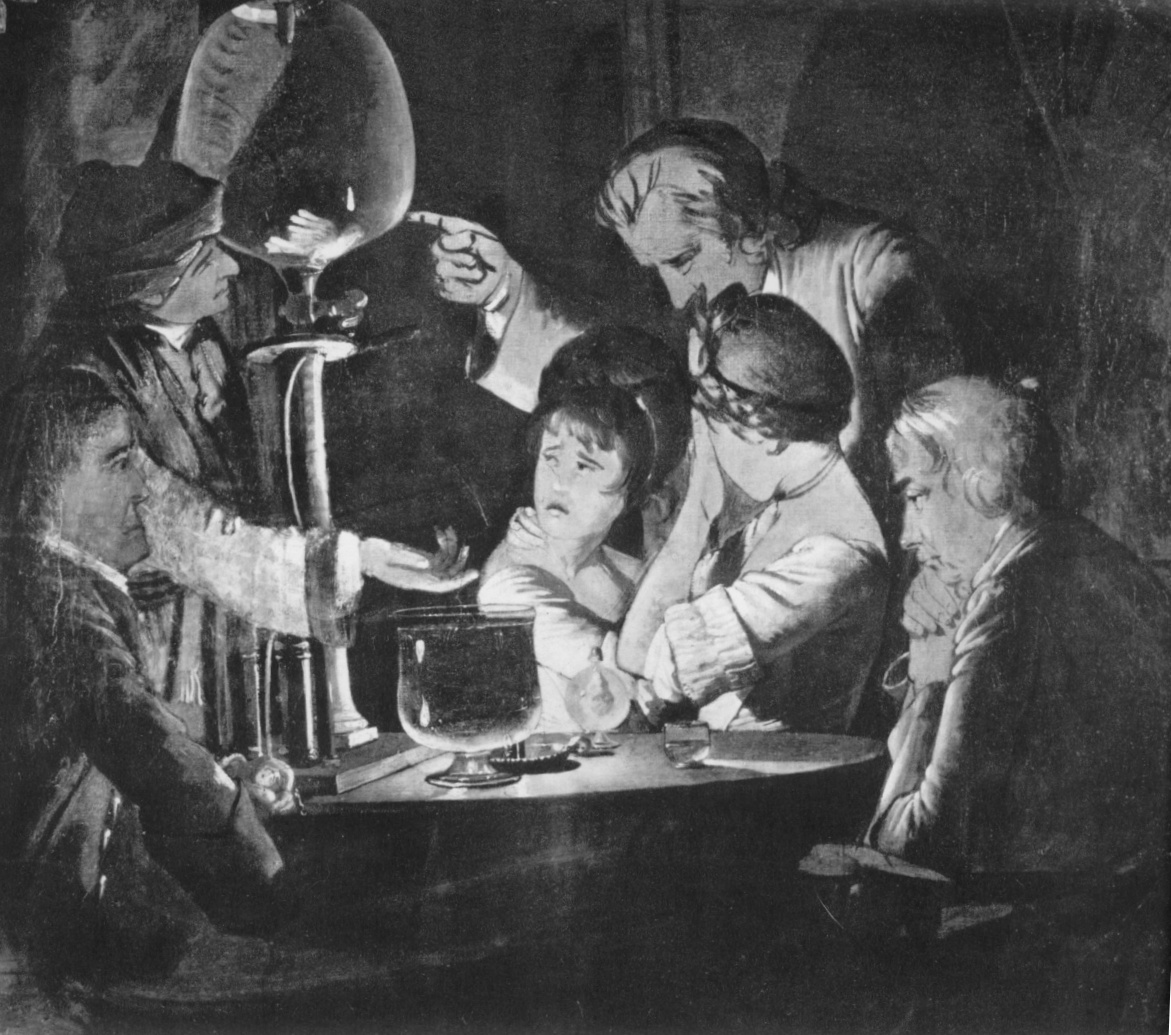
An earlier oil sketch showed the demonstrator in a more reassuring pose. The bird here was a common songbird.

The biographer and critic Jenny Uglow believes that the boy echoes the figure in the last print of William Hogarth's The Four Stages of Cruelty, by pointing out the arrogance and potential cruelty of experimentation, while David Fraser also sees the compositional similarities with the audience grouped round a central demonstration. The neutral stance of the central character and the uncertain intentions of the boy with the cage were both later ideas: an early study, discovered on the back of a self-portrait, omits the boy and shows the natural philosopher reassuring the girls. In this sketch, the bird’s survival is apparent, and thus the composition lacks the power of the final version. British/Canadian professor and artist Lochlann Jain has analyzed the painting in the context of a contemporary cultural history and medicine of human suffocation and choking. Wright, who took many of his subjects from English poetry, probably knew the following passage from "The Wanderer" (1729) by Richard Savage:

So in some Engine, that denies a Vent,
If unrespiring is some Creature pent,
It sickens, droops, and pants, and gasps for Breath,
Sad o'er the Sight swim shad'wy Mists of Death;
If then kind Air pours powerful in again.
New Heats, new Pulses quicken ev'ry Vein;
From the clear'd, lifted, life-rekindled Eye,
Dispers'd, the dark and dampy Vapours fly.

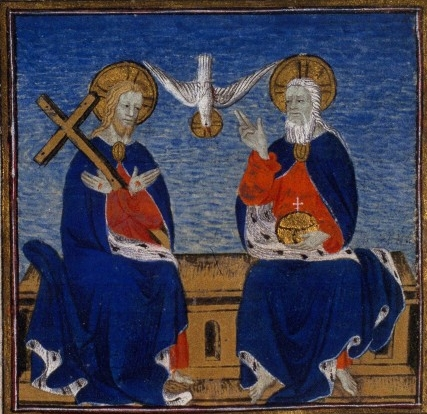
The figures beside the bird have been compared to some late medieval Trinities.

The cockatiel would have been a rare bird at the time, "and one whose life would never in reality have been risked in an experiment such as this". Cockatiels did not become well known until after it was shown in illustrations to the accounts of the voyages of Captain Cook in the 1770s. Prior to Cook's voyage, cockatiels had been imported only in small numbers as exotic cage-birds. Wright had painted one in 1762 at the home of William Chase, featuring it both in his portrait of Chase and his wife (Mr & Mrs William Chase) and a separate study, The Parrot. In selecting such a rarity for this scientific sacrifice, Wright not only chose a more dramatic subject than the "lungs-glass", but was perhaps making a statement about the values of society in the Age of Enlightenment. The grey plumage of the cockatiel also shows much more effectively in the darkened room than the small, dull-coloured bird in Wright's early oil sketch. A resemblance has been pointed out between the group of the bird and the two nearest figures and a type of depiction of the Trinity found in Early Netherlandish painting, where the Holy Spirit is represented by a dove, to which God the Father (the philosopher) points, while Christ (the father) gestures in blessing to the viewer.

On the table are various other pieces of equipment that the natural philosopher would have used during his demonstration: a thermometer, candle snuffer, and cork, and close to the man seated to the right is a pair of Magdeburg hemispheres, which would have been used with the air pump to demonstrate the difference in pressure exerted by the air and a vacuum: when the air was pumped out from between the two hemispheres, they were impossible to pull apart. The air pump itself is rendered in exquisite detail, a faithful record of the designs in use at the time. What may be a human skull in the large, liquid-filled glass bowl would not have been a normal piece of equipment; William Schupbach suggests that it and the candle, which is presumably lighting the bowl from behind, form a vanitas—the two symbols of mortality reflecting the cockatiel's struggle for life.

=== Style ===
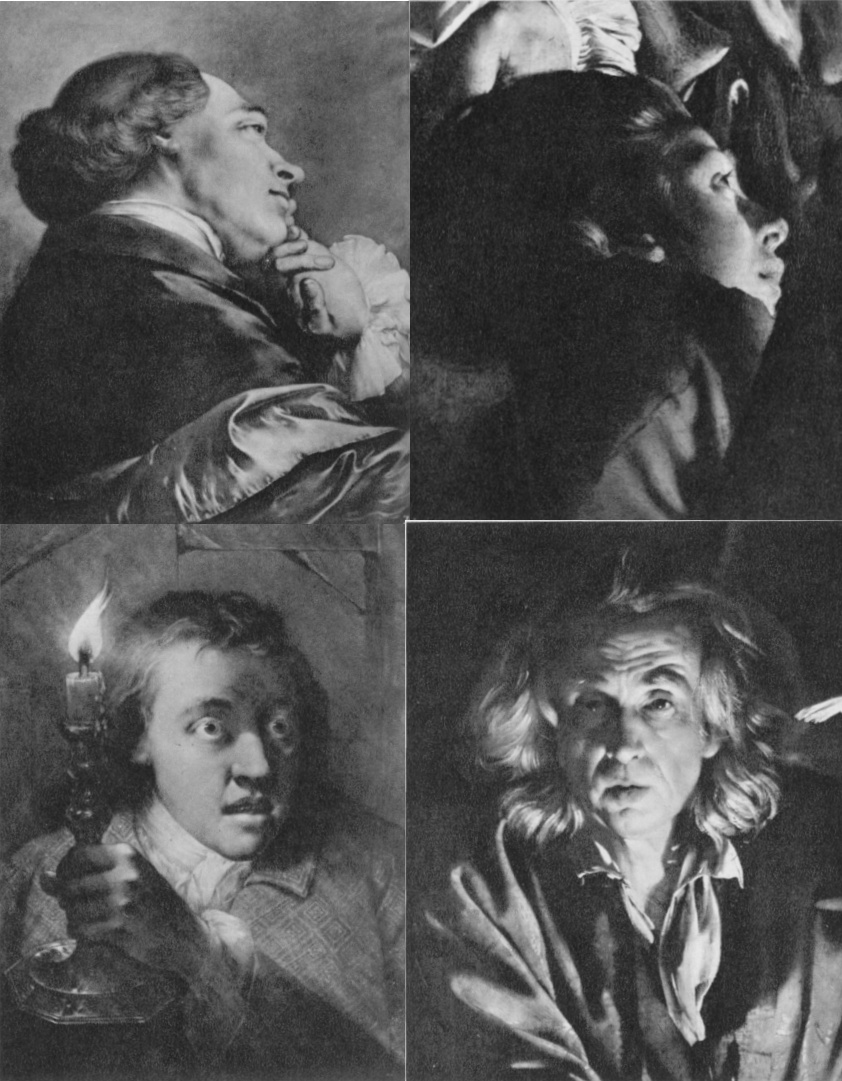
Frye's mezzotint figures (left) are thought to have inspired those of Wright (right).

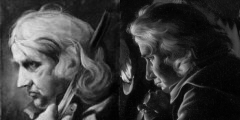
Frye's chalk drawing (left) was obviously the inspiration for this observer (right).

The powerful central light source creates a chiaroscuro effect. The light illuminating the scene has been described as "so brilliant it could only be the light of revelation". The single source of light is obscured behind the bowl on the table; some hint of a lamp glass can be seen around the side of the bowl, but British artist David Hockney has suggested that the bowl itself may contain Sulphur, giving a powerful single light source that a candle or oil lamp would not. In the earlier study, a candle holder is visible, and the flame is reflected in the bowl. Hockney believes that many of the Old Masters used optical equipment to assist in their painting, and suggests that Wright may have used lenses to transfer the image to paper rather than painting directly from the scene, as he believes the pattern of shadows thrown by the lighting could have been too complicated for Wright to have captured so accurately without assistance. It may be observed, however, that the stand on which the pump is situated casts no shadow on the body of the philosopher, as it could be expected to do.

Wright's Air Pump was unusual in that it depicted archetypes rather than specific people, though various models for the figures have been suggested. The young lovers may have been based on Thomas Coltman and Mary Barlow, friends of Wright's, whom he later painted in Mr and Mrs Thomas Coltman (also in the National Gallery) after their marriage in 1769; Erasmus Darwin has been suggested as the man timing the experiment on the left of the table, and John Warltire, whom Darwin had invited to help with some air pump experiments in real life, as the natural philosopher; but Wright never identified any of the subjects or suggested they were based on real people.

In The Orrery, all the subjects have been identified apart from the philosopher, who has physical similarities to Isaac Newton, but differs enough to make positive identification impossible. Nicolson detects the strong influence of Frye throughout the picture. Particularly striking is the similarity between Frye's mezzotint Portrait of a Young Man of 1760–1761 and the figure of the boy with his head cocked staring intently at the bird. In 1977, Michael Wynne published one of Frye's chalk drawings from around 1760, An old man leaning on a staff, which is so similar to the observer in the right foreground in Wright's picture to make it impossible that Wright had not seen it. There are other hints of Frye's style in the painting: even the figure of the natural philosopher has touches of Frye's Figure with Candle. Though Henry Fuseli would later also develop on the style of Frye's work there is no evidence of him having painted anything similar until the early 1780s. So, although he had already been in England at the time the Air Pump was produced, it is unlikely that he was an influence on Wright.

Wright's scientific paintings adopted elements from the tradition of history painting but lacked the heroic central action typical of that genre. While ground-breaking, they are regarded as peculiar to Wright, whose unique style has been explained in many ways. Wright's provincial status and ties to the Lunar Society, a group of prominent industrialists, scientists and intellectuals who met regularly in Birmingham between 1765 and 1813, have been highlighted, as well as his close association with and sympathy for the advances made in the burgeoning Industrial Revolution. Other critics have emphasised a desire to capture a snapshot of the society of the day, in the tradition of William Hogarth but with a more neutral stance that lacks the biting satire of Hogarth's work.

== Reception and provenance ==
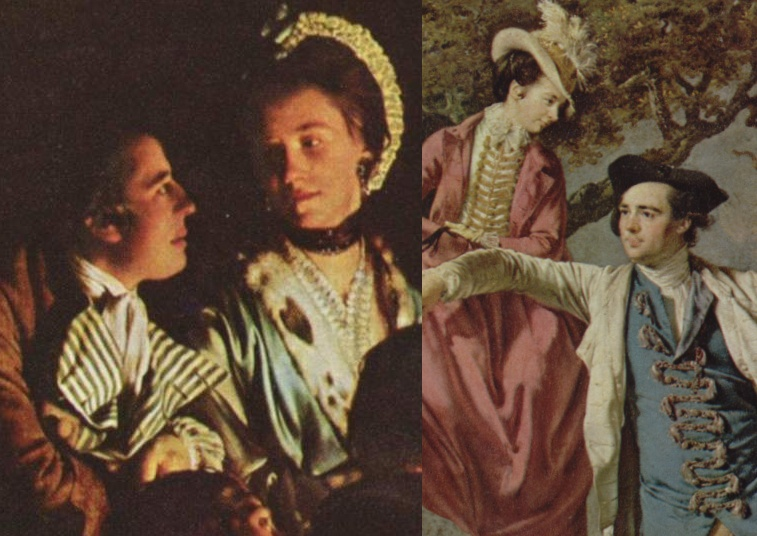
Mr and Mrs Thomas Coltman may have been the model for the two lovers.

The scientific subjects of Wright's paintings from this time were meant to appeal to the wealthy scientific circles in which he moved. While never a member himself, he had strong connections with the Lunar Society: he was friends with members John Whitehurst and Erasmus Darwin, as well as Josiah Wedgwood, who later commissioned paintings from him. The inclusion of the moon in the painting was a nod to their monthly meetings, which were held when the moon was full. Like The Orrery, Wright apparently painted Air Pump without a commission, and the picture was purchased by Dr Benjamin Bates, who already owned Wright's Gladiator. An Aylesbury physician, patron of the arts and hedonist, Bates was a diehard member of the Hellfire Club. Wright's account book shows a number of prices for the painting: P^{d}£200 is shown in one place and £210 in another, but Wright had written to Bates asking for £130, stating that the low price "might much injure me in the future sale of my pictures, and when I send you a receipt for the money I shall acknowledge a greater sum." Whether Bates ever paid the full amount is not recorded; Wright only notes in his account book that he received £30 in part payment.

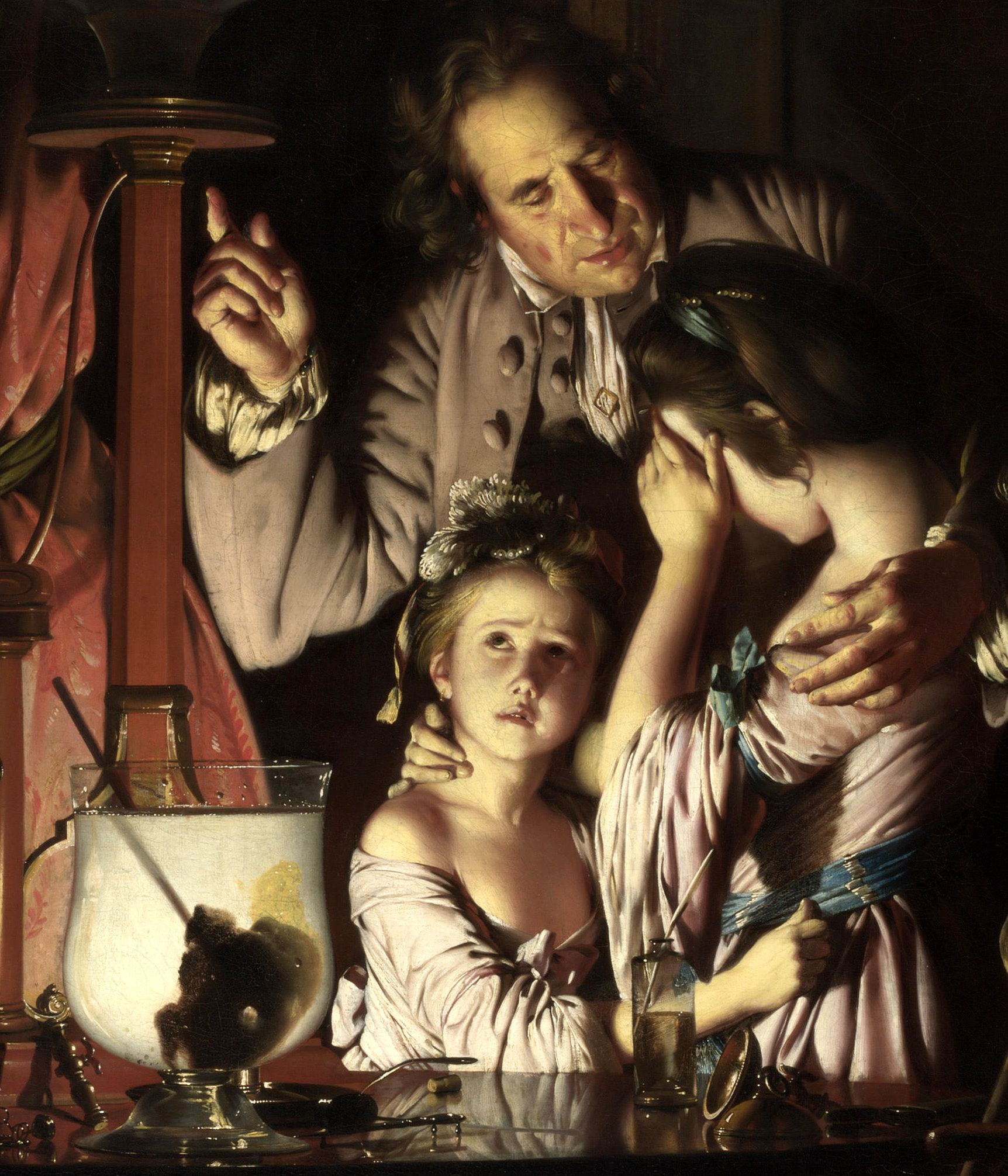
Detail of the painting

Wright exhibited the painting at the Society of Artists Exhibition of 1768 and Christian VII of Denmark was shown it in September the same year. Viewers remarked that it was "clever and vigorous", while Gustave Flaubert, who saw it on a visit to England between 1865 and 1866, considered it "charming in naivety and depth". It was popular enough that a mezzotint was engraved from it by Valentine Green which was published by John Boydell on 24 June 1769, and initially sold for 15 shillings. This was reprinted throughout the 18th and 19th centuries, in increasingly weak impressions. Ellis Waterhouse called it "one of the wholly original masterpieces of British art".

From Bates, the picture passed to Walter Tyrell; another member of the Tyrell family, Edward, presented it to the National Gallery, London in 1863, after it had failed to sell at an auction at Christie's in 1854. The painting was transferred to the Tate Gallery in 1929, although it was on loan to Derby Museum and Art Gallery between 1912 and 1947. It has been lent out for exhibitions to the National Gallery of Art in Washington, D.C., in 1976, the National Museum of Fine Arts in Stockholm in 1979–1980, and Paris (Grand Palais), New York (Metropolitan) and the Tate in London in 1990. It was reclaimed by the National Gallery from the Tate in 1986. They describe its condition as good, with minor alterations visible on some figures. It was last cleaned in 1974. In 2025, it was the subject of its own exhibition at the National Gallery entitled Wright of Derby: From the Shadows. That exhibit prompted a BBC Online article weighing whether it could be considered the first work of modern art.

The striking scene has been used as the cover illustration for many books on topics both artistic and scientific. It has even spawned pastiches and parodies: the book cover of The Science of Discworld, by Terry Pratchett, Ian Stewart and Jack Cohen, is a tribute to the painting by artist Paul Kidby, who replaces Wright's figures with the book's protagonists. Shelagh Stephenson's play An Experiment with an Air Pump, inspired by the painting, was the joint winner of the 1997 Margaret Ramsay Award and had its premiere at the Royal Exchange Theatre, Manchester, in 1998.
