= The Memory of Water =

Comedy written by Shelagh Stephenson

- Original language: English
- Written by: Shelagh Stephenson
- Subject: Three sisters and their partners gather at the home of their recently dead mother and revisit the past in poignant and often hilarious way
- Genre: Comedy

Premiere
- Date: 1996
- Place: Hampstead Theatre; London

The Memory of Water is a comedy written by English playwright Shelagh Stephenson, first staged at Hampstead Theatre in 1996. It won the 2000 Laurence Olivier Award for Best New Comedy.

== Characters ==
=== Vi ===
Vi is the mother of the three sisters, for whose funeral they have gathered. She was a glamorous woman when younger, with whom all the men of the village were enamoured. She was perhaps not the best of mothers, not teaching her daughters about sex or about being a woman, which culminated in Mary's becoming a teenaged mother.

=== Mary ===
Mary is the middle child. Mary is a doctor whose five-year affair with Mike, a married doctor, is starting to show strain. She experiences a series of interactions with her mother's ghost, whereupon she discusses memory and their relationship. The audience is unsure whether the other sisters are privy to this relationship, as it is hinted that Vi visits all of them. Mary had a child at fourteen that she gave up (named Patrick) and this comes to light later in the play. Her life revolves around creating a memory of him, which she divests into a coma patient suffering from amnesia in which she is treating (imagining that he is Patrick) and if she can wake him she can awaken her own son from their estrangement. Patrick is dead, but Teresa has hidden this news from her sister, as it seems it is the most contentious issue for the family and its upholding of family pride. When Mary discovers Patrick is dead, it proves both healing and problematic for the sisters.

=== Teresa ===
Teresa she is the eldest sister and an unhappy housewife, who runs a health food supplement store with her husband Frank, and who feels she has had to keep the family together for years. She assumes much of the responsibility for the funeral arrangements and her mother's care once deterioration into Alzheimer's commences. It is clear that she feels both resentful and protective of her younger siblings. She met her husband by whittling down responses she received to a singles advert, believing this to be the best way of finding her future partner, but both she and Frank discovered that they were not as they had described themselves.

=== Catherine ===
Catherine is the youngest sister, and the only sister who does not have a partner, whilst Mary's and Teresa's partners make an appearance at the funeral preparations. Catherine is permanently trying to catch her sisters' attention and feels she was always left out, even in childhood, and even now is unaware of Mary's son. Her sisters remain dismissive of her current romantic attachment, as Catherine changes her lovers regularly, (it is indicated that this is not necessarily her own choice) and is fairly self-obsessed. She enters loaded with shopping bags, and appears to have a limited attention span as her topics of conversation change with alacrity. She offers marijuana to the guests, which Teresa accepts, and indulges in drinking with her sisters; though she seems to be the most rebellious sister, Catherine is the most lively of the three. She has a vivid imagination but is more similar to her siblings than she realises. She seeks attention, claiming that she never had as much as her sisters did growing up. Throughout the play she refers to this often. Catherine feels very dismissed and a lot of things put down on her.

=== Mike ===
Mike is the doctor with whom Mary has been having a 5-year relationship. He has told Mary that his wife has ME, but during the play Mary finds a picture in a magazine of his wife in perfect health. Mike has no desire to have a child with Mary, which puts strain on their relationship.

=== Frank ===
Frank is Teresa's husband and runs the health food supplement store with her. He isn't satisfied by doing a job which he doesn't believe in nor care about. When he tells Teresa he wants to change his career path and open a pub she objects.

== Plot summary ==
Three sisters, Teresa, Mary, and Catherine, gather before their mother's funeral, each haunted by her own demons. The play focusses on how each sister deals with the death and how it directly affects her. The three each have different memories of the same events, causing constant bickering about whose memories are true. As the three women meet after years of separation, all their hidden lies and self-betrayals are about to reach the surface.

A theme of the play is, eponymously, memory. The sisters' memories interact with each other, and show that despite synchronicities of time and place they cannot agree upon one unifying experience. This is echoed in Vi's final speech, which portrays Alzheimer's disease as being adrift among a series of islands of your own identity. The sisters drift around their own islands of memory, unable to agree on one particular point, and yet are unified by their familial bond (Vi comments that "some things stay in your bones").

The play exhibits the unity of time, place, and character present in a tragedy, as the play seems to take place at one time, in one space, and without change in the characters' outlooks. However, because the comedy is so often interspersed with the tragic, it may be considered a tragi-comedy.

== Film adaptation ==
The play was adapted by Stephenson for the 2002 film, Before You Go, directed by Lewis Gilbert, starring, Julie Walters, John Hannah, and Joanne Whalley.
