= Peter Mark Roget =

British physician, philologist and theologian (1779–1869)

Peter Mark Roget LRCP FRS FRCP FGS FRAS
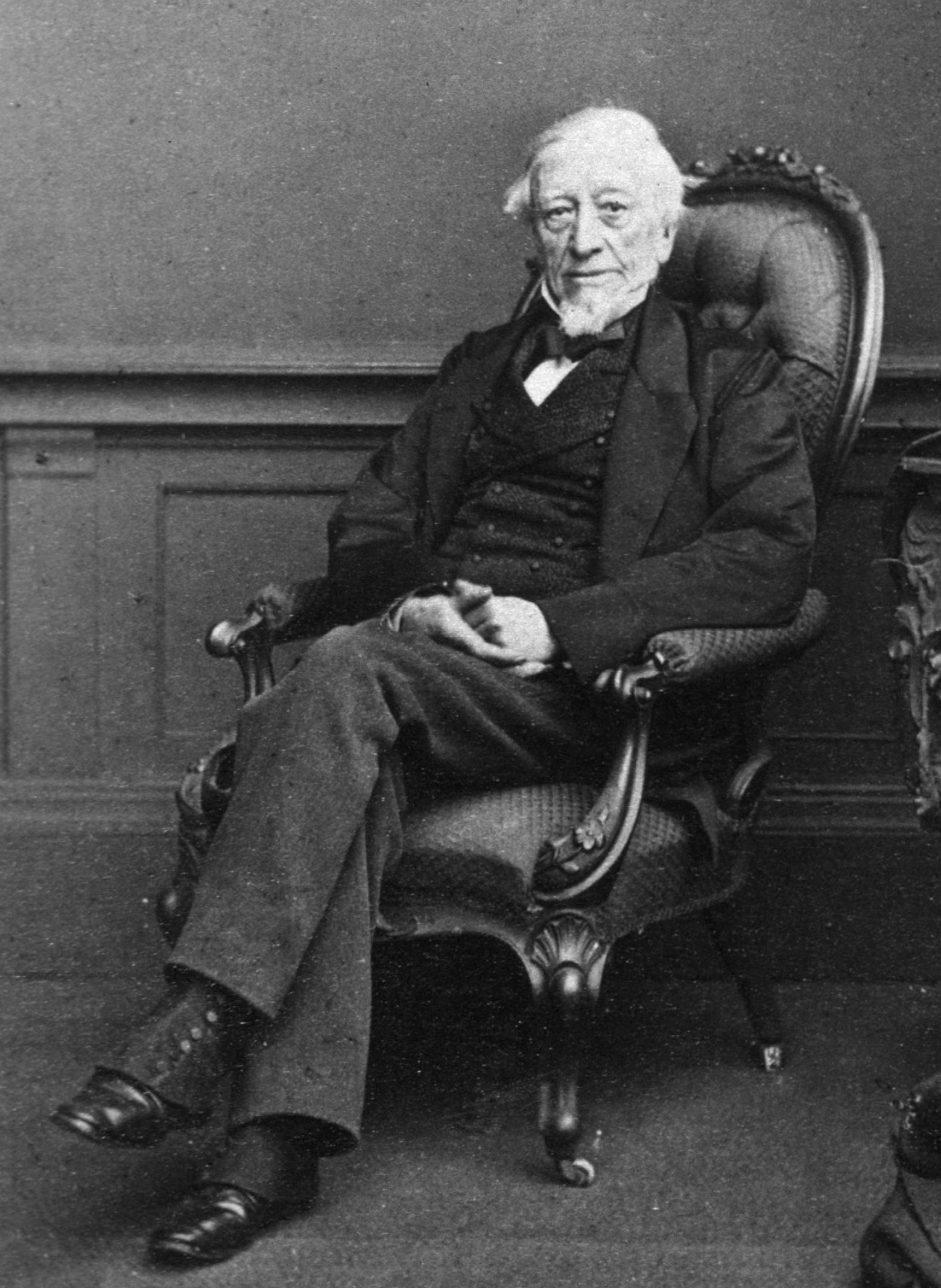
- Roget c. 1865
- Born: 18 January 1779; Soho, London, England
- Died: 12 September 1869 (aged 90); West Malvern, England
- Education: University of Edinburgh
- Known for: Thesaurus of English Words and Phrases
- Spouse: Mary Taylor Hobson (m. 1824; died 1833)
- Children: 2

Peter Mark Roget (UK: /ˈrɒʒeɪ/ US: /roʊˈʒeɪ/; 18 January 1779 – 12 September 1869) was a British physician, natural theologian, lexicographer, and founding secretary of The Portico Library. He is best known for publishing, in 1852, the Thesaurus of English Words and Phrases, a classified collection of related words (thesaurus). In 1824, he read a paper to the Royal Society about a peculiar optical illusion which is often (falsely) regarded as the origin of the ancient persistence of vision theory that was later commonly, yet incorrectly, used to explain apparent motion in film and animation.

== Early life ==
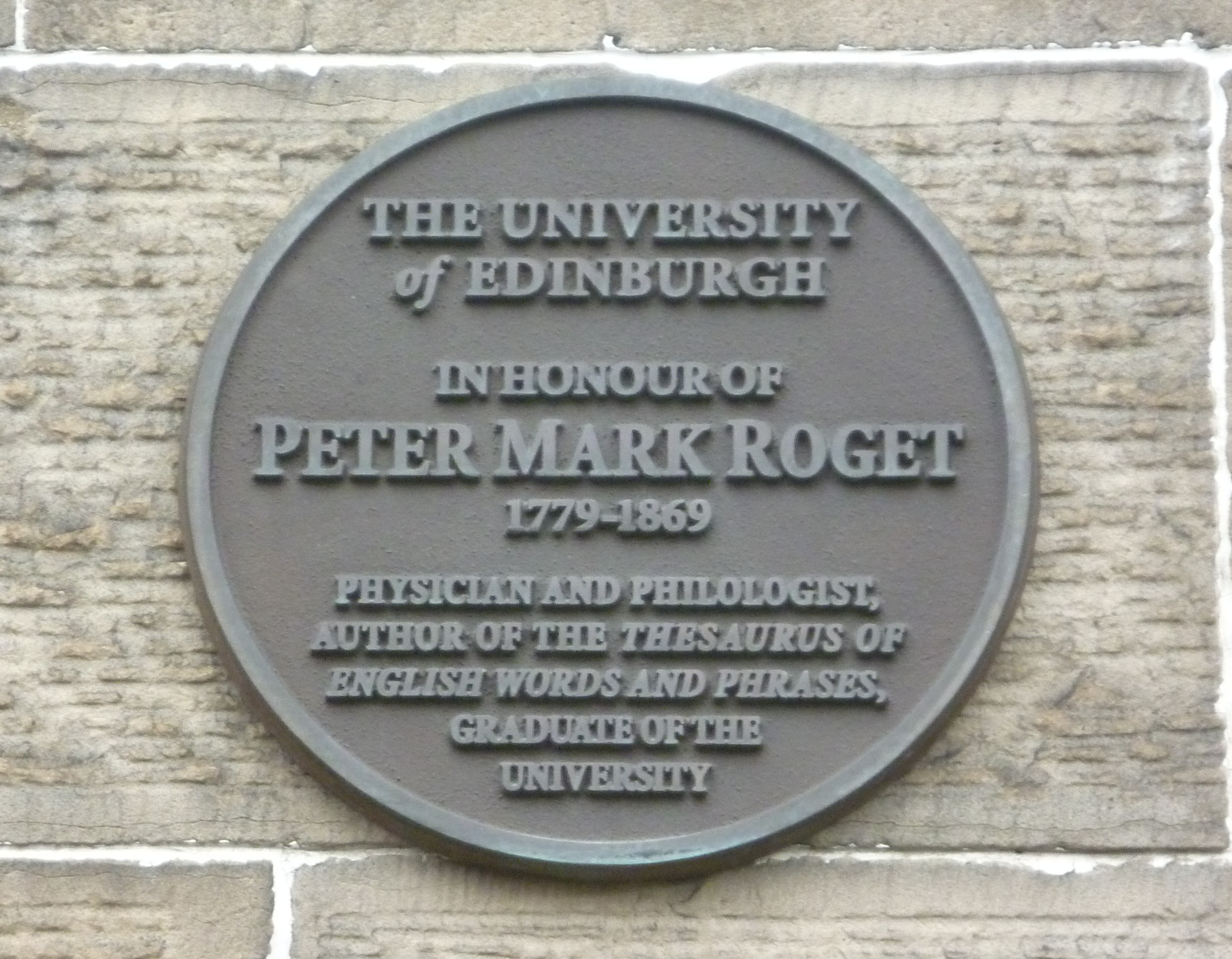
Roget plaque, George Square, Edinburgh

Peter Mark Roget was born in Broad Street, Soho, London, the son of Jean (John) Roget (1751–1783), a Genevan cleric born to French parents, and Catherine "Kitty" Romilly, the sister of British politician, abolitionist, and legal reformer Sir Samuel Romilly. His parents were French Huguenots. Following his father's death, the family moved to Edinburgh in 1783 where Roget later studied medicine at the University of Edinburgh, graduating in 1798, with a thesis titled "De chemicae affinitatis legibus" ("On the Laws of Chemical Affinity"). Samuel Romilly, who took on the role of surrogate father to Roget and supported his nephew's education, also introduced him into Whig social circles.

Roget then attended lectures at London medical schools. Living in Clifton, Bristol, from 1798 to 1799, he knew Thomas Beddoes and Humphry Davy and frequented the Pneumatic Institute.

Not making a quick start to a medical career, in 1802 Roget took a position as a tutor to the sons of John Leigh Philips, with whom he began a Grand Tour during the Peace of Amiens, travelling with a friend, Lovell Edgeworth, son of Richard Lovell Edgeworth. When the Peace abruptly ended he was detained as a prisoner in Geneva. He was able to bring his pupils back to England in late 1803, but Edgeworth was held in captivity until Napoleon fell on 6 April 1814.

== Medical career ==
With the help of Samuel Romilly, Roget became a private physician to William Petty, 1st Marquess of Lansdowne, who died in 1805. He then succeeded Thomas Percival at Manchester Infirmary and began to lecture on physiology. He moved to London in 1808 and in 1809 became a licentiate of the Royal College of Physicians. After an extended period of dispensary work and lecturing, in particular, at the Russell Institution and Royal Institution, he joined the staff of the Queen Charlotte Hospital in 1817. He also lectured at the London Institution and the Windmill Street School.

In 1823 Roget and Peter Mere Latham were brought in to investigate disease at Millbank Penitentiary. In 1828 Roget, with William Thomas Brande and Thomas Telford, submitted a report on London's water supply. In 1834 he became the first Fullerian Professor of Physiology at the Royal Institution. One of those who helped found the University of London in 1837, he was an examiner in physiology there. He gave up medical practice in 1840.

== Thesaurus ==
Roget retired from professional life in 1840, and by 1846 was working on the book that perpetuates his memory today. It has been claimed that Roget struggled with depression for most of his life, and that the thesaurus arose partly from an effort to battle it. A biographer stated that his obsession with list-making as a coping mechanism was well established by the time Roget was eight years old. In 1805, he began to maintain a notebook classification scheme for words, organized by meaning. During this period he also moved to Manchester, where he became the first secretary of the Portico Library.

The catalogue of words was first printed in 1852, titled Thesaurus of English Words and Phrases Classified and Arranged so as to Facilitate the Expression of Ideas and Assist in Literary Composition. During Roget's lifetime, the work had twenty-eight printings. After his death, it was revised and expanded by his son, John Lewis Roget (1828–1908), and later by John's son, the engineer Samuel Romilly Roget (1875–1953). Roget's private library was put up for auction in 1870 at Sotheby's and its catalogue has been analysed.

== Other interests ==
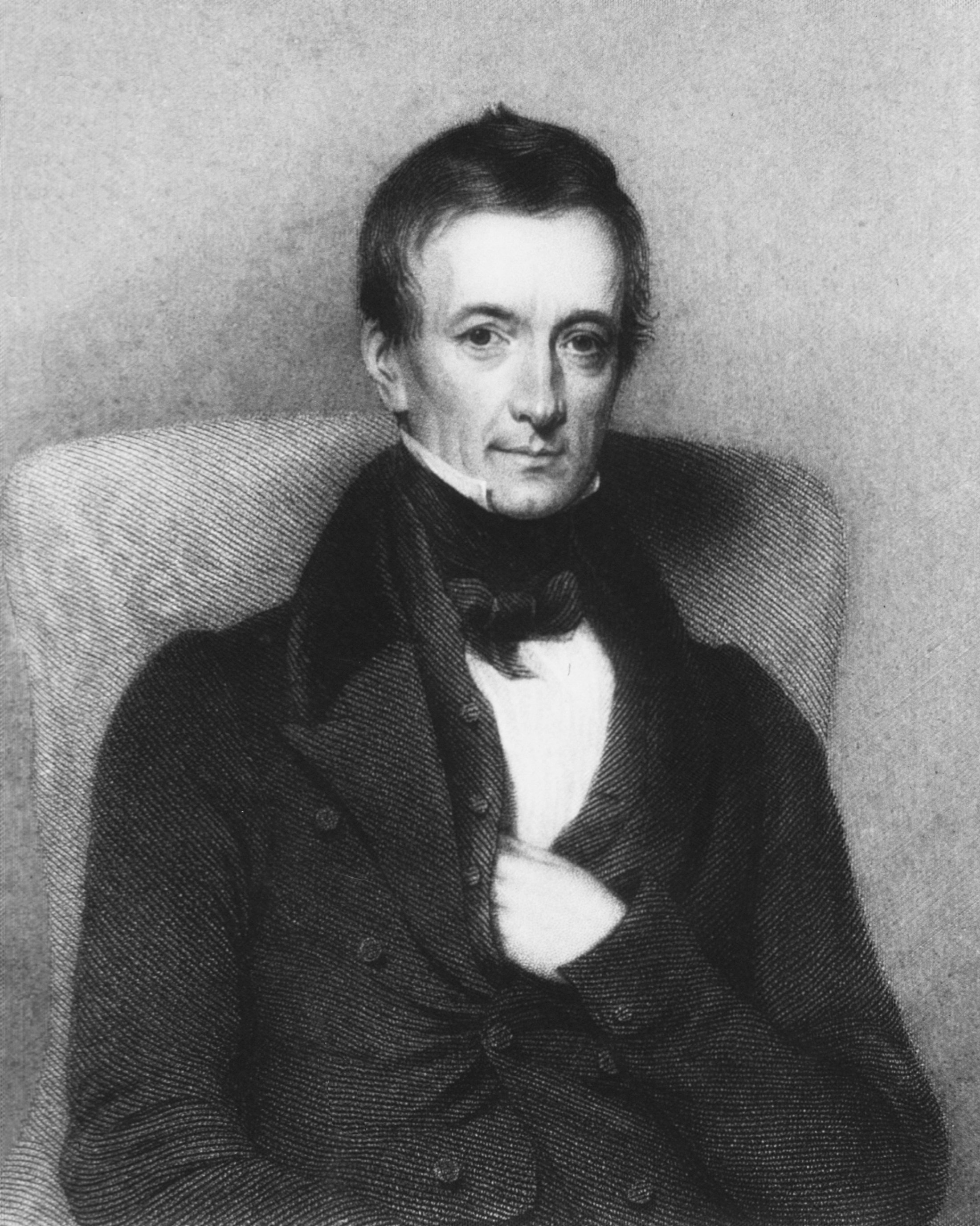
Official portrait by Thomas Pettigrew

Roget was elected to membership of the Manchester Literary and Philosophical Society on 25 January 1805 and as a Fellow of the Royal Society in 1815, in recognition of a paper on a slide rule with a loglog scale. He was a secretary of the Society from 1827 to 1848. On 9 December 1824, Roget presented a paper on a peculiar optical illusion to the Philosophical Transactions, which was published in 1825, as Explanation of an optical deception in the appearance of the spokes of a wheel when seen through vertical apertures. The paper was noted by Michael Faraday and by Joseph Plateau, who both mentioned it in their articles that presented new illusions with apparent motion. It has often been heralded as the basis for the persistence of vision theory, which has for a long time been falsely regarded as the principle causing the perception of motion in animation and film. In 1834, Roget claimed to have invented "the Phantasmascope or Phenakisticope" in the spring of 1831, almost two years before Plateau introduced that first stroboscopic animation device.

One of the promoters of the Medical and Chirurgical Society of London, of which he was the President in 1829, and which later became the Royal Society of Medicine, Roget was also a founder of the Society for the Diffusion of Useful Knowledge, writing a series of popular manuals for it. He wrote numerous papers on physiology and health, among them the fifth Bridgewater Treatise, Animal and Vegetable Physiology considered with reference to Natural Theology (1834), and articles for the Encyclopædia Britannica. He was hostile to phrenology, writing against it in a Britannica supplement in 1818 and devoting a two-volume work to it in 1838.

A chess player, in an article in the London and Edinburgh Philosophical Magazine Roget solved the general open knight's tour problem. He composed chess problems and designed an inexpensive pocket chessboard.

=== Selected publications ===
- Treatises on Electricity, Galvanism, Magnetism, and Electro-magnetism. London: Baldwin and Cradock. 1832. LCCN 08007072.
- Animal and Vegetable Physiology Considered with Reference to Natural Theology. Bridgewater Treatises. Vol. I–II. London: William Pickering. 2009 [1834]. ISBN 9781108000086. LCCN 06011266.
- Thesaurus of English Words and Phrases (Fourth ed.). London: Longman, Brown, Green, and Longmans. 1856.

== Personal life ==
In 1818 Roget was called to the home of Samuel Romilly following the death of his wife, Lady Romilly. Samuel Romilly, Roget's uncle and surrogate father, then committed suicide by cutting his throat, dying in Roget's presence.

=== Family ===
In 1824 Roget married Mary Taylor, the daughter of Jonathan Hobson. They had a son, John Lewis (1828–1908), and a daughter, Kate.

=== Later life ===
In later life Roget became deaf and was cared for by his daughter, Kate. He died aged 90 while on holiday in West Malvern, Worcestershire and was laid to rest in St. James Church cemetery, West Malvern. There is a memorial to him at his local parish church of St Mary on Paddington Green Church.

== In literature ==
Canadian writer Keath Fraser published a story, Roget's Thesaurus, in 1982, which is narrated in Roget's voice. He has Roget speak on his wife's death, from cancer.

Roget also appears in Shelagh Stephenson's An Experiment with an Air Pump, set in 1799, as the only historical character. The play is set in the fictional household of Joseph Fenwick, and Roget is one of Fenwick's assistants.

A picture-book biography of Roget entitled The Right Word: Roget and His Thesaurus was published by Eerdmans Books in 2014. It was named a Caldecott Honor book for excellence in illustration and won the Sibert Medal for excellence in children's nonfiction.

Martin Luther King, Jr. cites Roget’s Thesaurus in the context of racism:

”Even semantics have conspired to make that which is black seem ugly and degrading. In Roget’s Thesaurus there are some 120 synonyms for "blackness" and at least 60 of them are offensive—such words as "blot", "soot", "grime", "devil" and "foul". There are some 134 synonyms for "whiteness", and all are favorable, expressed in such words as "purity", "cleanliness", "chastity" and "innocence".

Academic offices
Preceded by	Fullerian Professor of Physiology; 1834–1837	Succeeded by Robert Edmond Grant
