= An Experiment with an Air Pump =

Play written by Shelagh Stephenson

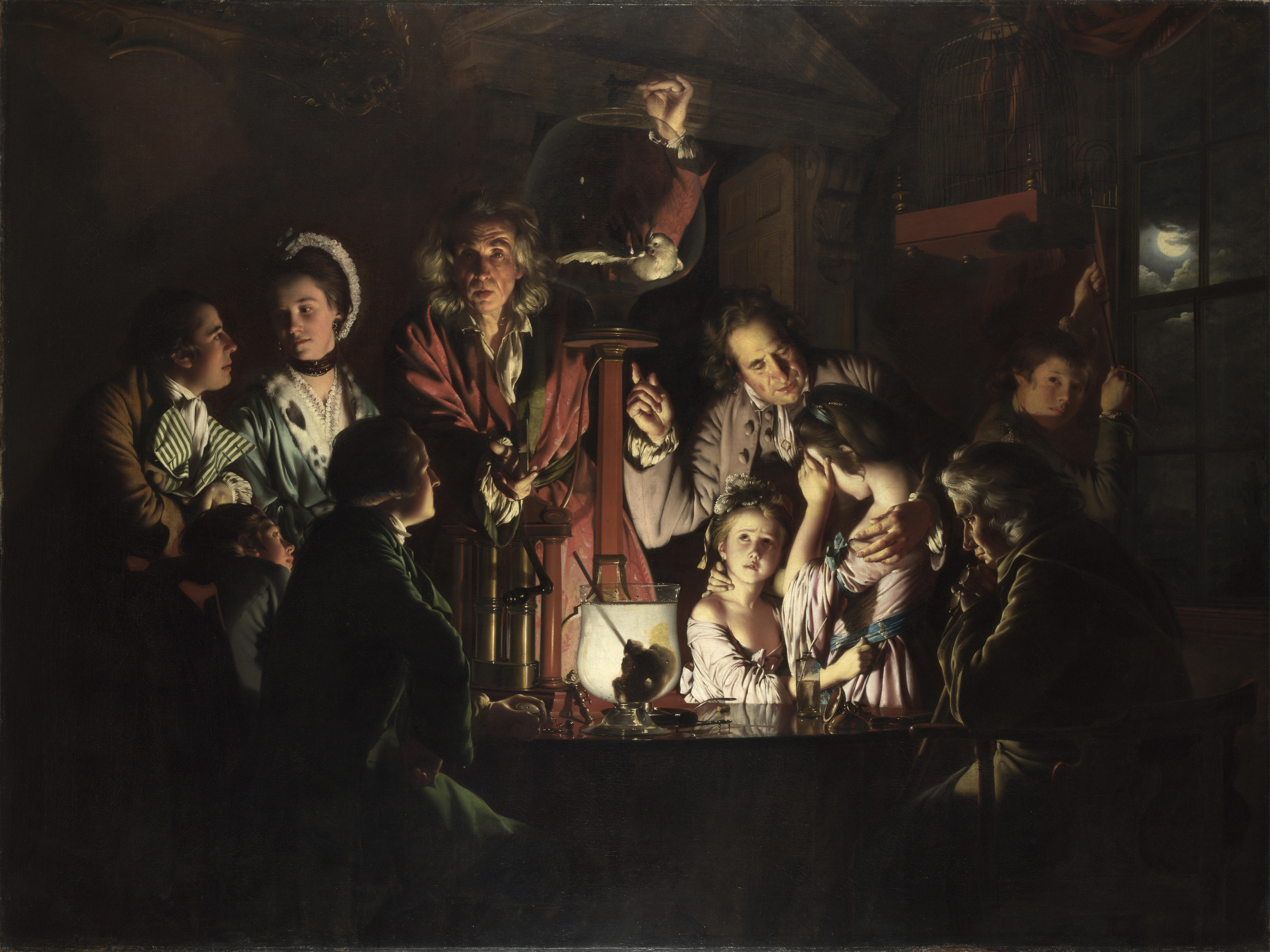
- An Experiment on a Bird in the Air Pump by Joseph Wright of Derby, 1768
- Written by: Shelagh Stephenson
- Characters: Joseph Fenwick; Susannah Fenwick; Harriet Fenwick; Maria Fenwick; Peter Mark Roget; Thomas Armstrong; Isobel Bridie; Ellen; Tom; Phil; Kate
- Original language: English
- Subject: Science and morality
- Genre: Drama
- Setting: A house in Newcastle-Upon-Tyne in 1799 and 1999

Premiere
- Date premiered: 12 February 1998
- Place premiered: Royal Exchange Theatre, Manchester
- www.methuen.co.uk

An Experiment with an Air Pump is a play by English playwright Shelagh Stephenson inspired by the painting An Experiment on a Bird in the Air Pump by Joseph Wright. It shared the Peggy Ramsay Award for 1997, was first performed at the Royal Exchange Theatre, Manchester in 1998, and has since been staged by a number of other companies worldwide. It was published in Plays One, a collection of Stephenson's plays published in 2002.

== Plot summary ==
The plot takes place in the same house in two different time periods divided by the gap of two hundred years (1799 and 1999). The play questions the basic principles of scientific (medical) research, such as the right of the scientist to cross ethical limits: the right to perform dissection on the recently deceased (1799) and use of embryos in stem-cell research (1999).

Both years are symbolic due to their stand at the turns of new centuries and have to face the challenges the new times are about to bring. There was also a development in medicine in the 19th and of genetics in the 21st centuries.

The play also implicitly deals with gender roles and questions the stereotypes of women scientists. While in 1799, it is the father (Fenwick) who is the enlightened soul and his male friends are also scientists (Armstrong, the physician, and Roget, the to-be-author of the thesaurus), his wife (Susannah) is a stereotypical wife of the time and their two daughters (Maria and Harriet) are expected to be such, too. The decision of one of them to become a scientist leads to disapproval. In 1999, the roles somehow change: Ellen, the wife, is the geneticist, and her husband, Tom, is a historian. Ellen's friend, Kate, is also a young genetic researcher. There are also two "uneducated" characters: Isobel, the 1799 maid, and Phil, the 1999 handyman.

An additional theme of this play involves the ethics of using human life, in any form, for the advancement of science. Though the topic is not specifically discussed in 1799, the characters in 1999 do talk about the issue, though no concrete conclusions are drawn.

Besides the general questions about a scientist's responsibilities and limits, the play is in part a detective story. In the modern times, a skeleton is found in the basement. The skipping between the two time periods highlights, then resolves, questions about the identity of the corpse and the means of their death.

After Armstrong seduces Isobel, he confesses to Roget that he feigned love for Isobel because then she would agree to have intercourse with him. If she is naked, then he can examine her twisted spine more thoroughly. Isobel overhears and is moved to kill herself by hanging. Armstrong finds her hanging and speeds up the process. The characters in 1799 ring in the new year with the death of Isobel, whereas, the characters in 1999 begin the new millennium leaving their old home, and the certainties it possessed for them, behind.

== Characters ==
=== Dr. Joseph Fenwick (1799) ===
Dr. Fenwick is a radical physician who believes that republicanism is the way forward. He has a fairly cynical view of the world and is a scientist because he "want[s] to change the world".

=== Susannah Fenwick (1799) ===
Susannah is the wife of Joseph Fenwick. She is, in some respects, the 1799 equivalent of Tom, with a passion for reading, poetry and art. Susannah overcomes issues with her husband about love and respect throughout the play, though it is clear she drinks heavily and relies upon childish behaviour to gain the attention she so desperately requires.

=== Harriet Fenwick (1799) ===
Harriet is the daughter of Joseph and Susannah Fenwick and the sister of Maria. She admires her Father but loses her temper easily.

=== Maria Fenwick (1799) ===
Maria is also the daughter of Joseph and Susannah Fenwick and is the sister of Harriet. She always wants to be the centre of attention and is in constant competition with Harriet to see who can be the better daughter. She is engaged to a character who is never seen on stage called Edward.

=== Peter Mark Roget (1799) ===
Roget is the only character in the play based on a real person- the creator of Roget's Thesaurus. In the play, he is a character in whom an inward moral battle rages about the ethics of science, though he maintains that he is a scientist because he wants to "understand the society".

=== Thomas Armstrong (1799) ===
Armstrong is a cold, ruthless physician who is particularly interested with the structure of the human body. He is staying with the Fenwicks after Dr. Farleigh (a character never seen on stage) persuades Dr. Fenwick to "take him on for three months".

=== Isobel Bridie (1799) ===
Isobel is the maid of the Fenwick household. She is originally from lowland Scotland and has a hunchback. Although timid, Isobel has a passion for words and it is evident that she is an intelligent, though self-conscious person.

=== Ellen (1999) ===
Ellen is a geneticist who is being persuaded to take a job that is being offered to her from Kate's company.

=== Tom (1999) ===
Tom is Ellen's husband and is an English lecturer but he has been made redundant. Therefore, he is depressed and has concerns about Ellen's job.

=== Phil (1999) ===
Phil is a geordie building surveyor who is surveying Ellen and Tom's house which they are planning to sell. He offers human compassion and comic relief in the play.

=== Kate (1999) ===
Kate is Ellen's friend/fellow geneticist who offers her a job at her company. She is in direct conflict with Tom for most of the play as they both have opposing views on the conduct and morality of scientific exploration.

== Performances ==
- Royal Exchange Theatre, Manchester, UK (1998)
- Hampstead Theatre, London, UK (1998)
- Manhattan Theatre Club, New York, NY, US (1999)
- Dallas Theater Center Dallas, TX, US (2000)
- Shipping Dock Theatre, Rochester, NY, US (2002)
- Middlebury College, Middlebury, VT, US (2005)
- John Lewis Partnership Dramatic Society, Royal Court Theatre, London (2005)
- Langston Hughes Theater, Seattle, WA, US (2006)
- University of South Dakota, Vermillion, SD, US (2006)
- University of Adelaide, Australia (2007)
- Amarillo College, US (2007)
- Alnwick Playhouse, Northumberland, UK (2007)
- Maddermarket Theatre, Norwich (2007)
- Phillip Lynch Theatre, Lewis University, Romeoville, IL, US (2008)
- Sinclair Community College, Dayton, OH (2008)
- University of Nebraska–Lincoln, Lincoln (2008)
- Lansing Community College (2009)
- The Little Theatre, Hertford, UK (May 2009)
- Hampstead Theatre, London, UK (October 2009)
- University of San Diego, San Diego, CA (November 2009)
- University of New Orleans, New Orleans, LA (November 2010)
- English Theatre Berlin, (February 2011)
- University of Waterloo, Waterloo, ON (March 2011)
- Giant Olive Theatre Company, London, UK (2011)

Western Washington University, Bellingham, WA (2012)

- Wesley Institute Sydney, Drummoyne, NSW Australia (2014)
- George Mason University, Fairfax, VA (2015)
- Theatre Arts Guild at Georgia Perimeter College, Clarkston, GA (2015)
- Corcoran's Sacre Coeur, Paris, FR (2016)

- Baylor University, Waco, TX (2016)
- No Drama Theatre, Smock Alley Theatre, Dublin, Ireland (2017)
- Christopher Newport University, Newport News, VA (2019)
- Alnwick Playhouse, Northumberland, UK (2021)
