= Five Kinds of Silence =

Five Kinds of Silence is an in-yer-face theatre play by the playwright Shelagh Stephenson, first published in 1997. It tells the story of a family living under the power of the vicious Billy, who physically, emotionally, and sexually abuses his wife, Mary, and children; Susan and Janet. The stage play is adapted from the radio production of the same name.

The stage version of the play was first performed at the Lyric Hammersmith, London, on 31 May 2000, starring LizzyMcInnery, Gina McKee, Tim Pigott-Smith, Linda Bassett, Dione Inman and Gary Whitaker. The play won the 1996 UK Writers Guild's Best Original Play award and the 1997 Sony Award for Best Original Drama.

== Plot ==
Major themes in the play are control and how the family is bonded by abuse. Throughout the play we learn from the three women that Billy had created a strange, warped world for them to be confined in from inside his damaged mind. The story of abuse that Billy's family endured unfolds from interviews with police officials and psychologists with Mary, Susan and Janet. Billy himself was abused when he was a child; Mary was abused by her father after the death of her mother. After so many years the two daughters shoot their father during an epileptic seizure.

The play is coordinated to bring out Billy's passively sinister presence, and although he is not physically there, he is present in their memories. His abuse to these women has been so horrific that they shoot him twice to make sure he is dead.

The play also explores ideas of abuse being continued from childhood, how abused children may in the future abuse their own children and isolation from the outside world. This theory relates to John Bowlby's Continuity hypothesis. How the relationship an infant has with its parent or parents shapes future ideas about relationships and future behaviour towards relationships.

== Productions ==
- 2013, Lace Market Theatre, Nottingham, United Kingdom (29 May – 1 June)
  - Fraser Wanless (Billy)
  - Emma Nash (Mary)
  - Lisamarie Court (Janet)
  - Tilda Stickley (Susan)
  - Lyndon Sheppard (Detective)
  - Bex Mason (Lawyer)
- 2019, Derby Theatre Studio, Derby, United Kingdom (10 May – 11 May) University of Derby student production
  - George Binns (Billy)
  - Charlie Ayers (Mary)
  - Ellie Williams (Janet)
  - Hannah Arnott (Susan)
  - Rhiannon Fitzpatrick (Detective)
  - Lauren Asman (Lawyer)
  - Kira Barnett (Psychiatrist)
- 2018, UEA Theatre, Norwich, United Kingdom, UEA Student Production
  - Matt King (Billy)
