= Roget's Thesaurus =

Synonym dictionary (1805) by Peter Mark Roget

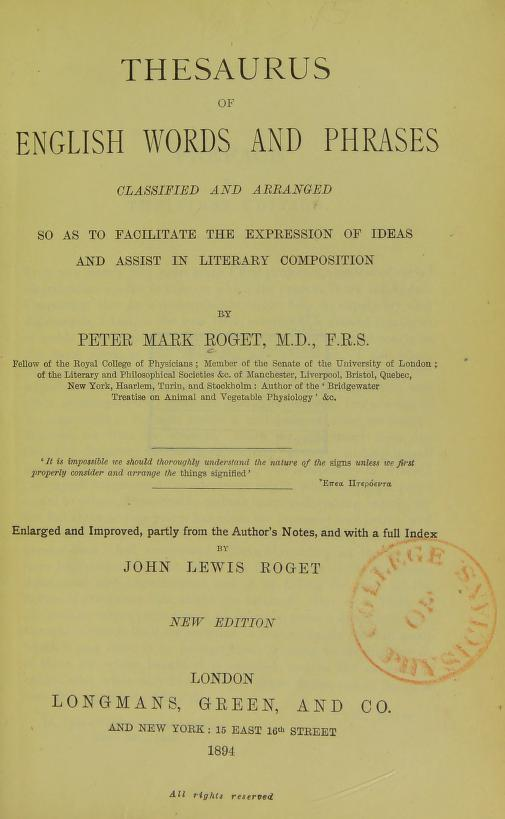
- Title page of the 1894 edition
- Author: Peter Mark Roget
- Language: English
- Genre: Linguistics
- ISBN: 978-0140515039

Roget's Thesaurus is a widely used English-language thesaurus, created from 1805 by Peter Mark Roget (1779–1869), a British physician, natural theologian and lexicographer. It began as a compilation for personal use, but was published in 1852.

== History ==
It was released to the public on 29 April 1852. Dr Peter Mark Roget former secretary of the Royal Society was inspired by the Utilitarian teachings of Jeremy Bentham and wished to help "those who are painfully groping their way and struggling with the difficulties of composition ... this work processes to hold out a helping hand". The Karpeles Library Museum houses the original manuscript in its collection.

Roget's schema of classes and their subdivisions is based on the philosophical work of Leibniz, itself following a long tradition of epistemological work starting with Aristotle. Some of Aristotle's Categories are included in Roget's first class, "abstract relations".

== Content ==
Roget described his thesaurus in the foreword to the first edition:

It is now nearly fifty years since I first projected a system of verbal classification similar to that on which the present work is founded. Conceiving that such a compilation might help to supply my own deficiencies, I had, in the year 1805, completed a classed catalogue of words on a small scale, but on the same principle, and nearly in the same form, as the Thesaurus now published.

Roget's Thesaurus is composed of six primary classes. Each class is composed of multiple divisions and then sections. This may be conceptualized as a tree containing over a thousand branches for individual "meaning clusters" or semantically linked words. Although these words are not strictly synonyms, they can be viewed as colours or connotations of a meaning or as a spectrum of a concept. One of the most general words is chosen to typify the spectrum as its headword, which labels the whole group.

== Editions ==
The original edition had 15,000 words and each successive edition has been larger, with the most recent edition (the eighth) containing 443,000 words. The book is updated regularly and each edition is heralded as a gauge to contemporary terms; but each edition keeps true to the original classifications established by Roget. The name "Roget" is trademarked in parts of the world, such as the United Kingdom. By itself, it is not protected in the United States, where use of the name "Roget" in the title of a thesaurus does not necessarily indicate any relationship to Roget directly; it has come to be seen as a generic thesaurus name.

In 1952 the copyright belonging after Roget's death in 1869 to his son "John Lewis" Roget a lawyer then his grandson "Samuel Romilly" Roget a engineer passed to the original publishers, now known as Longman. The first Penguin edition appeared in 1953 and the second designed par Robert A. Dutch in 1966. Susan M. Lloyd née Emmerson, former teacher in Birmingham and in Uganda, Master Philosophy degree at the University of East Anglia, edited the first revision for twenty years of Roget's Thesaurus, published by Longman in 1982. Betty Kirkpatrick resumes the revision of the Thesaurus in 1987.

== See also ==
- Moby Thesaurus

== Bibliography ==
- Baumgartner, Jason L.; Waugh, Timothy A. (2002), Erbacher, Robert F.; Chen, Philip C.; Groehn, Matti; Roberts, Jonathan C.; Wittenbrink, Craig M. (eds.), "Roget2000: A 2D Hyperbolic Tree Visualization of Roget's Thesaurus", Visualization and Data Analysis 2002, 4665, Bloomington, IN: School of Library and Information Science, Indiana University: 339, Bibcode:2002SPIE.4665..339B, doi:10.1117/12.458803, S2CID 893530
- Emblen, D.L. (1969), "The Library of Peter Mark Roget", The Book Collector, 18 (4 (winter)): 449–469
- Hüllen, Werner (2004), A History of Roget's Thesaurus: origins, development, and design, Oxford [England]: Oxford University Press, doi:10.1093/acprof:oso/9780199254729.001.0001, ISBN 1-4237-8876-1
- Hüllen, Werner (2009), Networks and knowledge in Roget's Thesaurus, Oxford: Oxford University Press, doi:10.1093/acprof:oso/9780199553235.001.0001, ISBN 978-0-19-955323-5
- Kendall, Joshua C. (2008), The Man Who Made Lists: love, death, madness, and the creation of Roget's Thesaurus, New York: G. P. Putnam’s Sons, ISBN 978-0-399-15462-1, OCLC 156902279
- Roget, Peter Mark (1982), Lloyd, Sue (ed.), Roget's Thesaurus of English Words and Phrases, Harlow, Essex: Longman, ISBN 0-582-55635-X, OCLC 8546324
- Roget, Peter Mark (1962) [1852], Dutch, Robert A. (ed.), The Original Roget's Thesaurus of English Words and Phrases (Americanized ed.), New York: Longmans, Green & Co./Dell Publishing Co., Inc.
