= Two Girls Dressing a Kitten by Candlelight =

Painting by Joseph Wright of Derby

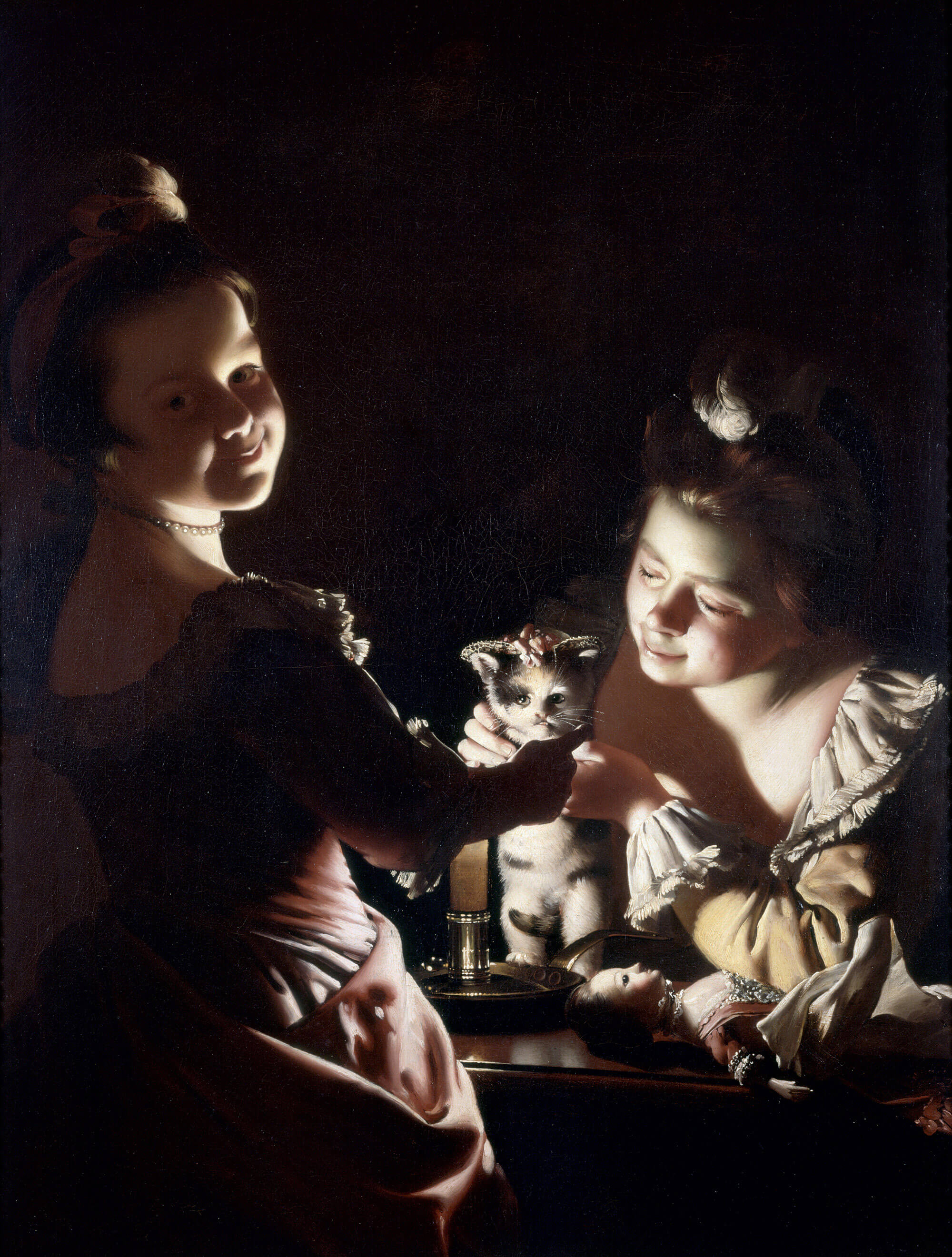
- Artist: Joseph Wright of Derby
- Year: c. 1768–1770
- Medium: Oil on canvas
- Dimensions: 89 cm × 68 cm (35 in × 27 in)
- Location: Kenwood House; London

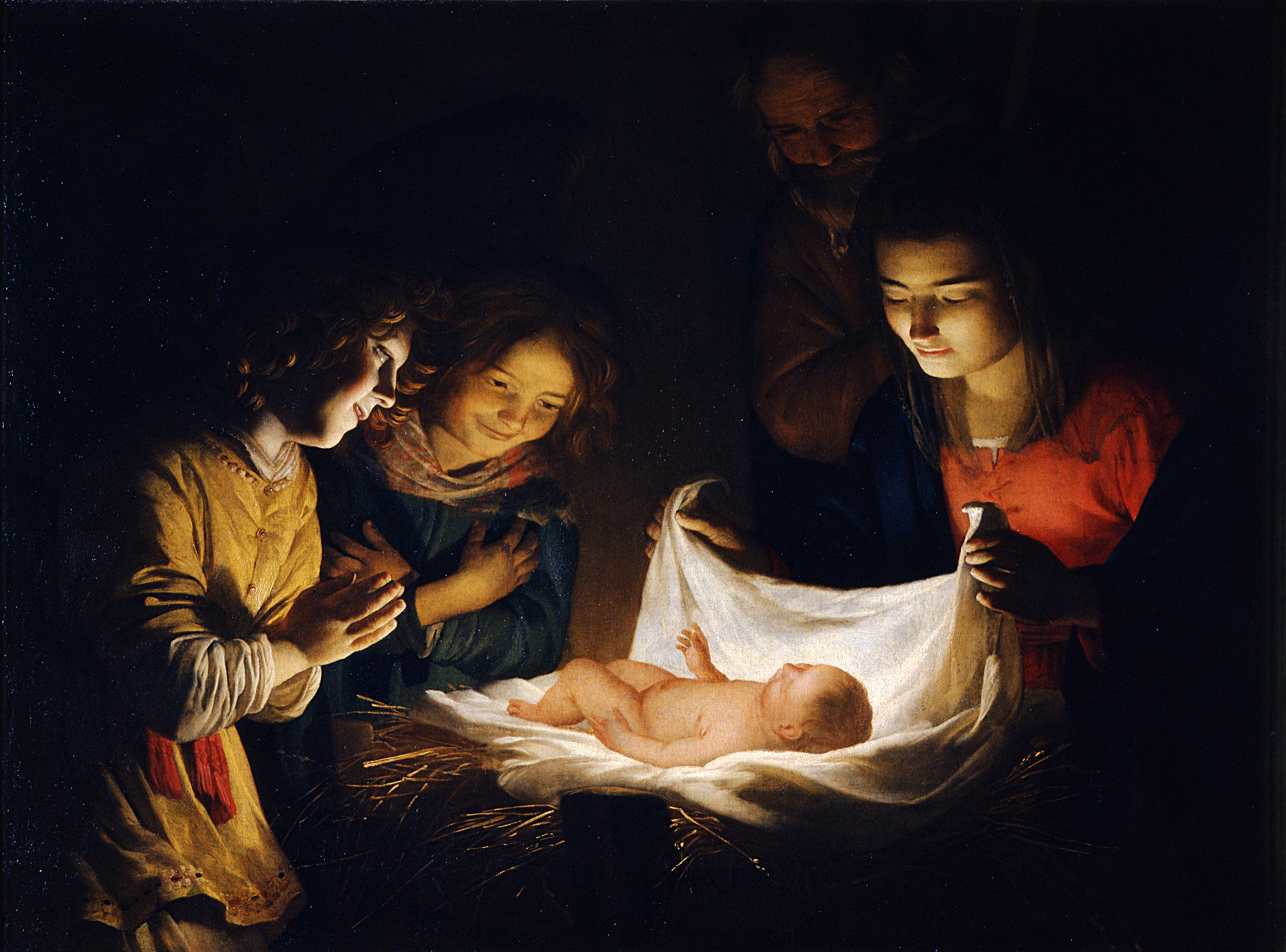
Gerard van Honthorst, Adoration of the Child, 1620. Uffizi gallery, Florence.

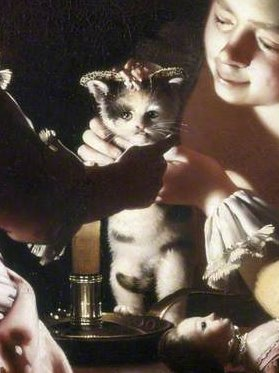
Two Girls Dressing a Kitten by Candlelight (detail)

Two Girls Dressing a Kitten by Candlelight (also known as Two Girls Decorating a Cat and Dressing the Kitten) (c. 1768–1770) is a "fancy painting" by Joseph Wright of Derby (1734–1797). The painting is displayed at the Kenwood House Public Museum, located in the London Hampstead area.

It is believed that the painting was created by Joseph Wright as a pair for the painting “Two Boys with a Bladder,” which became widely known for the acquisition of this painting (which was practically unknown to specialists) by the American J. Paul Getty Museum and the temporary refusal of British government to grant a license to export it outside UK.

The picture is one of a number of candlelit studies made by Wright that demonstrate his skill in the use of chiaroscuro in which he specialised. Apparently an innocent scene of little girls dressing a kitten, the picture has been thought by art historians to have a number of deeper meanings.

== Genre and composition ==
Two Girls Dressing a Kitten by Candlelight would have been described in the late eighteenth century as a "fancy picture", a type of picture between portraiture and works with a historical or literary theme. It depicts two upper-class girls, probably sisters, who have put aside their doll in order to dress up their kitten instead.

The most notable feature of the painting is Wright's skillful use of chiaroscuro, the contrast of light and dark, a technique in which he specialised, here seen in the play of the candlelight on the figures of the girls. The English portrait painter James Northcote, who was a contemporary of Wright, called him "the most famous painter now living for candle-lights" and Wright's use of contrasts in this picture has been compared to the Utrecht Caravaggism of the religious paintings of Gerard van Honthorst, inspired also by French painter Georges de La Tour, which was the master in describing the candlelight on figures. Wright was also known for his close attention to detail which here may be seen in the careful depiction of the girls dresses, their doll, the necklace, and the bonnet on the kitten.

== Interpretation ==
A longer look at the picture indicates that it may not be so innocent as it seems. In contrast to the little girls in Wright's An Experiment on a Bird in the Air Pump (1768, thought to be the earlier work), who shrink from the suffering of the bird, the girls in this painting seem to be enjoying themselves. The theme of cruelty is the same however. The girl on the left is placed forward, almost outside the scene, her index finger pointing to her sister, inviting the spectator to observe the proceedings. Her maniacal expression and the shadowy uplighting add a sinister dimension, suggesting that something unnatural is going on. If the scene was entirely innocent it would surely be taking place in daylight and the positioning of the spectator at about the eye level of the children enhances the feeling that the viewer is entering the secret world of the child with its attendant moral ambiguity.

The sexual undertone in the picture is suggested by the kitten, gripped firmly by the neck and who we may infer is male, which stares out of the picture as though protesting the forced transvestism but at the same time suggesting with his tail an element of arousal, while the girls' doll lies on her back with her skirts around her waist. The candle adds drama by producing areas of light and dark, and refers to the transience of childhood. When the picture was painted the age of consent in England was just 12 and the girls, approaching womanhood, are more finely dressed than they need be, with fancy collars, cuffs and jewellery more appropriate to adults. The message is that today they dress up and cruelly toy with a helpless kitten, soon they will toy with the affections of real men. Wright did not marry until he was 38 and it has been speculated that the picture in some way reflects his frustrations with the opposite sex. There may also be an element of interest in the developing sexuality of the adolescent girls. Cats were often used in eighteenth-century painting as devices to indicate female sexuality.

The depiction of the girls in the painting has been contrasted with Wright's treatment of boys in his art. While the girls either shrink in horror from the cruelty in An Experiment on a Bird in the Air Pump, or turn cruelty into a game of fun in Dressing the Kitten in order to make it more acceptable to the viewer, the boys in Two Boys Blowing a Bladder by Candle-light are engaged in enlightenment scientific research, and the Two Boys Fighting over a Bladder are in the tradition of using children as allegories for adult ambition.

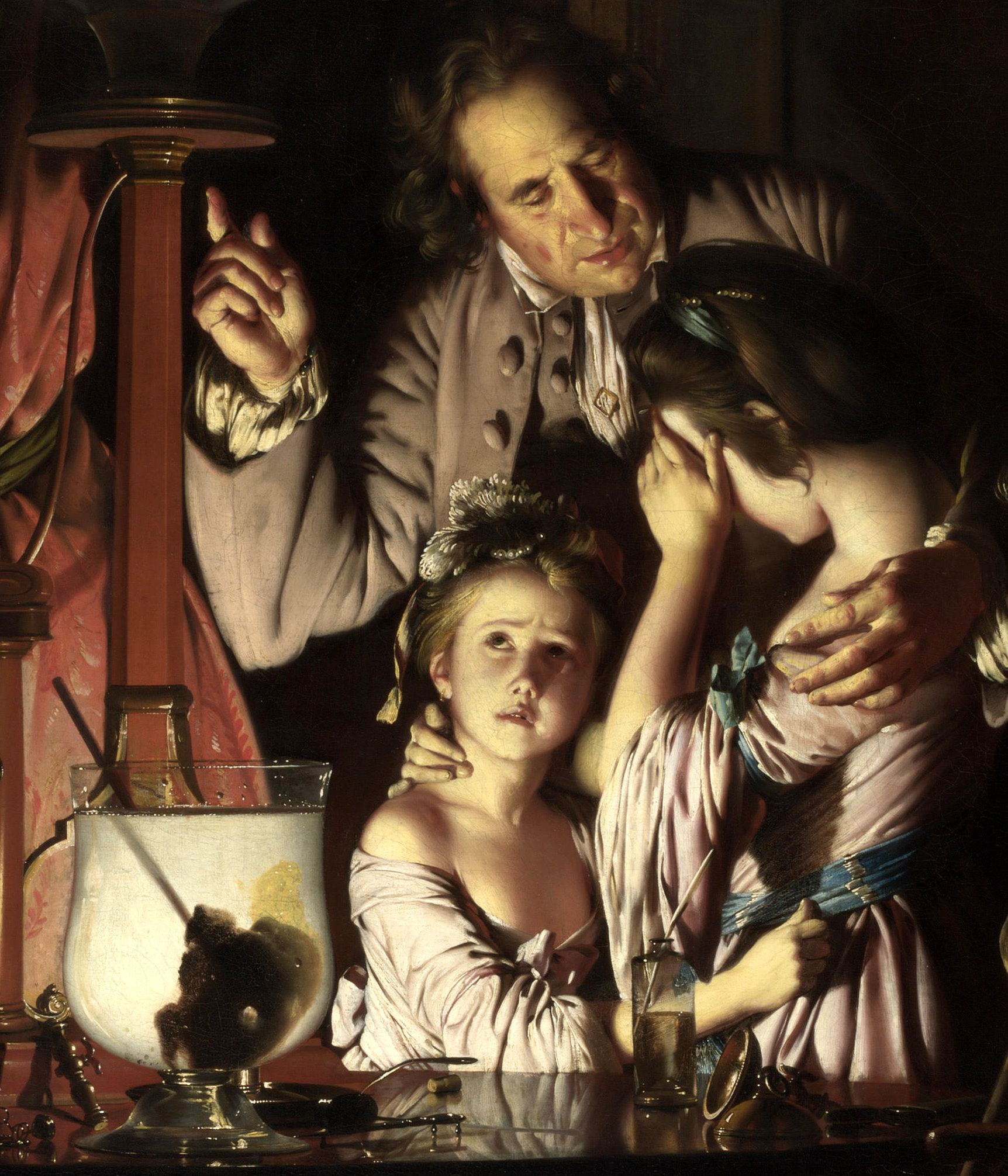
An Experiment on a Bird in the Air Pump, Joseph Wright of Derby, 1768. (detail)

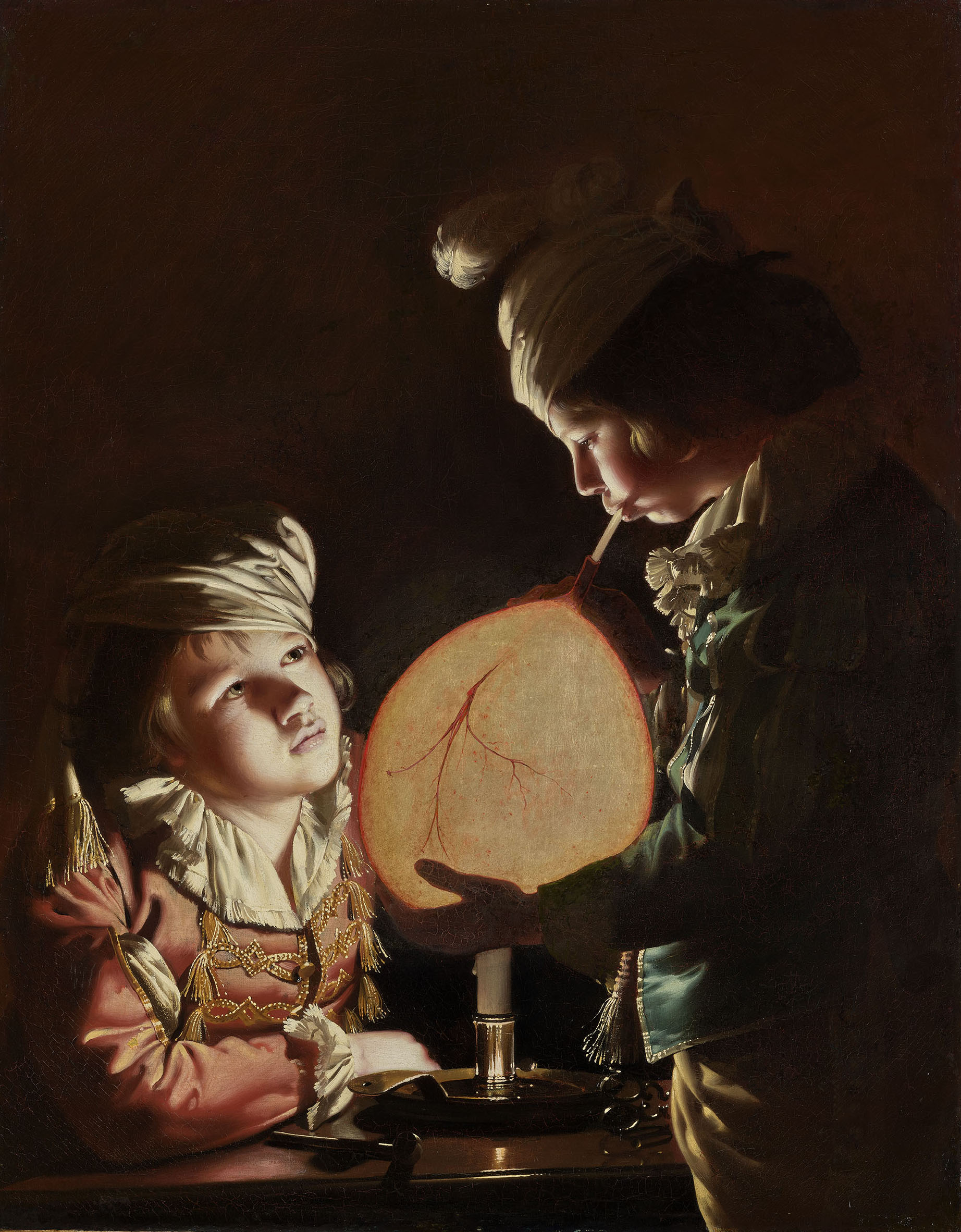
Two Boys Blowing a Bladder by Candle-light, by Joseph Wright of Derby 1769-70.

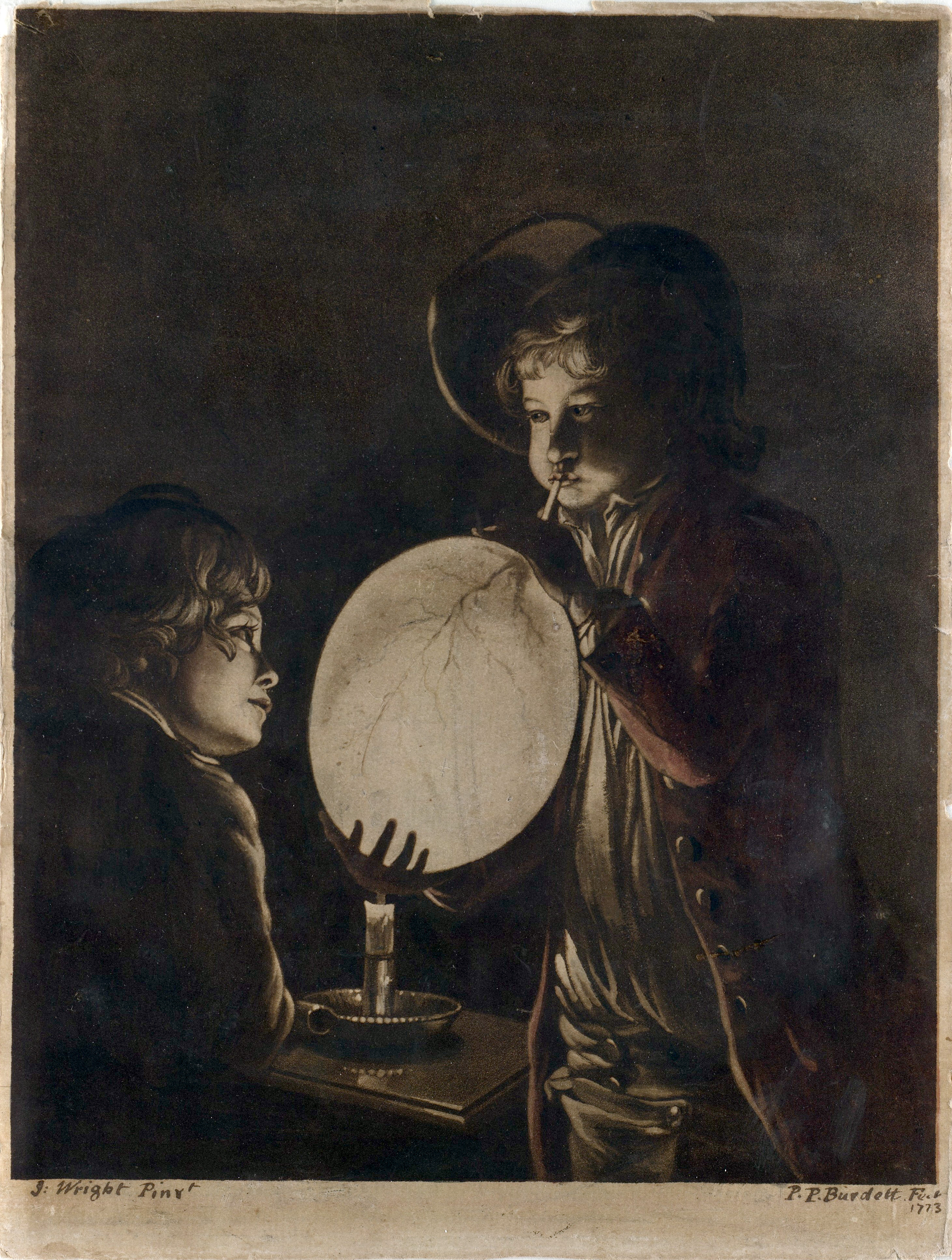
Peter Perez Burdett, Two Boys Blowing a Bladder by Candle-light, 1773 Aquatint after the original by Joseph Wright of Derby. Metropolitan Museum of Art, New York.

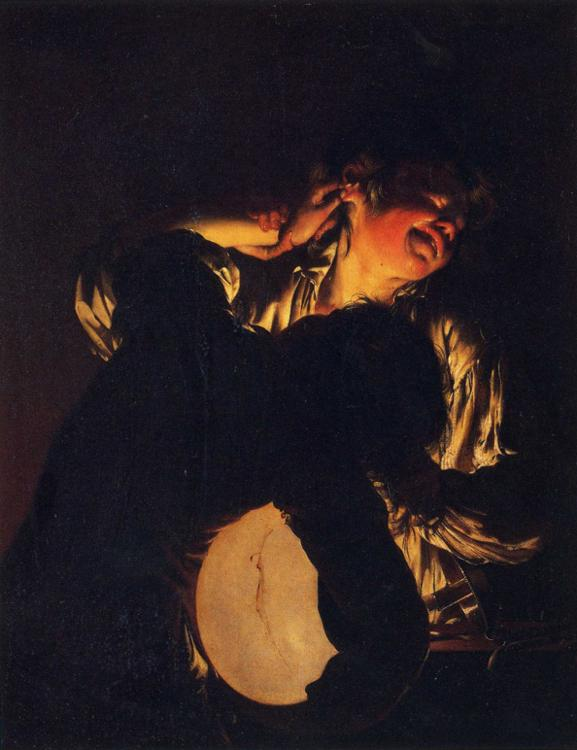
Two Boys Fighting over a Bladder, Joseph Wright of Derby, c.1767–8. Private collection.

Art historians have also placed the painting in the tradition of allegories of the cruelty of children as seen in the work of William Hogarth in plate I of The Four Stages of Cruelty (1751). The last in the series of the four stages, entitled "The Rewards of Cruelty", was a source for A Philosopher Lecturing on the Orrery (1766) and An Experiment on a Bird in the Air Pump (1768) and it is possible therefore that Wright owned all four of the engravings in the series. As a collector of prints, Wright may also have been aware of the work of earlier artists that explored similar themes, particularly Netherlandish painters such as Annibale Carracci, Judith Leyster and Jan van Bijlert, where there was a proverb "Whoever plays with a little cat will be scratched".

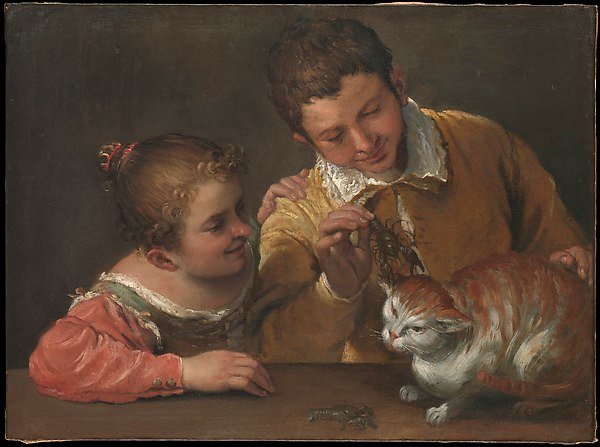
Annibale Carracci, Two Children Teasing a Cat, c. 1590. Metropolitan Museum of Art, New York

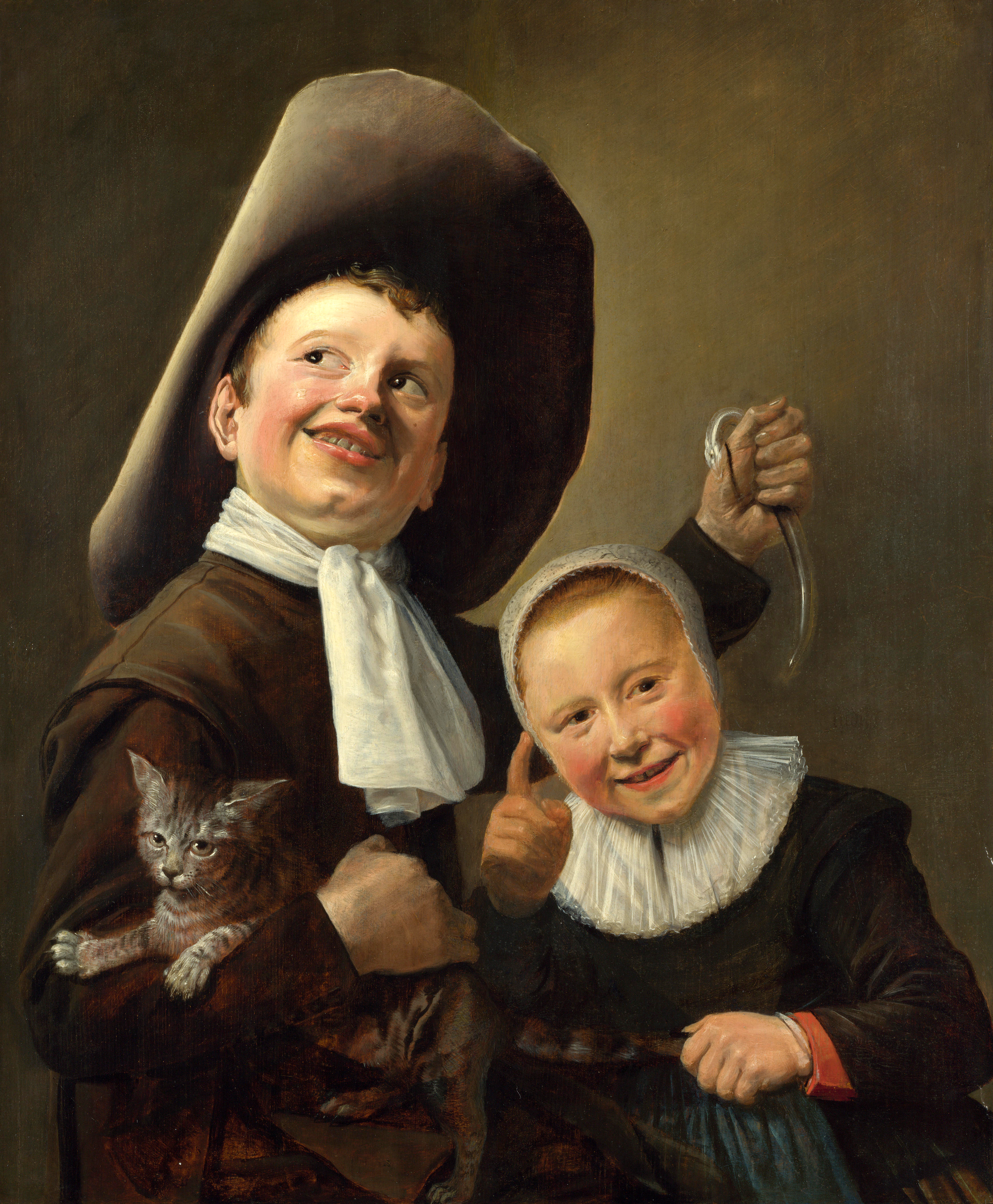
Judith Leyster, A Boy and a Girl with a Cat and an Eel, c. 1635. National Gallery, London

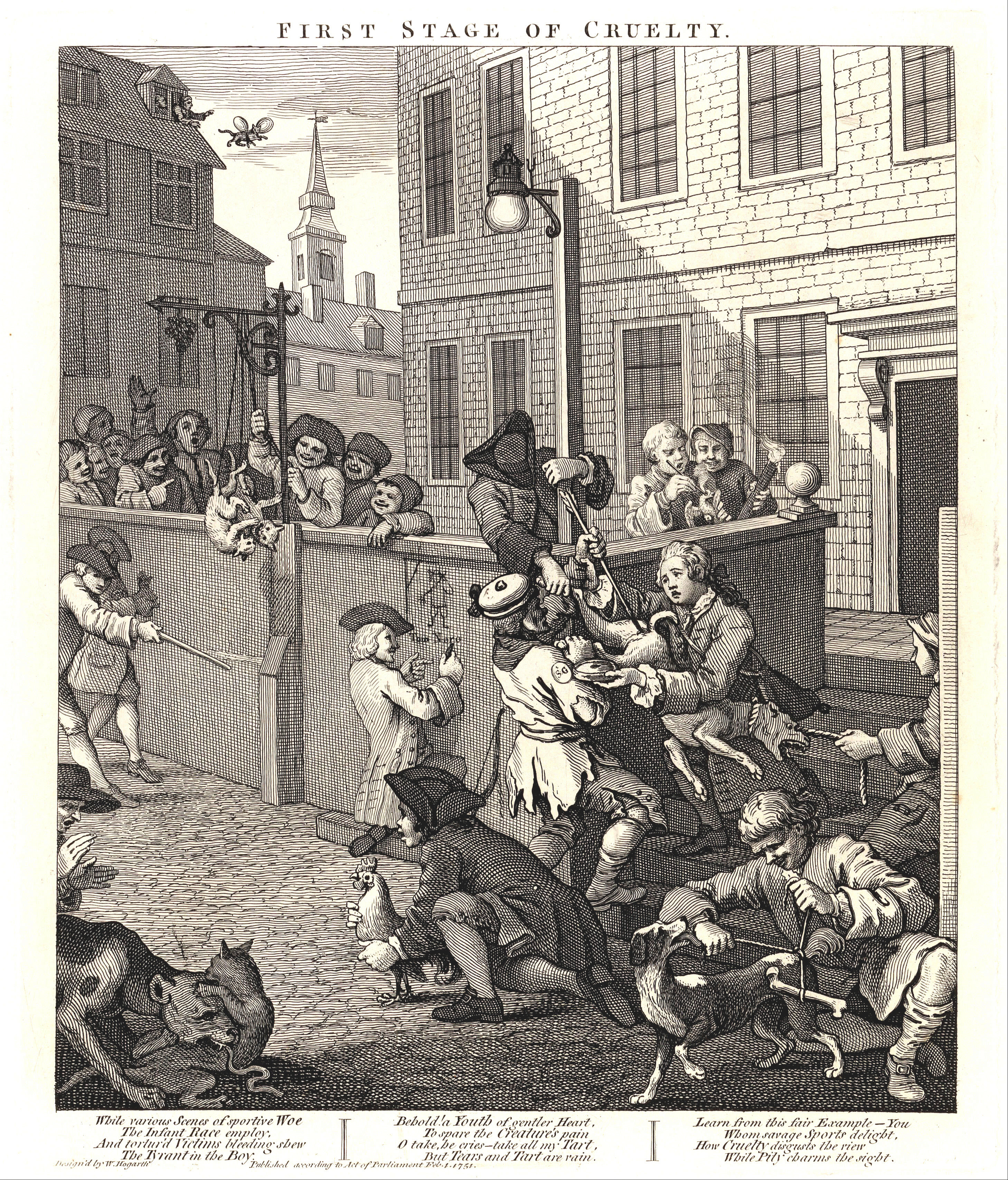
William Hogarth, "First Stage of Cruelty" (Plate I), The Four Stages of Cruelty, 1751

== Provenance ==
The exact date of completion of the painting is not known but Wright showed two "candle-light" paintings at the Society of Artists in 1767, and again in 1768. Dressing the Kitten may have been one of them. The painting was purchased at Christie's in 1772 by Henry Temple, second Viscount Palmerston (1739–1802), father of British Prime Minister Lord Palmerston.

The painting is now owned by English Heritage and located at Kenwood House, near Hampstead, London, where it has become the most popular picture on display. It was acquired by English Heritage in 1996 with financial help from the National Heritage Memorial Fund, National Art Collections Fund, London Historic House Museums Trust and the Friends of Kenwood from the executors of Mrs C.M. Riley in lieu of tax. It had been on loan to Kenwood House since 1972.

== Chiaroscuro in paintings by Joseph Wright ==
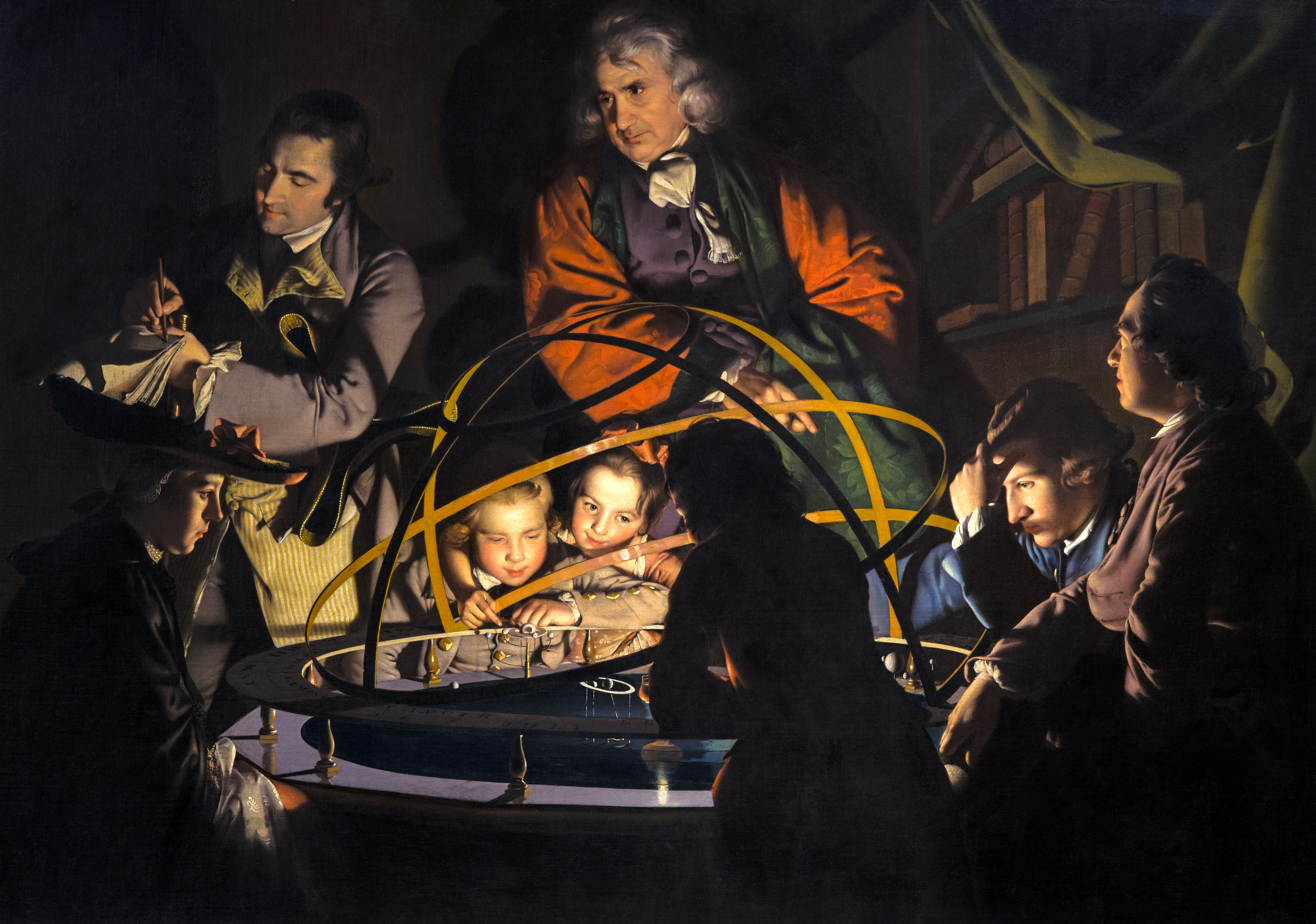
A Philosopher Lecturing on the Orrery, c. 1766, Derby Museum and Art Gallery, Derby

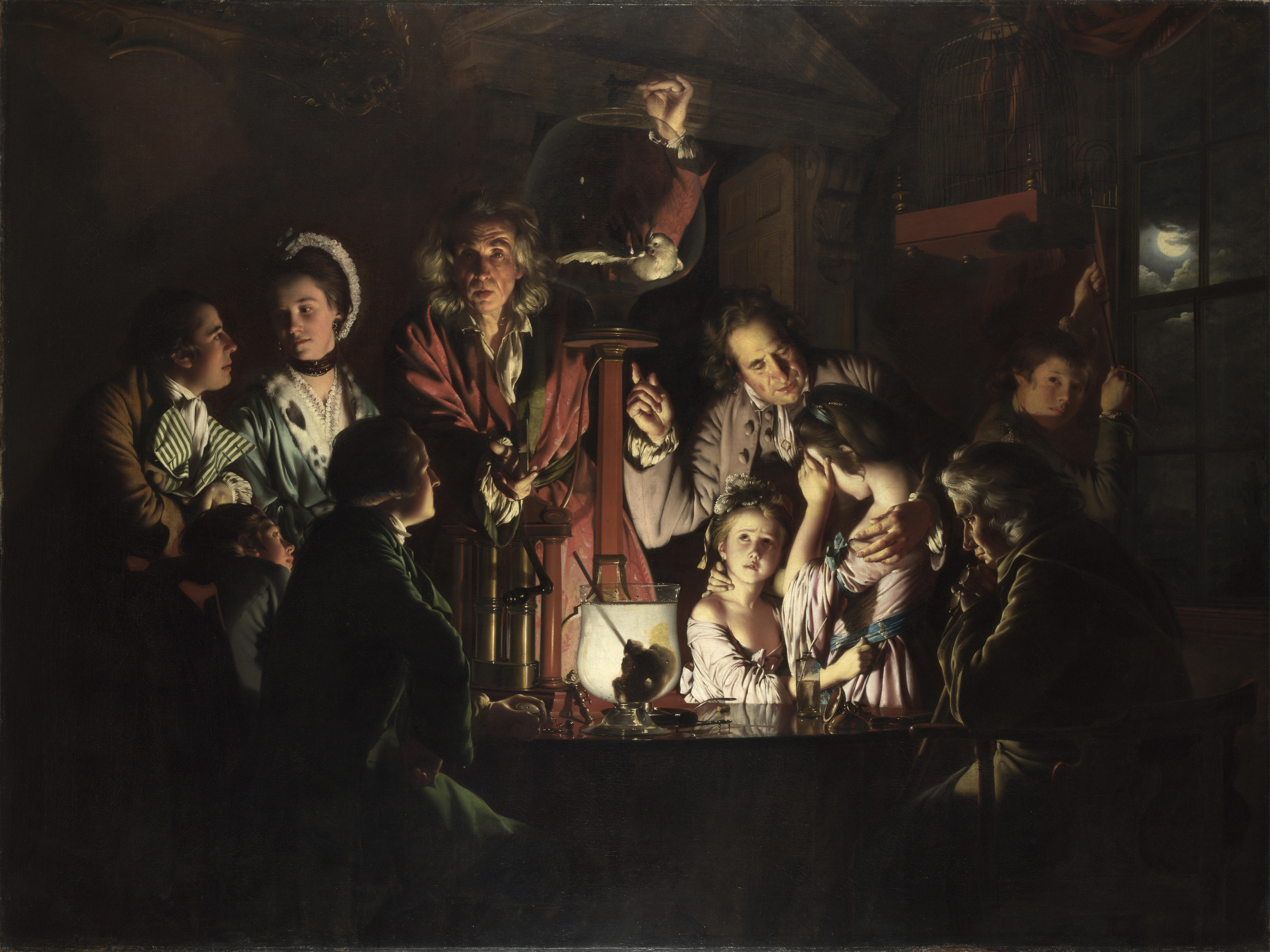
An Experiment on a Bird in the Air Pump, 1768, National Gallery, London

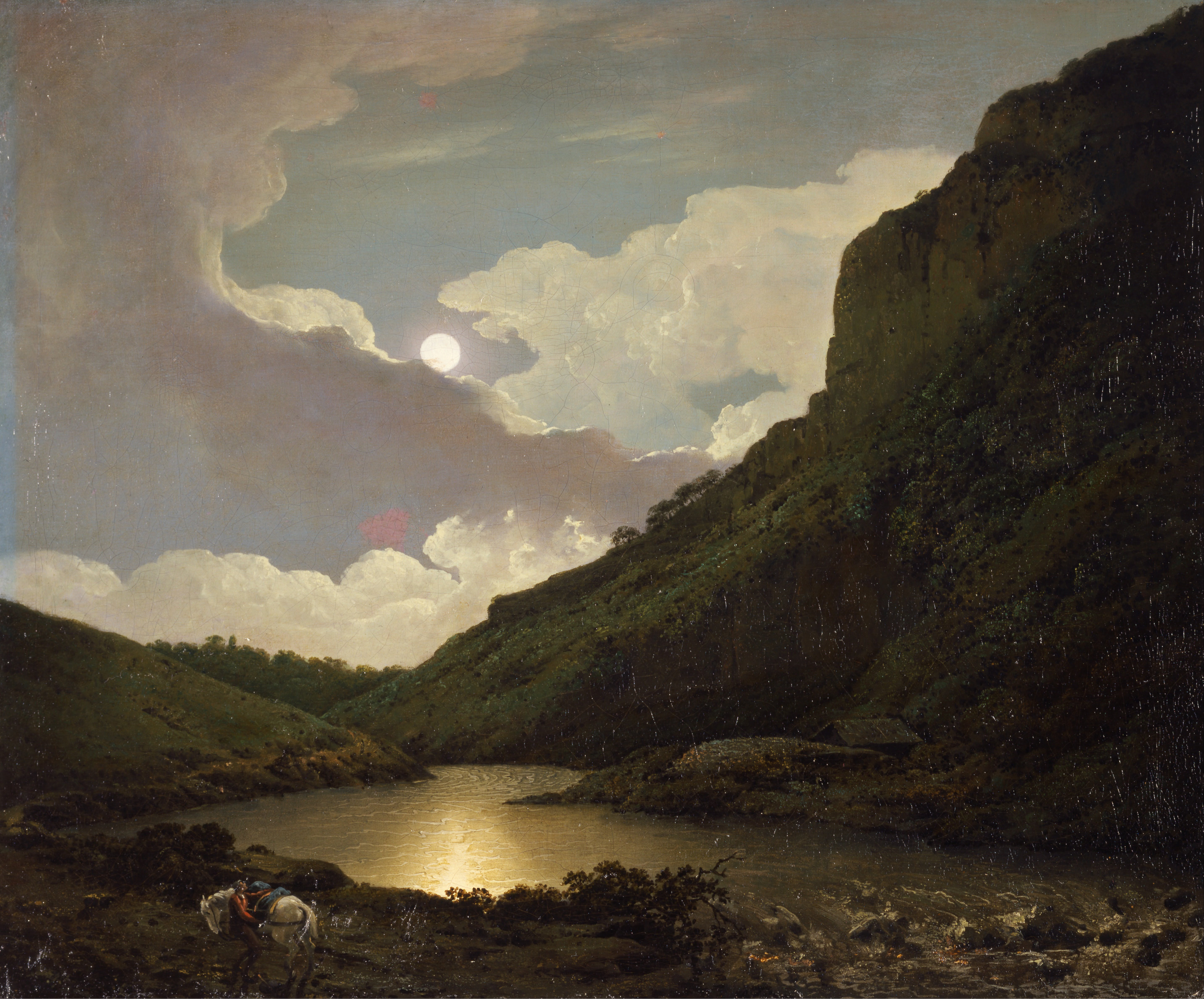
Matlock Tor by Moonlight, 1777–1780, Yale Center for British Art, New Haven
