= Before You Go (film) =

- Film poster
- Directed by: Lewis Gilbert
- Written by: Shelagh Stephenson
- Produced by: Eoin O'Callaghan
- Starring: Julie Walters; John Hannah; Joanne Whalley; Victoria Hamilton; Tom Wilkinson; Patricia Hodge
- Cinematography: Nic Morris
- Edited by: John Wilson
- Music by: Debbie Wiseman
- Distributed by: Entertainment Film Distributors (UK)
- Release date: 2002
- Running time: 94 minutes
- Country: United Kingdom
- Language: English
- Box office: $87,445

Before You Go is a 2002 comedy film directed by Lewis Gilbert (his final directorial effort). The imperfect lives of three sisters are revealed at their unloved mother's funeral.

== Plot ==
Three sisters, Teresa, Mary and Catherine grew up on The Isle of Man, where their mother Violet has died. Teresa and her husband Frank live there, and they have been looking after her. They summon the other two sisters to return for the funeral.

Teresa and Frank have a local vitamin and supplements business. He is her second husband, and is similar to their uncommunicative father. She constantly reminds her sisters that she and Frank have regularly helped their mother without their aid.

Mary, a doctor, has been having a long-term affair with fellow physician Mike, who is married with children. Catherine hasn’t fared much better, presently dating a Spaniard, Javier.

Mary has been placed by Teresa in their deceased mum’s bedroom. She regularly has visions and flashbacks of her while they are organising and preparing the funeral. Mary is searching for a box in the house that has a few of her things, but Teresa insists that she hasn’t seen it.

Catherine is shown to be flighty and her sisters don’t take her seriously. She lives beyond her means—even though she’s in debt, she constantly buys on credit. She also is always looking for a fix. Catherine periodically pretends to faint etc to get attention. And finally, they never remember her ‘boyfriend’ or ‘fiancé’s’ name because she is constantly changing partners.

Every time the phone rings, all three jump for it, until Frank and Mike turn up. Mary sisters meet Mike and recognise him for a regular spot on the BBC on medicine that he presents. Mary throws herself to her knees, and after having besought him to medicate her, she insists that she is in grief, although earlier in the film she showed indifference to her mother’s death. The next morning, Mary and Mike have a sexual interlude in the woods. Afterwards, she tells him she thinks she’s pregnant, but discovers he had a vasectomy years ago. They head back to the house, where Teresa and Catherine have benn drinking the liquor that they found as they sort out their mother's clothes to give away. They dance and frolic in her fancy dresses.

Frank finally arrives. After meeting Mike, he goes down to the pub with Teresa. She asks if he’s been having an affair, only to find out he wants to quit selling supplements. Instead he wants to buy and run a pub, which angers her. Teresa concludes he hasn’t been upfront their whole relationship.

When Frank and Teresa get back, everyone witnesses Catherine being dumped on the phone by Javier. In tears she says how lonely she is, explaining she gets taken advantage of, having slept with 78 different men to date. Later on, when Frank is trying to rest Catherine tries to get his sympathy, and makes a pass.

The two couples walk into town to the pub. After some whisky, Teresa very loudly embarrasses them all. On their return, she talks about Mary’s teenage pregnancy, which no one else there knew about. Mike and Mary talk, and she reveals that the container she’s seeking contains the birth certificate for the child, Patrick. She’s hoping to make herself accessible in case her now-adult son wanted contact. Mike makes it clear he doesn’t want any more children.

In the middle of the night Violet guides Mary to seek the tin in the garage. Teresa finds her and takes it, as she doesn't want her to see all the contents until the funeral the next day. Upon her insistence for details, it is revealed that Patrick died at 13 falling from a cliff.

Mary had remembered her mother as brutal who, rather than stand by her when she became pregnant at 14, shouted at her and slapped her. She had held that moment in her mind, which had festered over the years until she hated her. But her memory plays tricks on her and it is not until finding the clipping that she remembers after the slap she had embraced and supported her.

== Cast ==
- Julie Walters as Teresa
- John Hannah as Mike
- Joanne Whalley as Mary
- Victoria Hamilton as Catherine
- Tom Wilkinson as Frank
- Patricia Hodge as Mother

== Reception ==
The BBC gave it 2 out of 5, calling it a mixed bag, criticizing the clumsy attempts to bring the story outside at every opportunity. Variety praised the chemistry of the cast but was critical of the "uninflected direction".
