= David Solkin =

Canadian art historian (born 1951)

David Hersh Solkin, FBA (born Montreal, 16 March 1951) is the Walter H. Annenberg Professor of the History of Art at the Courtauld Institute, which he joined in 1986. In 2007, Solkin became the institute's first dean and deputy director. Solkin is an expert in the art of J. M. W. Turner.

He was educated at Harvard College (AB), The Courtauld Institute of Art (MA) and Yale University (PhD, 1978).

In 2002, Solkin was awarded the William M. B. Berger Prize for the exhibition and catalogue Art on The Line: The Royal Academy Exhibitions at Somerset House 1780–1836 (The Courtauld Gallery, London, 2001–2).

== Selected publications ==
- Richard Wilson: The Landscape of Reaction, London: Tate Gallery, 1982.
- Painting for Money: The Visual Arts and the Public Sphere in Eighteenth-Century England, New Haven & London: Yale University Press, 1993.
- Painting out of the Ordinary: Modernity and the Art of Everyday Life in Early Nineteenth-Century Britain, Yale University Press, New Haven and London, 2008. ISBN 978-0-300-14061-3.
- Turner and the Masters, Tate, London, 2009. Ed. and co-author.
- "Conquest, usurpation, wealth, luxury, famine: Mortimer's Banditti and the Anxieties of Empire", in Art and the British Empire, Timothy Barringer, Geoffrey Quilley and Douglas Fordham eds., Manchester University Press, Manchester 2006, 120–38.
- "Joseph Wright of Derby and the Sublime Art of Labor" in Representations 83 (Summer 2003), pp. 167–94 .
