= Shelagh Stephenson =

English playwright and actress

Shelagh Stephenson is an English playwright and actress.

== Background and education ==
Stephenson was born in Tynemouth, Northumberland in 1955. She read drama at Manchester University.

== Career ==
=== Acting ===
Stephenson worked as an actress with the Royal Shakespeare Company and in bit parts in television. She appeared in Coronation Street in 1981 as the minor character Sandra Webb. She has subsequently had parts in Rumpole's Return, Sapphire & Steel, The Gentle Touch, The Adventures of Sherlock Holmes, Boon, Paradise Postponed and Big Deal.

=== Plays ===
Stephenson's stage plays include The Memory of Water (1997), An Experiment with an Air Pump, Ancient Lights, Five Kinds of Silence (radio play 1996; stage play 2000), Mappa Mundi (2002), Harriet Martineau and The Long Road (2008) which was written in collaboration with the UK-based charity, The Forgiveness Project, to critical acclaim.

Her plays frequently deal with new advances in science, such as the concept in the title of her first stage play, and include commentary on pseudoscientific fads such as urine therapy or phrenology as in her play on Harriet Martineau. Methuen Publishing Ltd published a collected edition of all four of these Stephenson plays in 2003.

An Experiment with an Air Pump was revived in 2009 at Hampstead Theatre, where the original production appeared in 1998 after premiering at the Royal Exchange, Manchester; the play has been since been revived at the universities of San Diego and New Orleans, the English Theatre, Berlin, the University of Waterloo and the Giant Olive Theatre Company, in London. Harriet Martineau was performed by Live Theatre in November 2016.

=== Radio ===
In the late 1980s, Stephenson was a scriptwriter on BBC Radio 4's drama series Citizens. Her original plays for BBC Radio include Lethal Cocktails, 1989; Darling Peidi, 1993; The Anatomical Venus, 1994; Five Kinds of Silence, 1996, which received the Writers Guild Award for Best Original Drama; Baby Blue, 1998; Through a Glass, Darkly, 2004; Life is a Dream, 2004; Nemesis, 2005; and The People’s Princess, 2008. She is also the writer of an occasional therapy comedy series on Woman's Hour called How Does That Make You Feel?, which began in 2010 and reached its 10th season in 2018.

A radio version of her stage play An Experiment with an Air Pump was broadcast on BBC Radio 3 in 2001.

In 2002, she adapted Françoise Sagan's Bonjour Tristesse for BBC Radio 4.

Her play Broken English was first broadcast on BBC Radio 4 in September 2020, and repeated on BBC Radio 4 Extra in January 2025.

=== Film ===
The Memory of Water was made into a film called Before You Go in 2002 starring Julie Walters and Tom Wilkinson and directed by Lewis Gilbert.

=== TV ===
Stephenson has writing credits for Downton Abbey, Season 1, Episode 4.
