= The Captive King =

Drawing by Joseph Wright of Derby

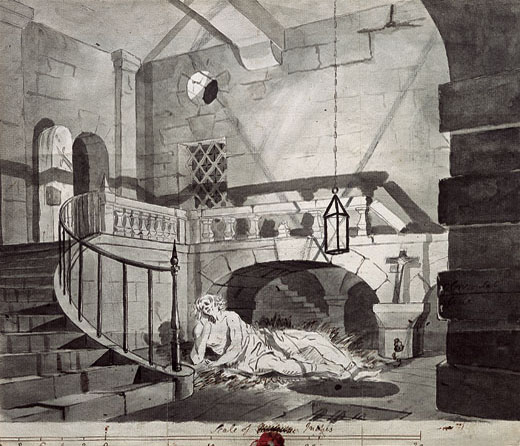
- Artist: Joseph Wright of Derby
- Year: 1772
- Dimensions: 33.6 cm × 39.5 cm (13.2 in × 15.6 in)
- Location: Derby Museum and Art Gallery; Derby

The Captive King is a sketch by Joseph Wright of Derby completed in 1772 or 1773. It depicts the French nobleman Guy de Lusignan held prisoner by Saladin. The sketch is thought to have been a preparation for the now-lost painting Guy de Lusignan in Prison.

== Description ==
The sketch was titled The Captive King and it shows the French nobleman Guy de Lusignan held prisoner by Saladin. Lusignan had fought Saladin on 4 July 1187 and was taken prisoner following his army's defeat. It is said that the relics from the true cross were also lost during this battle. Lusignan, who came from near Poitiers in France, had become the King of Jerusalem as a result of his marriage to Sibylla of Jerusalem. Eventually, Lusignan was released by Saladin and went on to rule Cyprus. The sketch by Joseph Wright contains annotations by his friend Peter Perez Burdett. Wright had taken lessons from Burdett in perspective and consulted him over the construction of his paintings.

== History ==
The sketch was one of at least three that Wright drew before making two similar paintings concerning the captured crusader. The sketches were sent to Peter Perez Burdett in Liverpool for his comment in the winter of 1772–73 before Wright created the smaller of the paintings, which was exhibited at the Society of Artists in 1773 with a version of The Blacksmith's Shop. Wright had hoped to sell a version of The Captive King to Markgraf Karl Friedrich in 1774. Friedrich was to eventually employ Burdett when he moved to Germany to avoid his debts – including money owed to Wright. A larger version of the painting that was 40 inches by 50 inches was in the possession of Wright's son-in-law after it was sold in 1810. There is no report of it after that in Nicolson's book on Wright's work. In 1774 and 1778 Wright created paintings with a similar subject of a man abandoned in prison, but the later paintings concern an extract from a contemporary novel. The last of these was Sterne's Captive, exhibited in 1778.
