= Ophioglossolambis itsumiae =

Scientific classification
- Kingdom: Animalia
- Phylum: Mollusca
- Class: Gastropoda
- Subclass: Caenogastropoda
- Order: Littorinimorpha
- Family: Strombidae
- Genus: Ophioglossolambis
- Species: O. itsumiae

Binomial name
- Ophioglossolambis itsumiae Lum, 2021

Species of sea snail

Ophioglossolambis itsumiae is a species of true conch from the Mascarene Islands (Mauritius, Rodrigues, and Réunion) and Saint Brandon (also known as Cargados Carajos) Shoals in the western Indian Ocean.

O. itsumiae can be distinguished from the closely allied O. digitata by way of its broader shape, compact spire, pronounced knobs, long siphonal canal and labral spines, and yellowish coloration lacking defined patterning. It differs markedly from O. violacea (endemic to Mauritius and Saint Brandon), which has a distinct violet throat, white ground color with tan blotches, and smaller size.

Lum theorized that the Mascarene O. itsumiae and O. violacea are descended from ancestral O. digitata, which has a broader distribution in E. Africa and occasionally appears in Mascarene waters.
