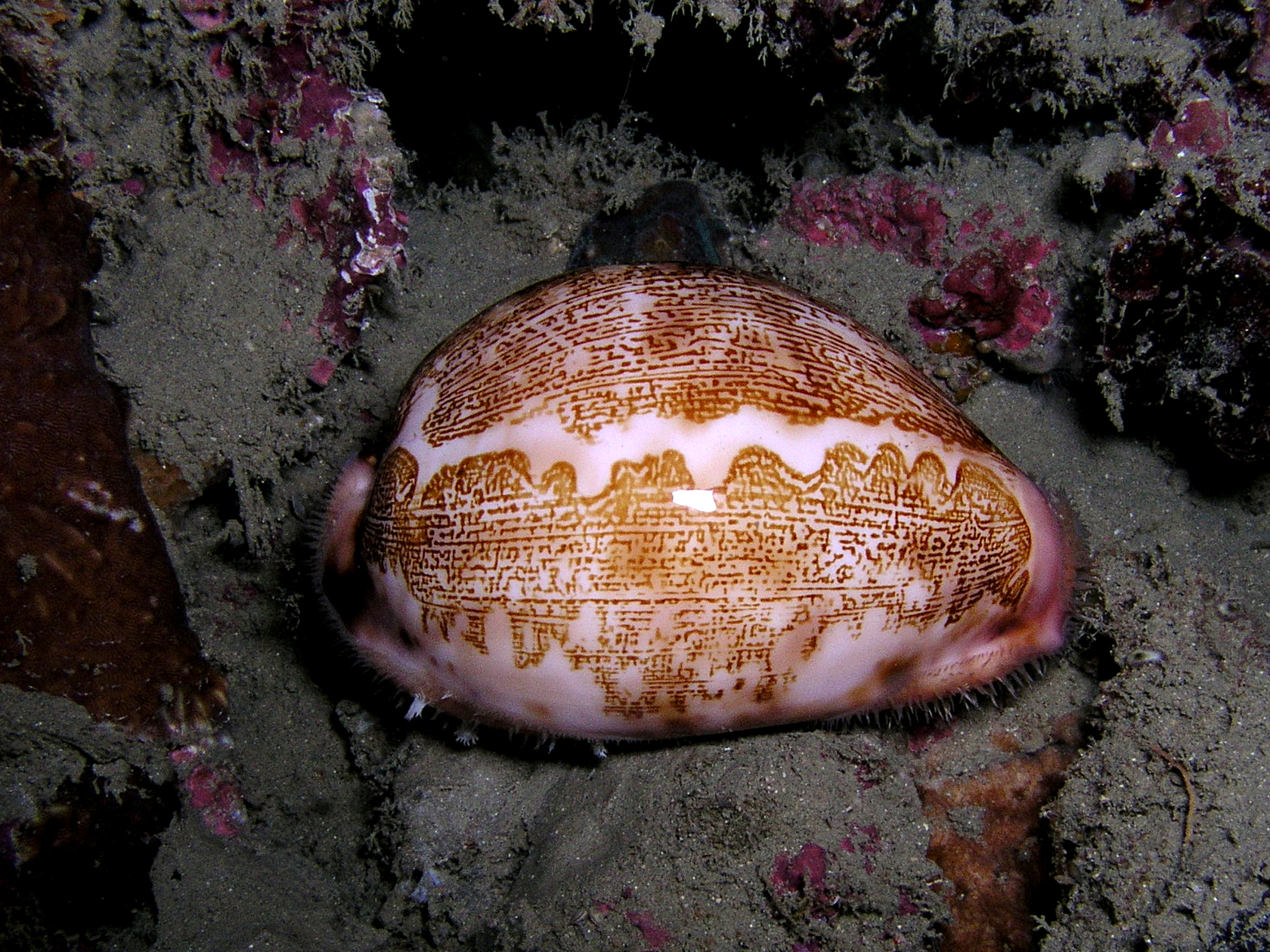
- A live individual of Leporicypraea mappa with the mantle mostly retracted
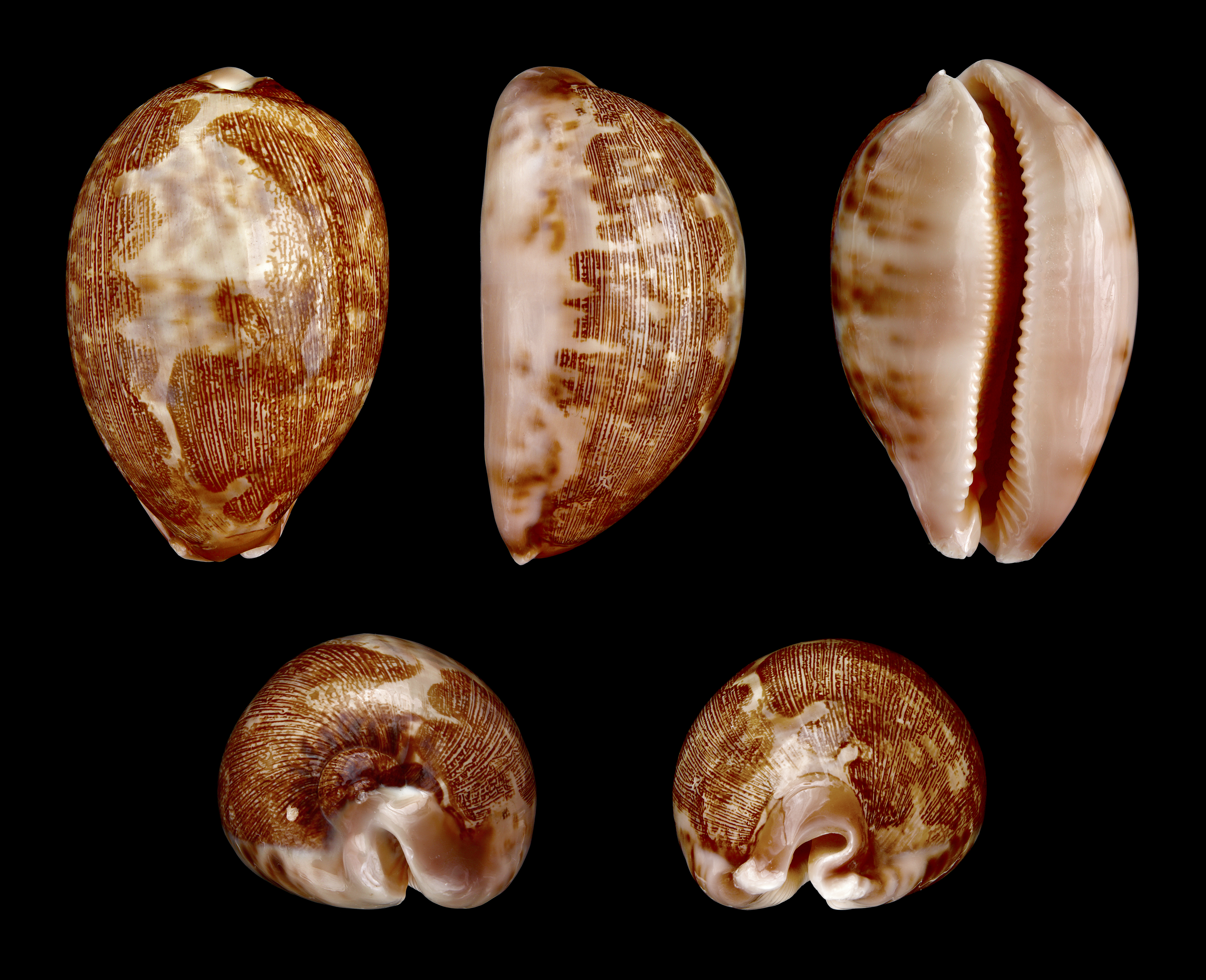
- Five views of a shell of Leporicypraea mappa

Scientific classification
- Kingdom: Animalia
- Phylum: Mollusca
- Class: Gastropoda
- Subclass: Caenogastropoda
- Order: Littorinimorpha
- Family: Cypraeidae
- Genus: Leporicypraea; Iredale, 1930

Type species
- Cypraea mappa Linnaeus, 1758

Synonyms
- Cypraea (Leporicypraea) Iredale, 1930

= Leporicypraea =

Genus of gastropods

Leporicypraea is a genus of sea snails, marine gastropod mollusks in the family Cypraeidae, the cowries.

Species within this genus are commonly found in the Indo-Pacific region.

== Species ==
Species of Leporicypraea include:

- Leporicypraea geographica (Schilder & Schilder, 1933)
- Leporicypraea mappa (Linnaeus, 1758)
- Leporicypraea rosea (Gray, 1824)
- Leporicypraea valentia (Perry, 1811)

Nomen dubium

- Leporicypraea alga (Perry, 1811)
