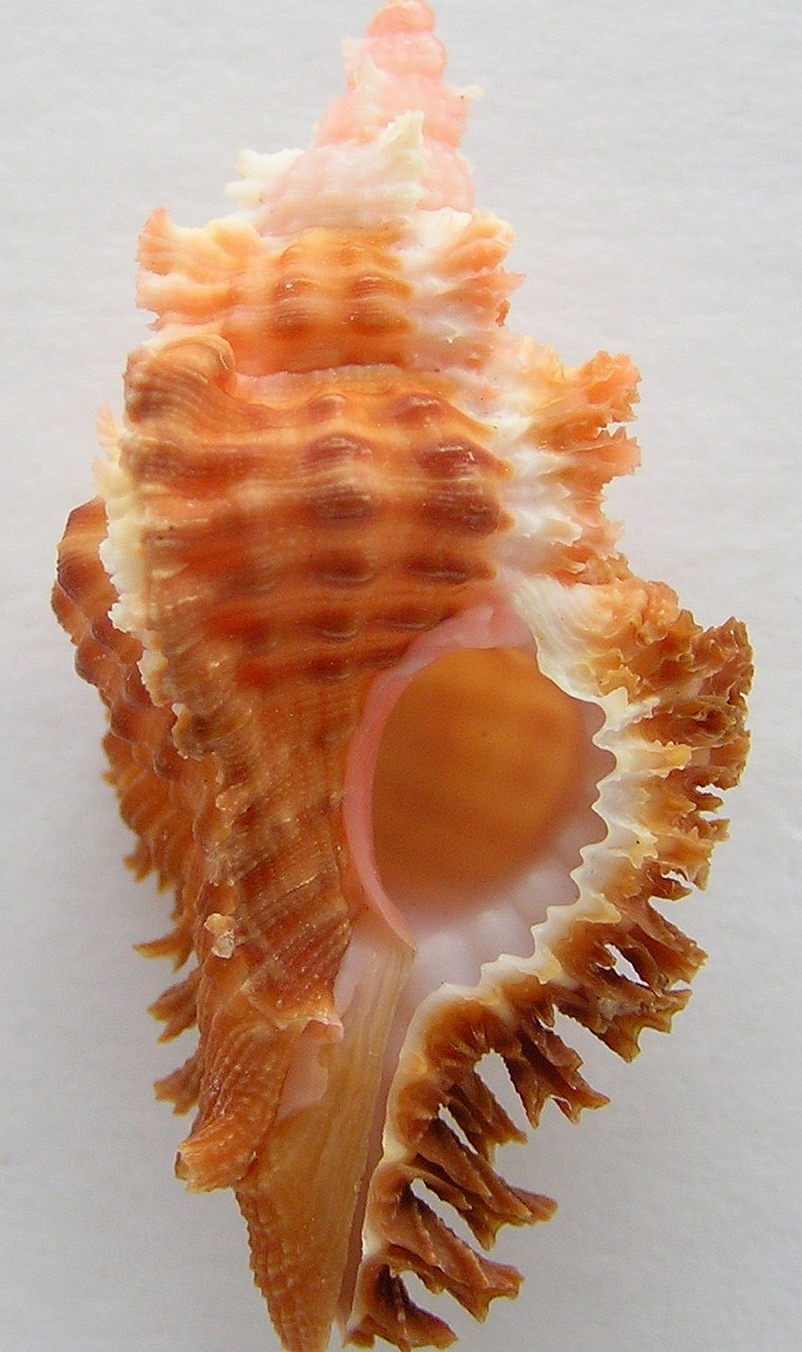
- Apertural view of Chicoreus denudatus

Scientific classification
- Kingdom: Animalia
- Phylum: Mollusca
- Class: Gastropoda
- Subclass: Caenogastropoda
- Order: Neogastropoda
- Family: Muricidae
- Genus: Chicoreus
- Species: C. denudatus

Binomial name
- Chicoreus denudatus (Perry, 1811)

Synonyms
- Chicoreus (Triplex) denudatus (Perry, 1811); Murex australis Quoy & Gaimard, 1833; Murex palmiferus Sowerby, 1841; Torvamurex denudatus (Perry, 1811); Torvamurex denudatus immunitus Iredale, 1936; Torvamurex extraneus Iredale, 1936; Triplex denudatus Perry, 1811 (basionym); Triplex frondosa Perry, 1811

= Chicoreus denudatus =

Species of gastropod

Chicoreus denudatus, common name the branch-bearing murex, is a species of sea snail, a marine gastropod mollusk in the family Muricidae, the murex snails or rock snails.

== Description ==
The size of an adult shell varies between 25 mm and 75 mm.

== Distribution ==
This marine species occurs along Queensland and northern Tasmania from the intertidal zone to depths up to 100 m, but most commonly in the subtidal zone.
