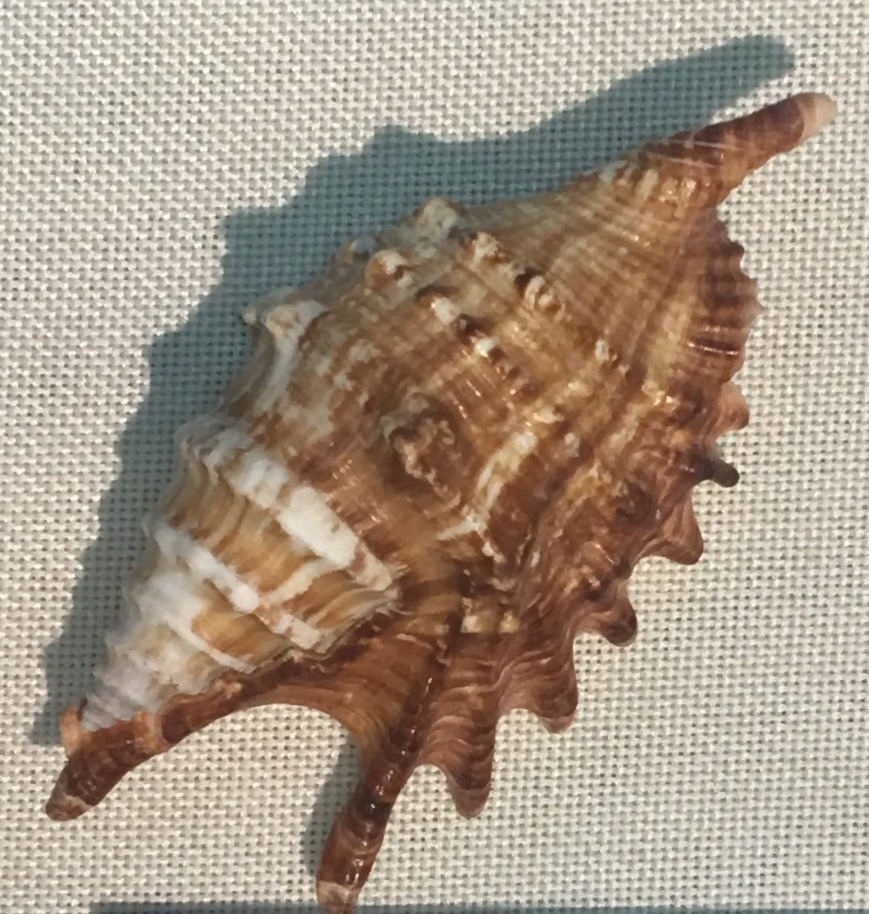
- Shell of Ophioglossolambis digitata at the Natural History Museum of Guangxi

Scientific classification
- Kingdom: Animalia
- Phylum: Mollusca
- Class: Gastropoda
- Subclass: Caenogastropoda
- Order: Littorinimorpha
- Superfamily: Stromboidea
- Family: Strombidae
- Genus: Ophioglossolambis; Dekkers, 2012

Type species
- Strombus digitatus Perry, 1811

Synonyms
- Afristrombus Bandel, 2007; Thetystrombus Dekkers, 2008

= Ophioglossolambis =

Genus of gastropods

Ophioglossolambis is a genus of sea snails, marine gastropod mollusks in the family Strombidae, the true conchs.

== Species ==
Species within the genus Ophioglossolambis include:

- Ophioglossolambis digitata (Perry, 1811)
- Ophioglossolambis itsumiae Lum, 2021
- Ophioglossolambis violacea (Swainson, 1821)
