= L. digitata =

L. digitata may refer to:

- Lambis digitata, a sea snail species
- Laminaria digitata, the oarweed, a large brown alga species found in the sublittoral zone of the northern Atlantic Ocean
