= Clem$ =

- Born: 1974 (age 51–52); France
- Known for: Pop art
- Website: clemsart.com

Clem$ is a French pop artist. His works depict his obsession with characters that he creates. His works include paintings and objects that belong to modern day Avantpop Art. His works have been exhibited around the world, including Miami, London, New York, Paris and Tel Aviv. Clem$'s solo exhibition was featured on EFIFO – Art Magazine and on Oh-SO-ARTY (an Israeli Guide to Contemporary Art Scene resource).

== Early life ==
Born in 1974, Clem$ started drawing cartoons at an early age, then stopping for a number of years. Later on he worked on electronic music. Self-taught, he eventually returned to his childhood passion, eventually devoting himself entirely to art work.

== Arts career ==
Clem$ is an iconoclast. Popular figures of past and contemporary society form his subjects. His composite paintings are set in a range of colors. Impregnated with pop and urban culture, his works witness and denounce the excesses of the time. Clem$ main support is canvas. He paints with acrylic and brushes after sketching with charcoal.

His works include portraits of David Ben-Gurion, Moshe Dayan, Golda Meir, Yitzhak Rabin, Ray Charles, Mickey Mouse and others. Most of his works are in the form of cartoons and comic images that depict local characters and celebrities in American culture. He also customizes objects such as scooters, guitars, trios of skateboards, fridges, chairs, and sneakers.

== See also ==
- Avantpop
- Art exhibition
- Solo show (art exhibition)
