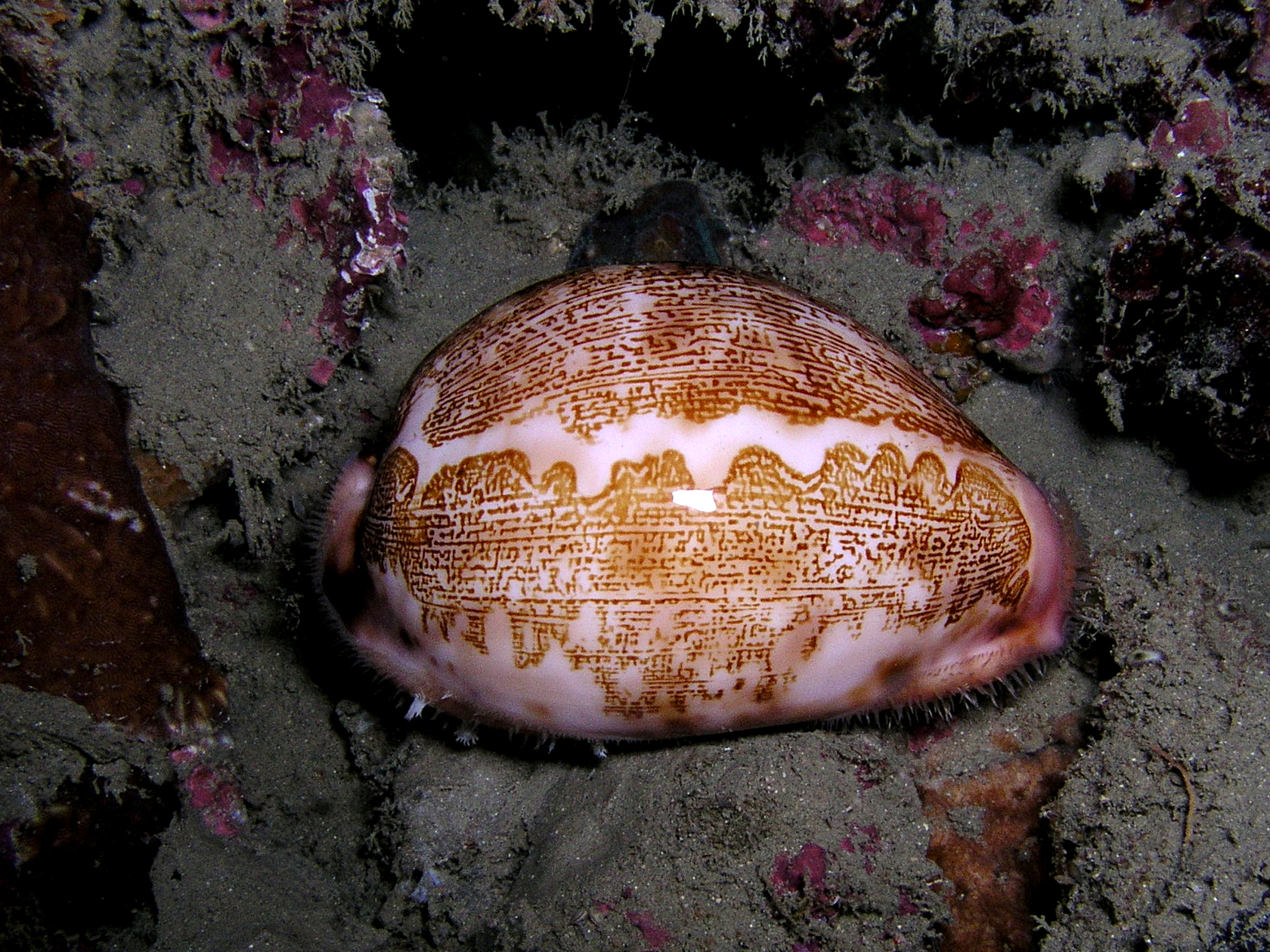
- A live individual of Leporicypraea mappa with the mantle mostly retracted
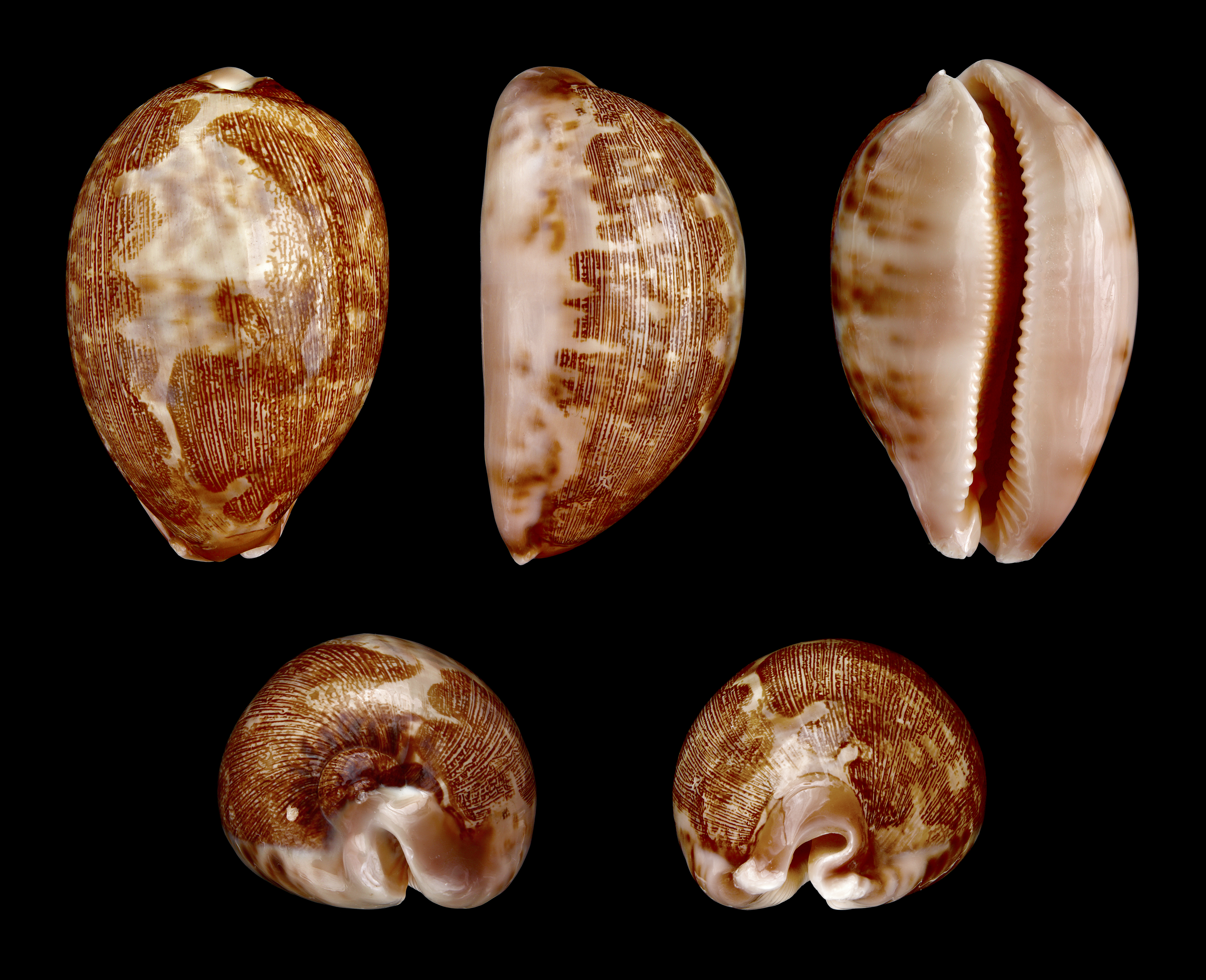
- Five views of a shell of Leporicypraea mappa

Scientific classification
- Kingdom: Animalia
- Phylum: Mollusca
- Class: Gastropoda
- Subclass: Caenogastropoda
- Order: Littorinimorpha
- Family: Cypraeidae
- Genus: Leporicypraea
- Species: L. mappa

Binomial name
- Leporicypraea mappa (Linnaeus, 1758)

Synonyms
- Cypraea mappa (Linnaeus, 1758); Cypraea alga Perry, 1811; Cypraea mappa var. rosea Gray, 1824; Cypraea mappa var. subsignata Melvill, 1888; Cypraea montosa Roberts, 1870; Cypraea montrouzieri Dautzenberg, 1903; Leporicypraea cinereoviridescens Bouge, 1961; Leporicypraea mappa rewa Steadman & Cotton, 1943; Leporicypraea viridis Kenyon, 1902; Mauritia mappa geographica Schilder & Schilder, 1933

= Leporicypraea mappa =

Species of gastropod

Leporicypraea mappa (previously known as Cypraea mappa), common name the map cowry, is a species of large sea snail, a cowry, a marine gastropod mollusk in the family Cypraeidae, the cowries.

This is considered an economically important species in the Indo-West Pacific, where it is usually collected both for food and for shell trading.

The map cowry was named on the basis of its distinct color pattern, because of the longitudinal lines and the easily distinguishable and sinuous mantle groove, which creates a resemblance to ancient maps.

== Taxonomy ==
Leporicypraea mappa was previously subordinated into the genus Cypraea. In the currently most accepted taxonomy of the Cypraeidae by Lorenz & Hubert (2000), this species is considered to be within the genus Leporicypraea, with several subspecies. Recently, the division of this taxon in two or even three nominal species based on morphological and molecular characters has been suggested.

=== Subspecies ===
Subspecies of Leporicypraea mappa include according to the World Register of Marine Species (WoRMS):

- Leporicypraea mappa admirabilis Lorenz, 2002
- Leporicypraea mappa aliwalensis Lorenz, 2002
- Leporicypraea mappa mappa (Linnaeus, 1758)

The Indo-Pacific Molluscan also includes:

- Leporicypraea mappa rosea (Gray, 1824)
- Leporicypraea mappa panerythra (Melvill, 1888)
- Leporicypraea mappa viridis (Kenyon, 1902)
- Leporicypraea mappa geographica (Schilder & Schilder, 1933)

== Shell description ==
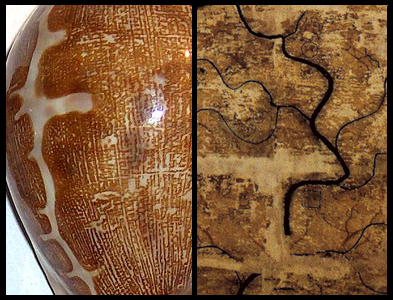
Comparing the color pattern of the shell of Leporicypraea mappa (left) and an ancient Chinese topographic map (right)

The maximum shell length of this species is up to 10 cm, but it more commonly grows up to about 8 cm. The shell of Leporicypraea mappa is globose, with a near elliptical, slightly elongate outline. In affinity to other Cypraeidae, the aperture of the shell is very narrow, and relatively long. Both the inner and outer lips are ornamented with arrays of small teeth, though the teeth of the outer lip are shorter and stronger in comparison to the teeth of the inner lip, which are thinner and more numerous. Its dorsal side is normally inflated, while the ventral side of the shell is slightly concave.

The shell is colored white or cream, with several longitudinal brown lines, which are sometimes interrupted by circular empty spaces. The cursory dorsal mantle groove line is dissimilar to the shells general color pattern, completely devoid of lines, thus easily perceivable. Its sinuous appearance, with several branches and notches, makes it a diagnostic character for this species. This exotic color pattern gives an appearance similar to that of ancient maps, hence the specific and common names. Both the ventral side of the shell and the labral teeth may vary greatly in color, assuming shades of white or cream, or even purple, brown, orange or pink.

== Distribution ==
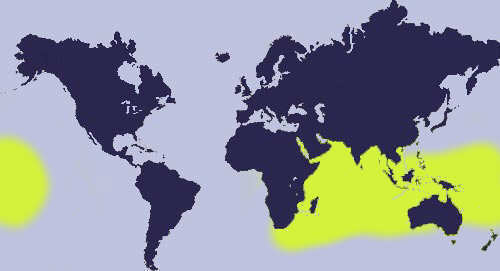
A map of the distribution of Leporicypraea mappa

Leporicypraea mappa is widely distributed in the Indo-Pacific. It is present in many regions, including East Africa, Madagascar, southeastern Red Sea, eastern Polynesia, southern Japan, Australia and New Caledonia.

This exceptionally wide range may possibly be an artifact. Some conchologists claim that the taxonomy of the species is poorly resolved; if the map cowry is discovered to be cryptic species complex, then this could drastically change the range of its distribution.

== Ecology ==
=== Habitat ===
The map cowry lives in the intertidal and sublittoral zones, usually in coral reef areas, dwelling under slabs and stones at depths of 45 m.

== Human uses ==
The flesh of the map cowry is edible, and it is commonly collected by local fishermen for food and shell trading wherever it occurs. It is sold in fish markets in the northern Philippines. The shells of Cypraea mappa (as it was previously known) were considered rare, exotic and beautiful, and were highly prized by private shell collectors in the late 1950s.
