= John Raphael Smith =

English painter and mezzotinter (1751–1812)

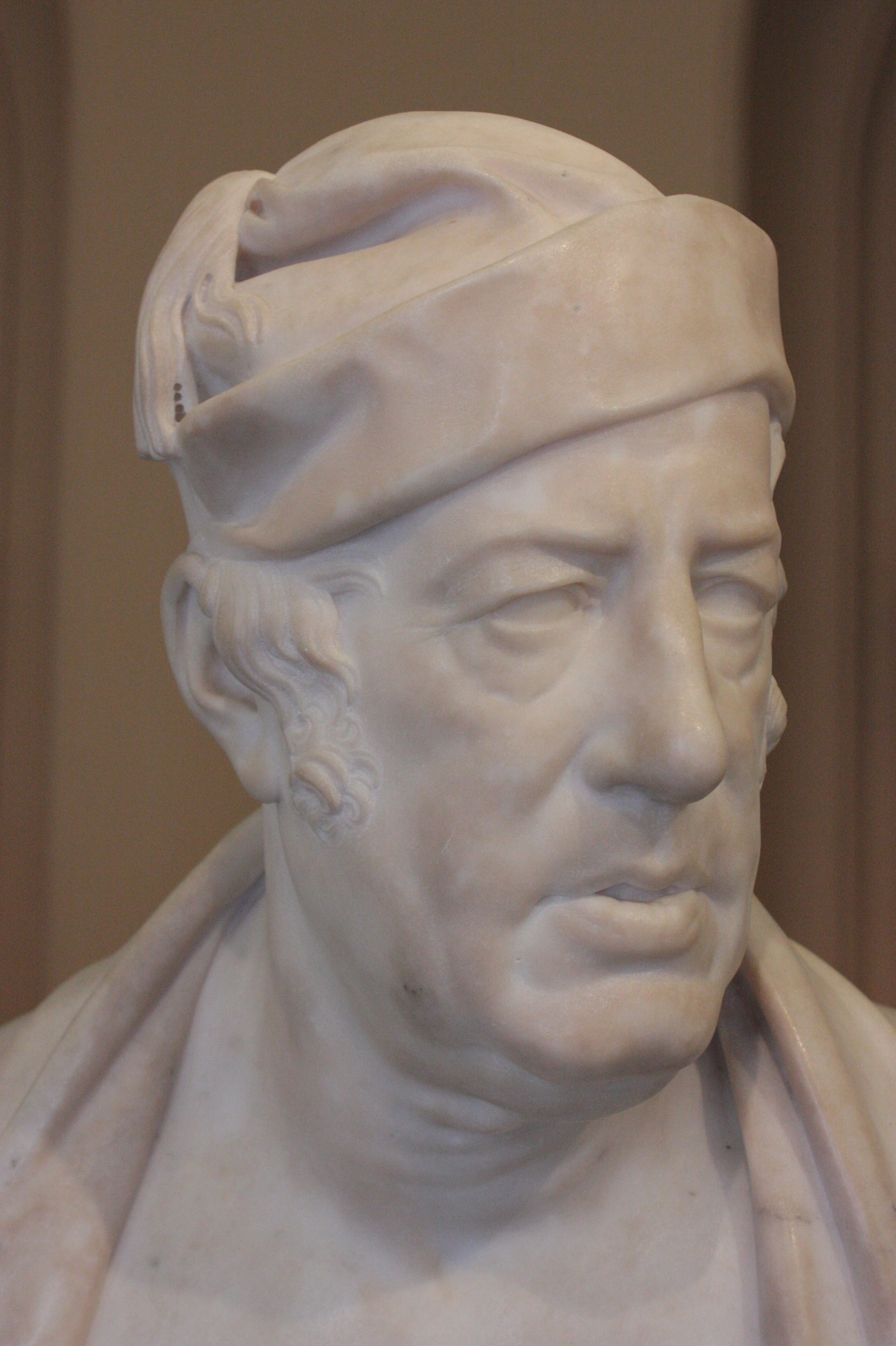
- Sculpture by Sir Francis Chantrey in the V&A
- Born: Derby, Derbyshire, England
- Baptised: 25 May 1751
- Died: 2 March 1812 (aged 60); Doncaster, England
- Occupations: painter and mezzotint engraver
- Children: John
- Parent: Thomas Smith

John Raphael Smith (25 May 1751 – 2 March 1812) was a British painter and mezzotinter. He was the son of the landscape painter Thomas Smith and the father of John Rubens Smith, a painter who emigrated to the United States.

== Biography ==
John Raphael Smith was baptised at St Alkmund's Church in Derby, England, on 25 May 1751. He was named after the High Renaissance artist Raphael. His mother was Hannah Silvester and his father was the painter Thomas Smith. He was able to secure an apprentice to a linen-draper in the city after a brief education at Derby School. His elder brother, Thomas Corregio Smith (1743–1811), was also a painter.

Determined to pursue a print-making business in London, in 1767 he moved to the capital, making additional income from production of miniatures. Almost immediately he met Ann Darlow, he proposed and they were married on 20 May 1768 at the Chapel of Savoy.

Then he turned to engraving: his most successful mezzotint of Pascal Poali, after Henry Benbridge launched his career. He executed his plate of the Public Ledger, which proved most popular, and was followed by his mezzotints of Edwin the Minstrel (a portrait of Thomas Haden) after Wright of Derby, and Mercury Inventing the Lyre, after Barry.

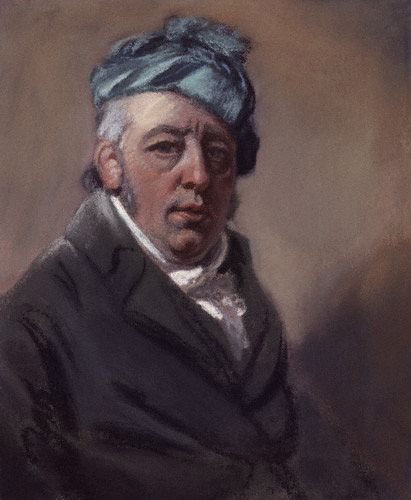
Self-Portrait, c. 1807, pastel, National Portrait Gallery, London

He reproduced some forty works of Sir Joshua Reynolds, some of which ranked among the masterpieces of mezzotint. Notable among these feats was one of Mr Banks, after a portrait by the Royal Academician Benjamin West that was exhibited at the Society of Artists in 1773. In 1778, Smith was commissioned to complete a mezzotint engraving by John Milnes following his purchase of a painting and all known engravings of the work of Joseph Wright of Derby. The painting was called The Captive and the engraving was used to make just twenty impressions before it was destroyed. One of these rare engravings is in Smith's home town at the Derby Museum and Art Gallery.

Reynolds painted all Society, but Smith's mezzotints of Mrs Carnac (1778) and Lieutenant-Colonel Banastre Tarleton (1782) are outstanding examples of famous Georgians. Tarleton's reputation as a ruthless cavalry officer in the American campaign was illustrative of Smith's enduring family links to the New World. Adding to his artistic pursuits an extensive connexion as a print-dealer and publisher, he would soon have acquired wealth had it not been for his dissipated habits. Smith knew the theatre, having a keen eye for the dramatic flourish, with a sense of stagecraft, a Promenade at Carlisle House, followed by a mezzotint exhibited in 1782 at the Free Society of Artists.

Mezzotints of George Romney's portrait of The Children of Earl Gower and Thomas Gainsborough's George, Prince of Wales catapulted him into the Royal Household, appointed in 1784 as Mezzotint Engraver to the Prince of Wales. Other successful pieces followed with The Weird Sisters after Henry Fuseli (1785), and a Widow of an Indian Chief (1789), after Joseph Wright of Derby. He was a boon companion of George Morland, whose figure-pieces included mezzotints repository at the British Museum, and frequent exhibitions throughout his career at the Society of Artists. In the intervening periods he showed oils, chalk and pastels at the Royal Academy in Piccadilly, for example his mezzotint of 1785 of the Credulous Lady and Astrologer. In 1803, he had a special exhibition of oils at the British School in Berners Street, Piccadilly. Of his complete oeuvres, over 400 works of mezzotint and stipple, included 120 genre and satirical works about ordinary life. Ladies in Fashionable Dresses by Bowles portrayed, according to one critic, a group of prostitutes.

Smith became a London publisher from 1781, including among his clients the radical writer and artist William Blake. A prolific mentor of apprentices, he shared plates with at least thirty other London printers. In this group was J. M. W. Turner, Charles H. Hodges, William Ward, Thomas Girtin and James Ward, who were among his registered pupils were William Hilton, Charles Howard Hodges, Christiaan Josi, Samuel William Reynolds, James and William Ward (engraver), and Peter de Wint.

As a mezzotint engraver, Smith is widely regarded as one of the leading practitioners of his time. His prints were noted for their delicacy, strong draftsmanship, and effective rendering of tonal qualities and colour. Among his small full-length portraits in pastel and crayon, the portrait of Charles James Fox, the Whig leader, is often considered one of his finest works and was exhibited at the Royal Academy in 1802. Other notable portraits include those of Horne Tooke, Sir Francis Burdett, and the Duke of Devonshire with his family, reflecting his abilities as a draughtsman and painter. Smith was also recognized for his extensive knowledge of the principles and history of art and was regarded by contemporaries as an engaging conversationalist.

After a divorce from Ann, on the grounds of adultery, he lived with Emma Johnston, mother of his child, artist Emma Smith (1783–1853); he made an exceptional study of her in 1783. The grandchildren were also distinguished: Julian, Lord Pauncefote was Britain's first fully-fledged Ambassador to United States. His sister Eliza Aders (1785–1857) was a hostess and artist.

Smith's third relationship was with Hannah Croome (1757–1829), by whom he had another two children, who survived him. In 1793, he opened the Morland Gallery in King Street, Covent Garden, whence he issued catalogues of his prints. By 1798, he had listed over 302 publications in addition to his prints. He painted subject-pictures such as the Unsuspecting Maid, Inattention and the Moralist, exhibiting in the Royal Academy from 1779 to 1790. Upon the decline of his business as a printseller he made a tour through the north and midland counties of England, producing much hasty and indifferent work, and settled in Doncaster. The artistic merit of the sculptor Sir Francis Leggatt Chantrey was spotted by Smith, who gave him lessons in painting. Chantry later did a bust of Smith in appreciation, that is now in the Victoria and Albert Museum, London; and there is a painting of Chantry by Smith. From 1808 Smith grew increasingly deaf. Based in Doncaster, he travelled extensively through the North of England. He died at his home there, and was buried in the parish churchyard.

Some selected portraits and mezzotint
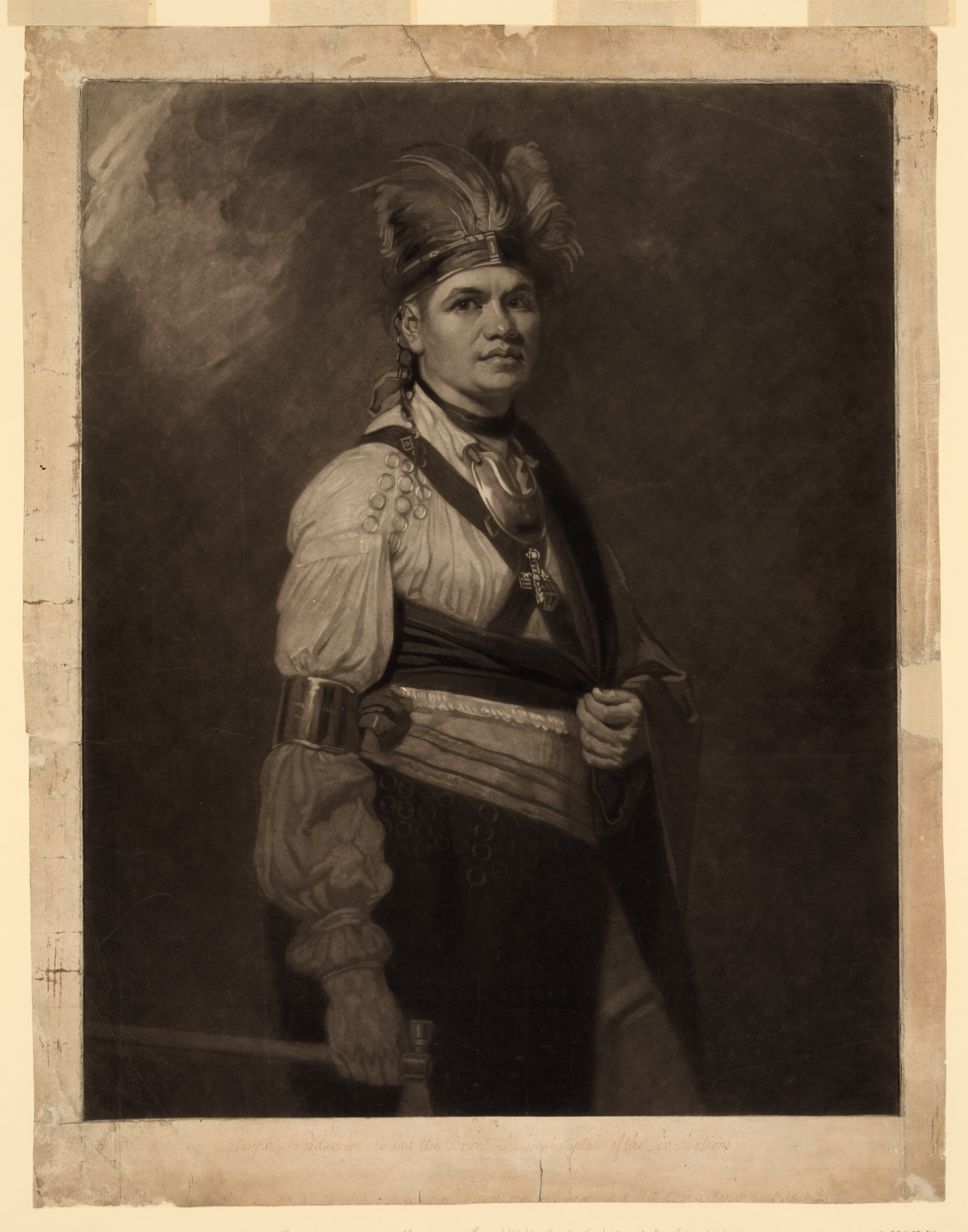
Thayendanegea or Joseph Brant, Captain of the Six Nations

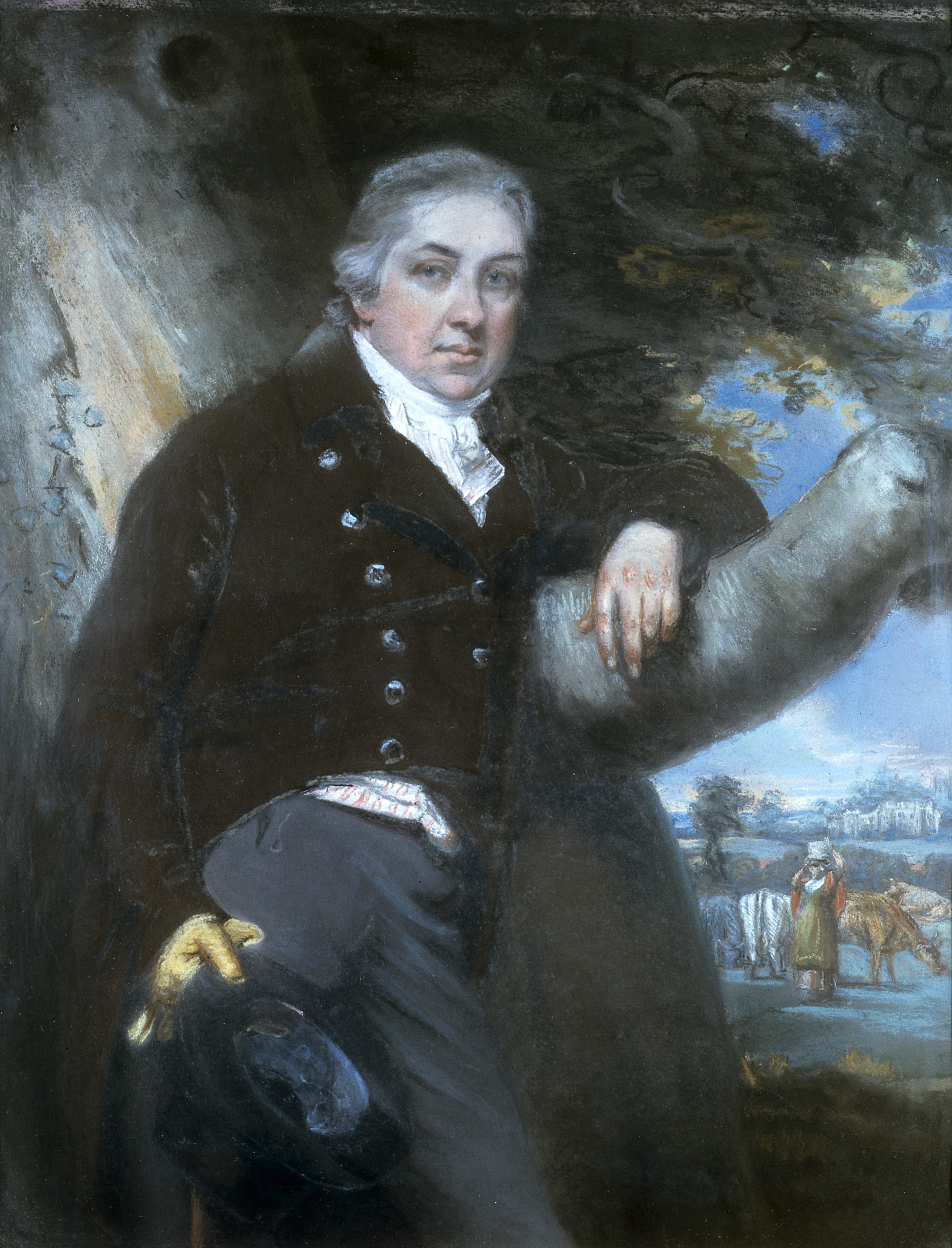
Edward Jenner

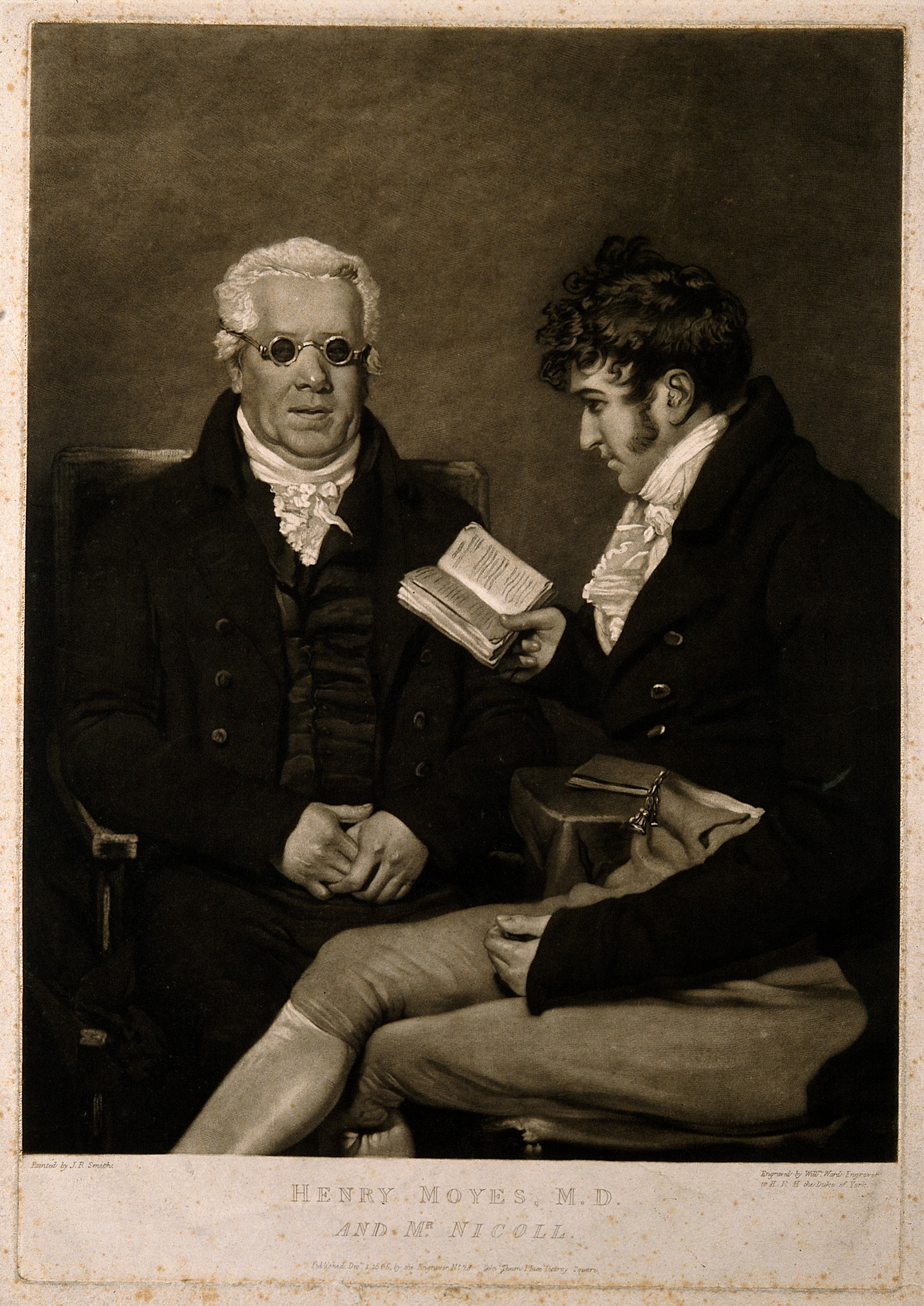
Henry Moyes
- King George III (1760)
- John Stuart, 1st Marquess of Bute (1760)
- Hon Mrs Stanhope
- Thomas King, English actor (1772)
- Mr Banks (1773)
- Chryses invoking the Vengeance of Apollo (1774)
- Augustus Montague Toplady (1777)
- Carlini, Bartolozzi and Cipriani (1778)
- Mrs Elizabeth Carnac (1778)
- Miss Brown (1778)
- Joseph Tayadaneega, the Brant, the Great Captain of the Six Nations (1779)
- Self-Portrait (1782)
- Lieutenant-colonel Banastre Tarleton (1782)
- The Weird Sisters (1785)
- Rev Charles Alcock (1785)
- The Widow's Tale
- Self-Portrait (1785-7)
- Shepherdess (1787)
- William Bentinck, Duke of Portland and Lord Edward Bentinck (1788)
- The Moralist (facsimile after JRS, 1900)
- The Widow of an Indian Chief (1789)
- Edward Heardson, cook for the Ad Libitum Society (1789)
- 'What You Will' (c1790)
- George Morland (1792)
- His Royal Highness, George, Prince of Wales (1792)
- Sir William Musgrave, 6th baronet
- Miss Chambers
- Gypsy encampment
- Edward Jenner (1800)
- Lady in a Straw Hat
- Hon Douglas Kinnaird
- Sir Francis Burdett, Bt
- Sir Benjamin, Count Rumford (c1800)
- Thomas Morton (1803)
- Thomas Hartley, Lord Mayor of York (1803)
- Colonel and Mrs Thornton (1806)
- Lieut William Collingwood, Northumberland Militia (1809)
- John Bigland, Doncaster schoolmaster (1810)
- John Horne Tooke (1811)
- Major General Benjamin Lincoln, President of the Cincinnati (1811)
- Sir Francis Leggatt Chantrey (1818)
