= The Lady in Milton's Comus =

1785 painting by Joseph Wright of Derby

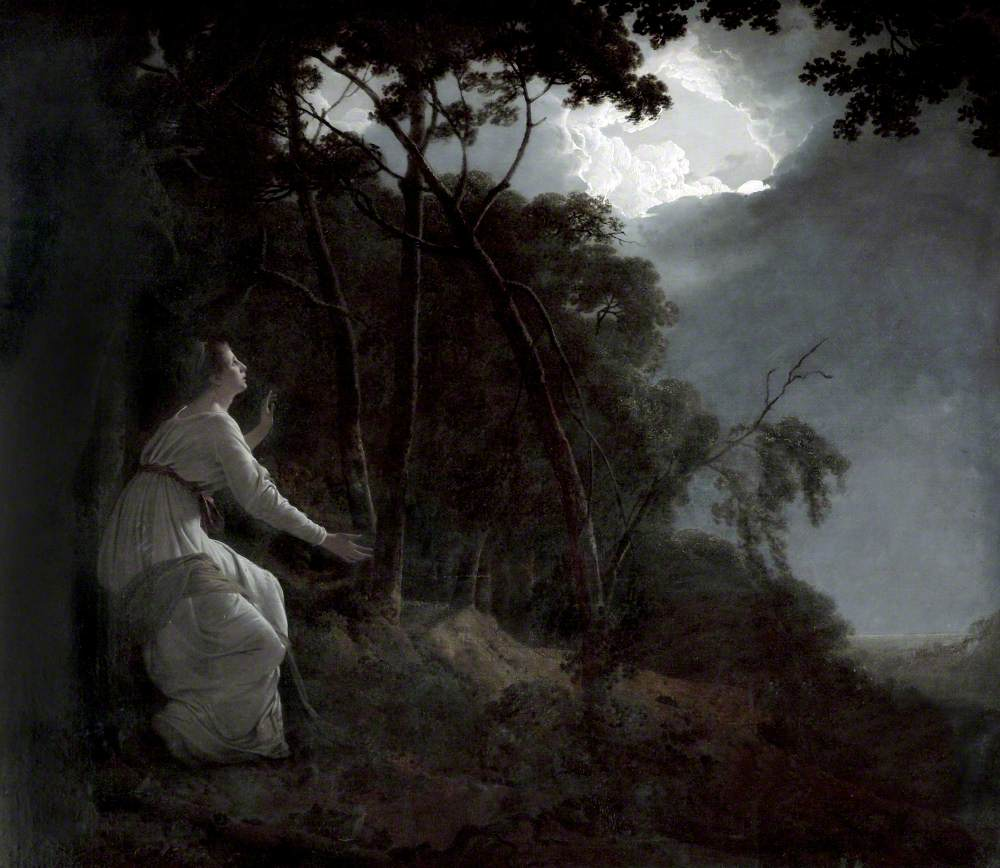
- Artist: Joseph Wright of Derby
- Year: 1785
- Type: Oil on canvas, landscape painting
- Dimensions: 101 cm × 127 cm (40 in × 50 in)
- Location: Walker Art Gallery, Liverpool

The Lady in Milton's Comus is a 1785 history painting by the British artist Joseph Wright of Derby. It is inspired by a passage from John Milton's Comus. A young woman, lost in a forest and distressed by strange noise, recovers her courage when the moon suddenly breaks through the clouds.

It was one of twenty five paintings that Wright displayed in a personal exhibition in Covent Garden in April 1785 rather than at the Summer Exhibition of 1785 held by the Royal Academy who he was in dispute with. The painting in the collection of the Walker Art Gallery in Liverpool, having been acquired in 1902.

It was the companion piece of The Indian Widow, produced the same year and now in the Derby Art Gallery.

== Bibliography ==
- Bamford, Lucy & Wallis, Jonathan. Joseph Wright of Derby. Derby Museums, 2017.
- Graciano, Andrew. Joseph Wright, Esq. Painter and Gentleman. Cambridge Scholars Publishing, 2021.
- Leach, Stephen H. Joseph Wright and the Final Farewell. Cambridge Scholars Publishing, 2022.
