= Thomas Smith (English painter) =

English painter

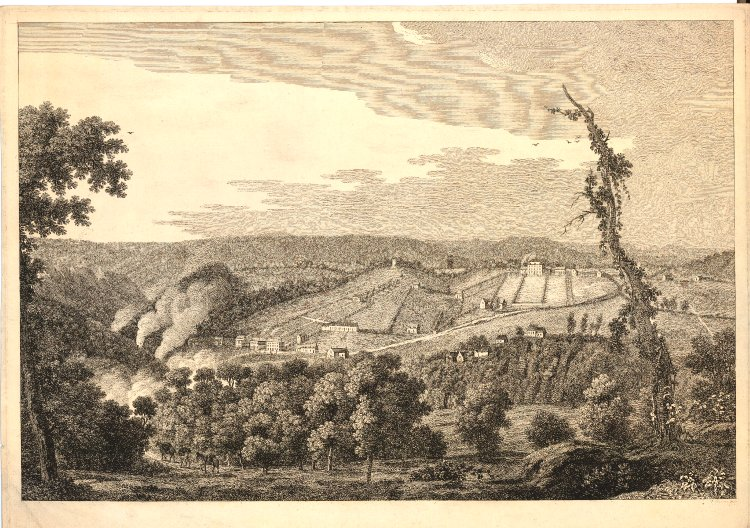
South West Prospect of Coalbrook Dale, 1758 engraving by François Vivares after Smith and George Perry

Thomas Smith (died 12 September 1767), also known as Thomas Smith of Derby, was a landscape painter and father of John Raphael Smith and miniaturist painter Thomas Corregio Smith. Smith painted many landscapes including historic houses like Chatsworth and views of the Lake District.

With George Perry he designed views of Coalbrookdale, which were engraved by François Vivares. These are among the earliest industrial landscapes.

Smith's 1751 painting "An Extensive Landscape with Hunting Party" was sold for over $67,000 at an auction at Sotheby's. He painted the picture in 1751, a year before his son was born and sixteen years before his death.

There are several of his paintings and those of his son in Derby Art Gallery and examples too in British institutions like Bradford Museum and Galleries and in the Government Art Collection.
