= Indian Widow =

Painting by Joseph Wright of Derby

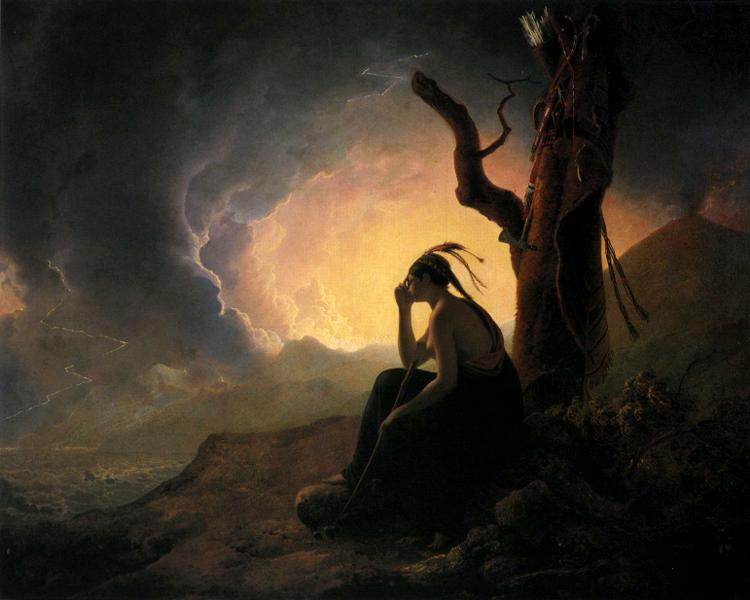
- Artist: Joseph Wright of Derby
- Year: 1783/1784
- Medium: Oil on canvas
- Dimensions: 101.6 cm × 127 cm (40.0 in × 50 in)
- Location: Derby Museum and Art Gallery, Derby

Indian Widow is a painting by Joseph Wright of Derby, completed in late 1783 or early 1784 and first shown in his solo exhibition in London in 1785. The painting is since 1961 in the collection of Derby Museum and Art Gallery.

== Description ==
Indian Widow was a title used by the painter, but a longer and more descriptive title also exists, The Widow of an Indian Chief Watching the Arms of Her Deceased Husband. According to Benedict Nicolson, in clothing the figure of the widow, Wright "has fallen back on those well-worn neo-classic draperies which served for any distressed female". Nicolson finds that other details, however, are more authentic: "the form of her head-band, the treatment of the feathers, the quilled cords and knife-sheath, and the buffalo-robe painted on the skin side show knowledge of Indian technology from at least as far west as the upper Great Lakes: this proves that Wright used authentic props". The concept of the Noble Savage, applied to Native Americans, was all the more popular in Britain in the 1780s when Americans of European origin could be regarded as rebels.

In contrast with Wright's paintings of candlelit scenes, here the main figure is seen silhouetted against sunlight and a stormy sky.

== Similar work ==
An engraving of this painting was made by another Derby artist, John Raphael Smith, in 1785. Wright painted a similar painting based on female fortitude entitled The Lady in Milton's Comus and a very near copy of the Indian Widow. The Lady in Milton's Comus is in the Walker Gallery in Liverpool whilst the near copy was lost in a fire. This painting and The Lady in Milton's Comus were displayed at Wright's exhibition in 1785. It is thought that this might be the first "solo show" in England. Wright laid out his plans for the exhibition in the same year that he refused to become a Royal Academician.

== Bibliography ==
- Nicolson, Benedict (1968). Joseph Wright of Derby: Painter of Light. Vol. 1, p. 148.
