= François Vivares =

French landscape-engraver

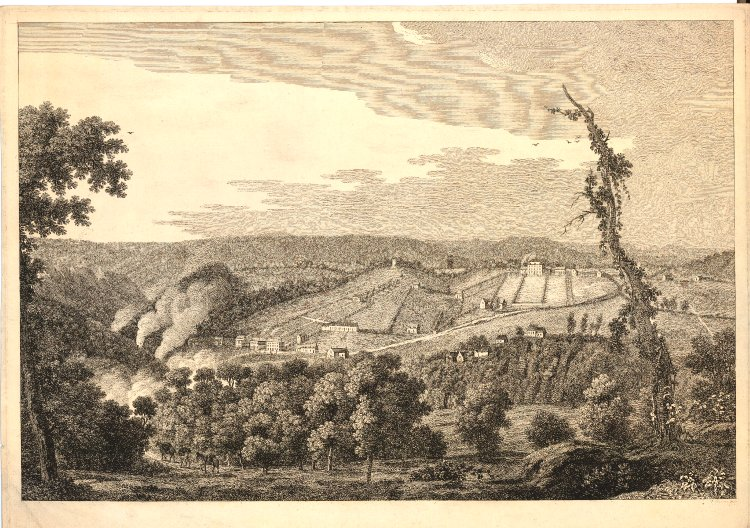
- South West Prospect of Coalbrook Dale, 1758 engraving by Vivares after Thomas Smith and George Perry
- Born: 11 July 1709; Saint-Jean-du-Bruel
- Died: 28 November 1780 (aged 71); London

François Vivares (Saint-Jean-du-Bruel 11 July 1709 – 28 November 1780 London) was a French landscape-engraver, active in England.

== Life ==
He was born in France at Saint-Jean-du-Bruel, near Montpellier, on 11 July 1709, and brought up in Geneva. At the age of 18 he moved permanently to London.

He took on Peter Paul Benazech as apprentice in 1746. Vivares exhibited engravings with the Incorporated Society of Artists in 1766 and 1768. During the last thirty years of his life he resided in Great Newport Street, central London, where he kept a print-shop. There he died on 28 November 1780, and was buried in Paddington churchyard. He was three times married, and had 31 children. His son Thomas Vivares also worked as an engraver.

== Works ==
His plates number about 160, and were largely published by John Boydell. Many were from the old masters: Claude, Gaspar Poussin, Il Bolognese, Vanderneer, and Cuyp; but a large proportion of them are views of English scenery after Thomas Gainsborough, Wootton, Thomas Smith of Derby, the Smiths of Chichester, and others. Claude's Enchanted Castle he left unfinished at his death, and it was completed by William Woollett. There is a portrait of Vivares, engraved by himself and James Caldwell.

== Notes ==
Attribution

This article incorporates text from a publication now in the public domain: Lee, Sidney, ed. (1899). "Vivares, François". Dictionary of National Biography. Vol. 58. London: Smith, Elder & Co.
