= Christiaan Josi =

Dutch engraver and art dealer

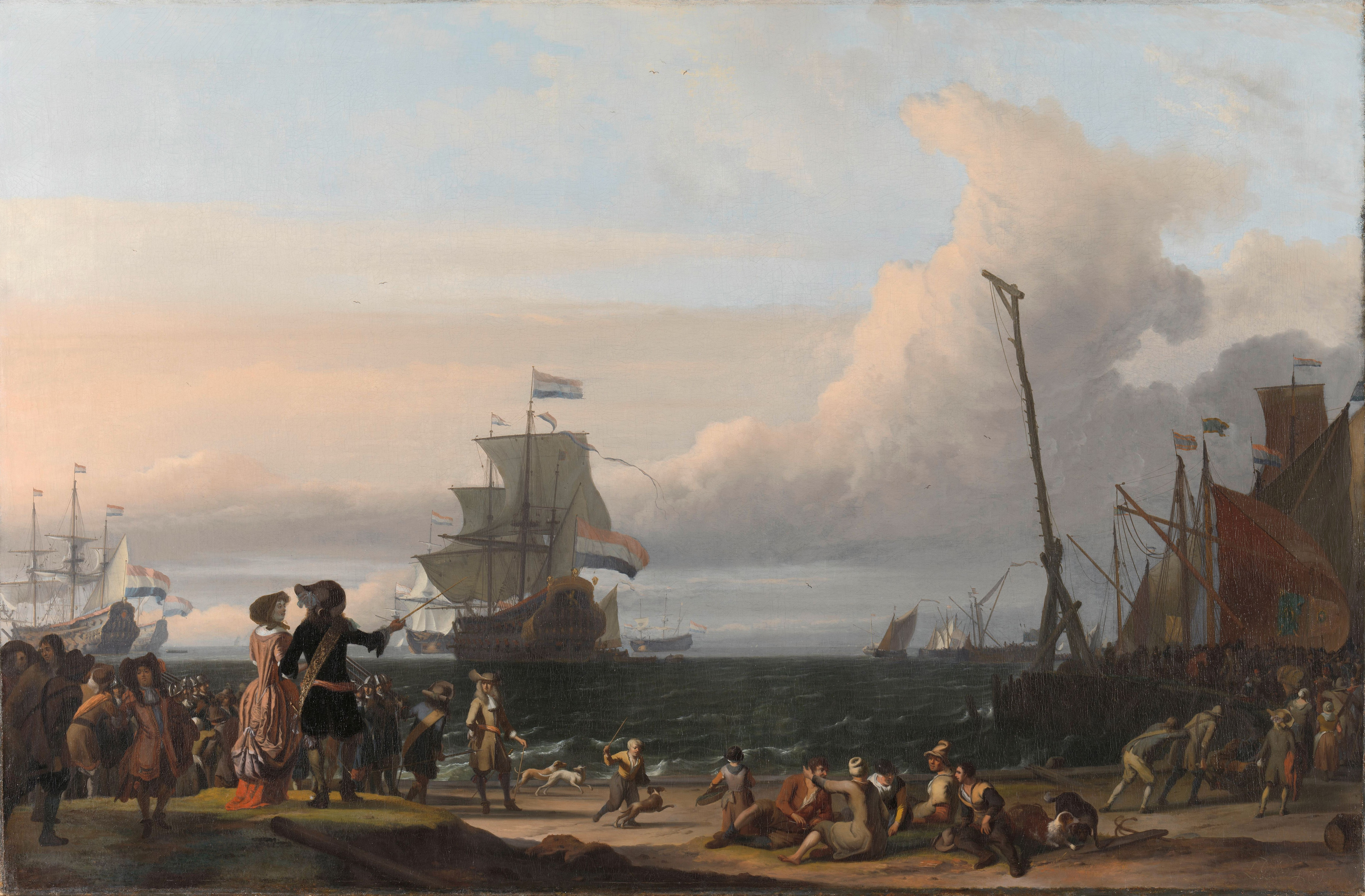

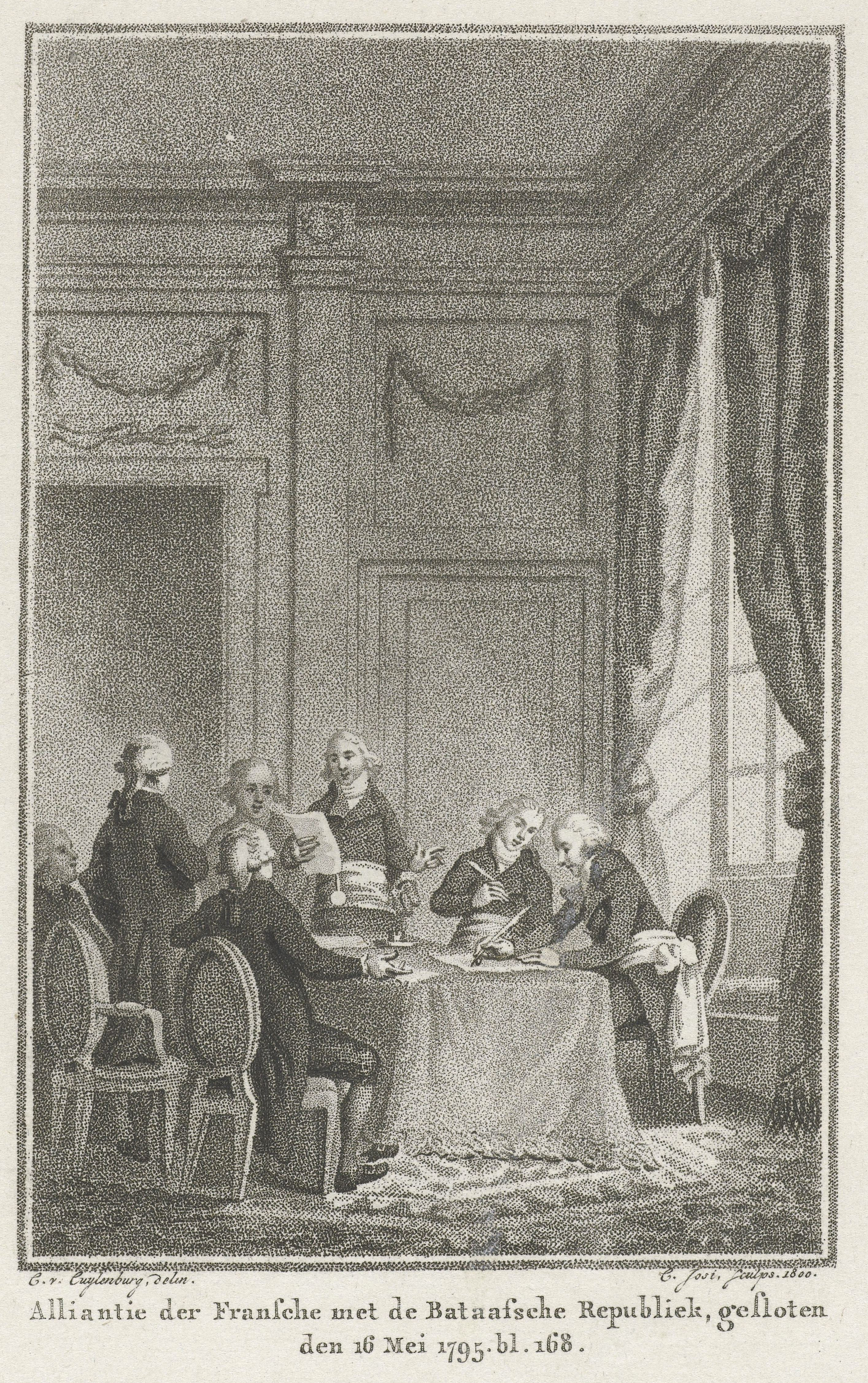

Christiaan Josi (1768–1828) was a Dutch engraver and art dealer.

Josi came from Utrecht, and studied under John Raphael Smith in London. He inherited Cornelis Ploos van Amstel's collections and catalogued his Rembrandt etchings.

Josi's engraving of a portrait of King William I of the Netherlands is held by the National Portrait Gallery, London.
