= Emma Smith (artist) =

British artist (1783–1853)

Emma Smith, later Pauncefote (1783–1853) was a British painter and printmaker.

== Life ==
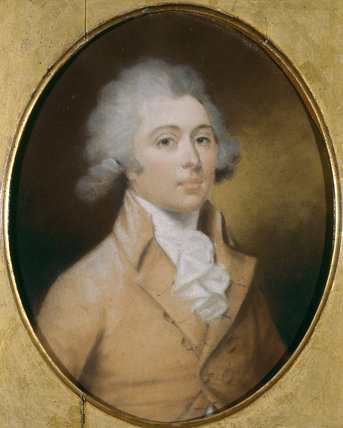
William John Chute by Smith

Smith was born in London, the daughter of John Raphael Smith and his common-law wife, Emma Johnston. She produced pastels and miniature paintings and worked in oils and watercolor, and was active in many genres including portraiture and mythological, religious, and theatrical scenes. One of her portraits was of the politician William John Chute in a pink coat.

Smith was also an engraver, making prints after the work of such artists as Maria Cosway. Between 1799 and 1808 she showed her work at the Royal Academy. Also musical – she played the piano and harp – she was fluent in French. Upon her marriage to Robert Pauncefote she gave up her art. It is said that she so disliked his house, Preston Court, that she traveled frequently to avoid remaining there. The couple were the parents of Julian Pauncefote, 1st Baron Pauncefote, later ambassador of the United Kingdom to the United States. Smith died in Stourfield.
