= William Yates (cartographer) =

18th-century British cartographer (1738 – 1802)

William Yates (1738–1802) was an 18th-century British cartographer. He surveyed land in northern England, mostly in Lancashire.

== Early life ==
Yates grew up in the Low Hill parish of Walton, Liverpool.

== Career ==
Early in his career, Yates was an assistant to Peter Perez Burdett.

In 1769, Yates completed a survey for the Map of the Environs of Liverpool.

Yates' survey of Lancashire (1786), at one inch to the mile, was "one of the eleven English county maps which received national recognition in the period 1759–1809". He received a gold medal from the Society of Arts.

His 1775 trigonometrical survey of Staffordshire was described as "the last production of outstanding importance" before the end of the 18th century.

== Personal life ==
In his will, made in 1802, Yates refers to his children: William Jr, George, Joseph, Sarah, Hannah and Patty.

In the 1770s, he was living in Cleveland Square and working as a customs officer. Twenty years later, he was a resident of West Derby, Liverpool, employed as a surveyor of customs.

== Death ==
Yates died in Liverpool in 1802. He was interred at the city's St Thomas' Church on 30 November.
