= Peter Perez Burdett =

English painter

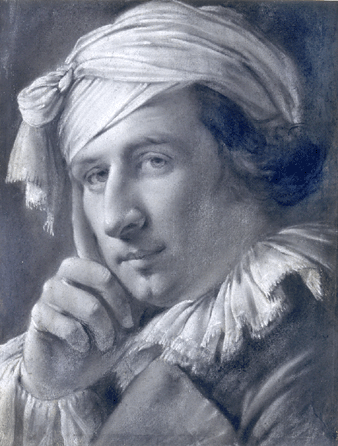
- "Head of a Man" – one of many artworks that Burdett modelled for.
- Born: c. 1734; Eastwood, England
- Died: 9 September 1793 (aged 58–59); Karlsruhe
- Occupations: Cartographer, Artist
- Spouse(s): 1. Hannah Wansell; 2. Friederike Kotkowski
- Children: Anna Nancy Perez Burdett m. Friedrich Gf v Nostitz-Rieneck
- Parent(s): William Burdett and Elizabeth (Perez) Burdett

Peter Perez Burdett (c. 1734 – 9 September 1793) was an 18th-century cartographer, surveyor, artist, and draughtsman originally from Eastwood in Essex where he inherited a small estate and chose the name Perez from the birth surname of his mother, his maternal grandfather was the clergyman there. He would have been notable just for his many appearances in Joseph Wright's pictures but he was also involved with numerous projects including surveying the route for one of the major projects of the industrial revolution, the Leeds and Liverpool Canal, in 1769. He has been described as "if not in the centre at least in the penumbra of the Lunar Society of Birmingham". He spent the last years of his life in Karlsruhe, avoiding debtors, but still active in German society. His German daughter married a Count.

== Biography ==
Perez Burdett was born 1734 or 1735 in Eastwood in Essex, the son of William and Elizabeth Burdett. He inherited a small estate and the name Perez from his maternal grandfather who was the clergyman in Eastwood. Little is known about his early life until Perez met Joseph Wright of Derby early in the 1760s and he was able to borrow money from him to fund his map making. Burdett was a model for several of Wright's paintings and he was able to benefit from his friendship and finance whilst Burdett explained the finer points of perspective to Wright.

In about 1766 Wright painted A Philosopher Giving that Lecture on the Orrery, in which a Lamp is put in place of the Sun (sometimes called simply The Orrery). The painting depicts a public lecture about the solar system, with a lamp—in place of the sun—illuminating the faces of the orrery and the faces of the audience. Consistent with the astronomical theme, the partially illuminated faces may represent the phases of the moon. The figure to the left of the philosopher has been clearly identified as Burdett whilst the man to the right is thought to be Washington Shirley, the Earl of Ferrers who Burdett stayed with at Staunton Harold which is just within Leicestershire. The Earl was, like Perez Burdett, interested in science and he did briefly own this painting.

By 1767 he had produced a map of Derbyshire at a scale of one inch to one mile. With this map Burdett was the second successful claimant of a 1759 challenge made by the Society of Art for those who created county maps at this scale. He produced the aquatint Two Boys Blowing a Bladder by Candle-light.

=== Liverpool ===
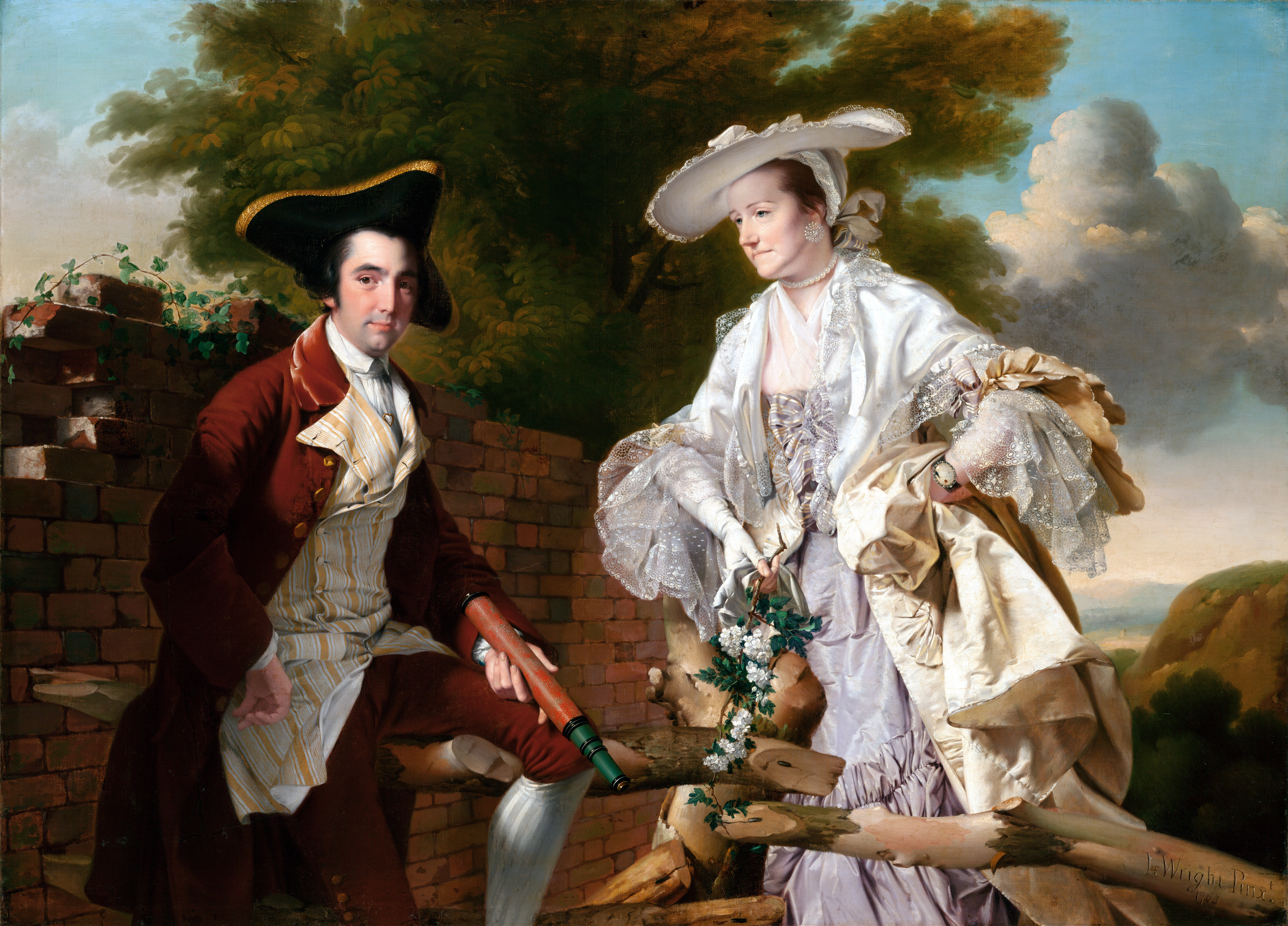
Peter Perez Burdett and His First Wife Hannah by Joseph Wright of Derby, 1765.

In 1768, Perez Burdett moved from Derby to Liverpool to create a map for Lancashire as he had successfully done for Derbyshire. He obtained new patrons and assisted George Perry on his map and history of Liverpool. Burdett created drawings and wrote descriptions of major buildings for Perry's history of 1773.

Burdett was so successful at identifying and exploiting his new contacts that he invited his friend, Wright, to join him in Liverpool. This was a successful move for Wright too and he quickly received commissions from the local gentry and merchants, however it was Burdett who founded a Society of Artists in 1769 in Liverpool and became its first president. An Academy by Lamplight, a 1769 painting by Joseph Wright of Derby is thought to be of Burdett's academy.

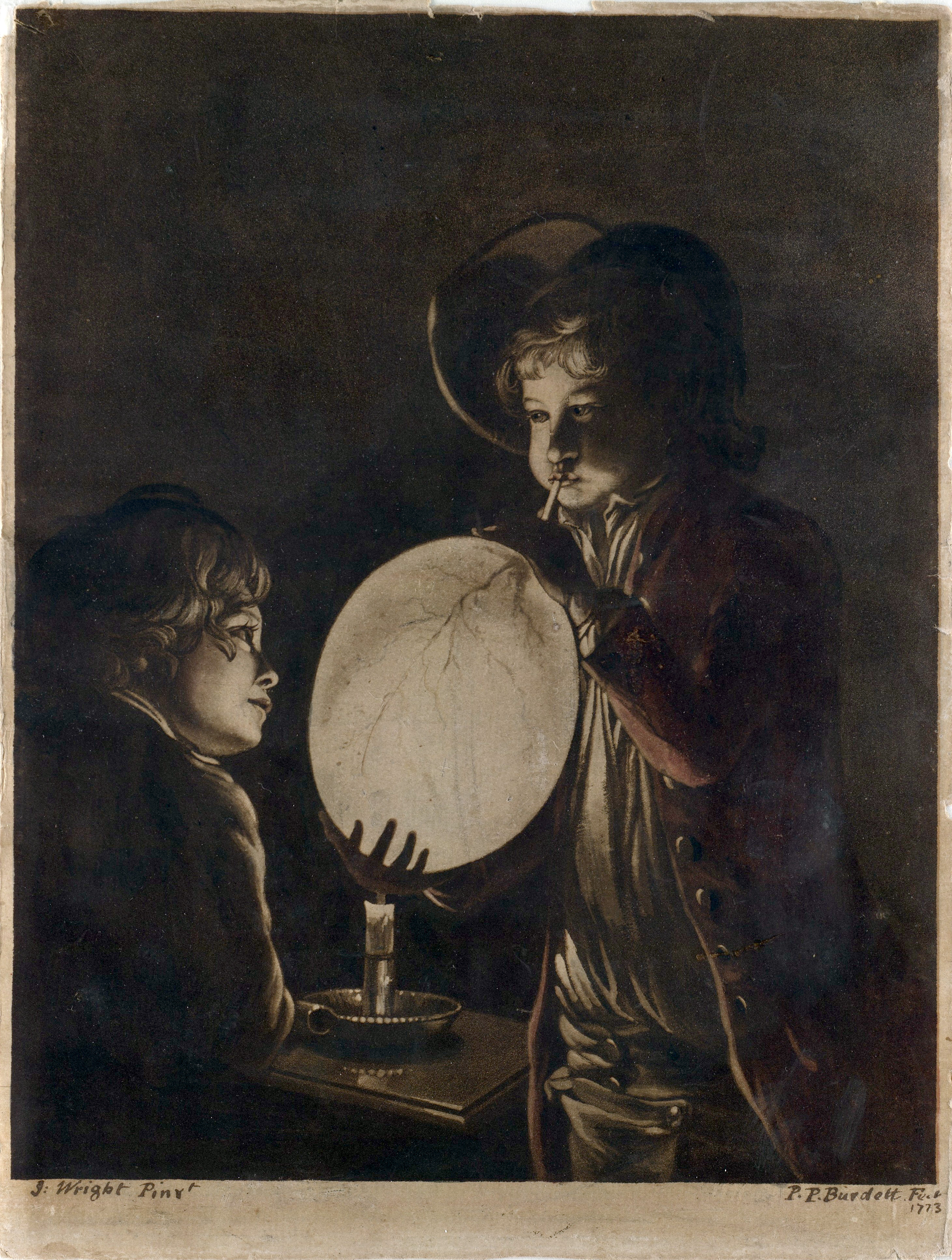
Two Boys Blowing a Bladder by Candle-light. An early aquatint by Burdet after Joseph Wright of Derby.

The first British aquatint artist is thought to be Perez Burdett, who exhibited these first aquatints in 1772. Burdett brushed acid direct on to an aquatint ground, only using varnish to stop-off large areas of a single tone. His technique appears to have been novel and was different from early methods developed in France. Burdett published a first aquatint based on an image by John Hamilton Mortimer, but he eventually sold the process to another cartographer, Paul Sandby. Burdett also developed a process for transferring aquatint to pottery; it was not a success.

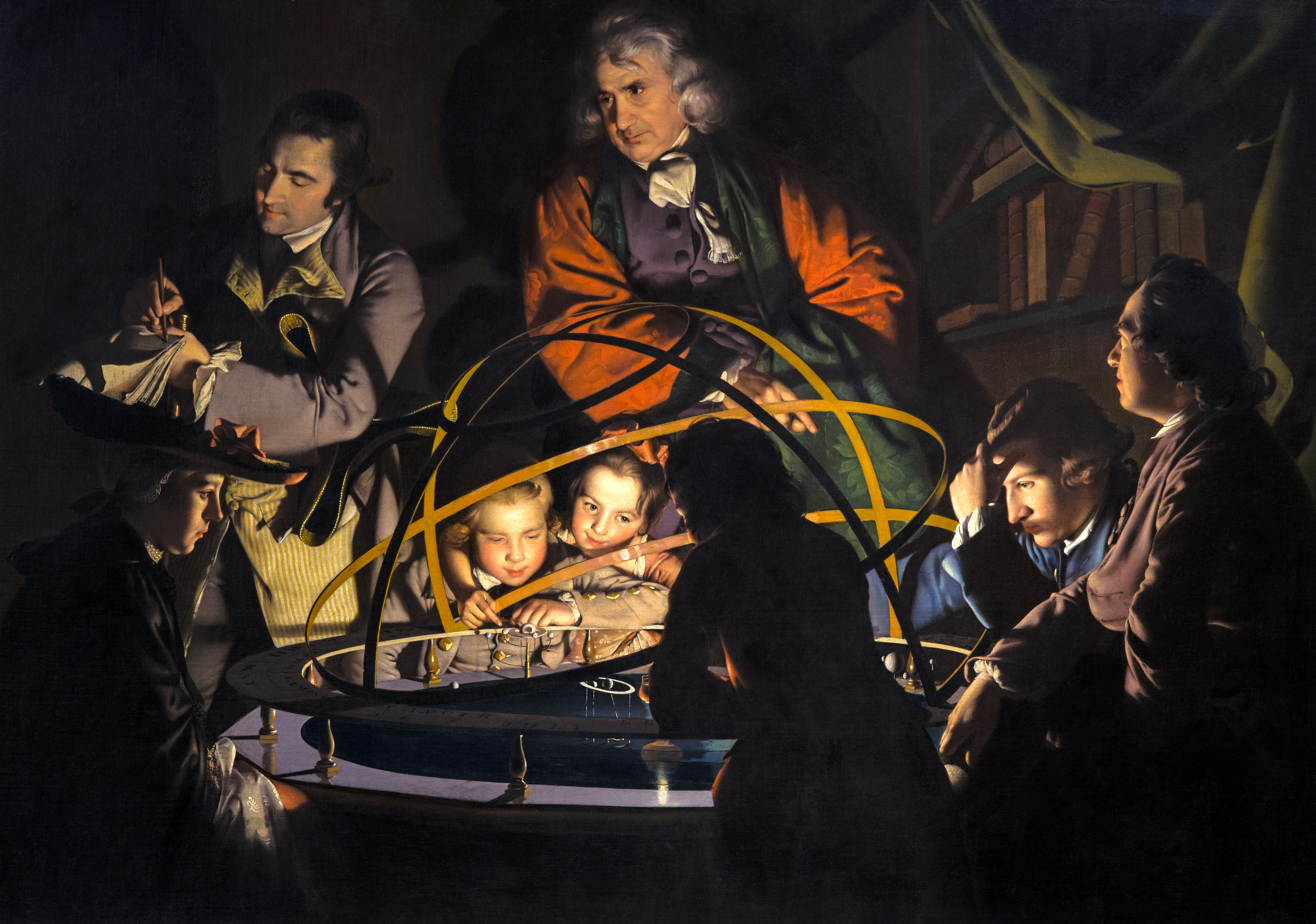
A Philosopher Lecturing on the Orrery by Joseph Wright of Derby. Use a cursor to see who is who.

Perez Burdett learnt his aquatint technique from J.B. Le Prince of Paris. He showed two plates at the Society of Arts Exhibition of 1772, An Etching in imitation of a Wash Drawing and An Etching from a design of Mr. Mortimer. In 1773 he exhibited a plate entitled The effect of a stained drawing attempted by printing from a plate wrought chemically, without the use of any instrument of sculpture. There are extant three known images by Burdett, Banditti Terrifying Fishermen of 1771 and Skeleton on a Rocky Shore, both after the painter J.H. Mortimer, and Two Boys Blowing a Bladder by Candle-light after Wright of Derby. A copy of the latter in Liverpool Public Library bears on its back the inscription "First Speciman of aquatinta invented in Liverpool by P.P. Burdett, 1774, assisted by Mr. S. Chubbard".

The artist Paul Sandby learnt the basic techniques of aquatint from the Hon. Charles Greville, who himself had purchased the knowledge either from Burdett or from Le Prince. It appears that Greville had received incomplete information, and Sandby found it difficult to produce a plate by Le Prince's method of sifting the rosin over the surface. He discovered that by dissolving the rosin and floating it on the copper a better effect was obtained.

Benjamin Franklin wrote to Perez Burdett on 21 August 1773 "I should be glad to be inform’d where I can see some example of the new Art you mention of printing in Imitation of Paintings. It must be a most valuable Discovery: but more likely to meet with adequate Encouragement on this side the water than on ours".

In 1771 he produced 'A Chart for the Harbour of Liverpool'. and in 1772 Survey of the County Palatine of Chester.

=== Karlsruhe ===
In 1774 he left Liverpool, to escape debt, and entered the service of Charles Frederick, Grand Duke of Baden. He took with him the double portrait by Joseph Wright of himself and his first wife, leaving her behind to face his debtors. The painting is now in the collection of the National Gallery of Prague; it recently returned for an exhibition in Liverpool, the second time the work was seen in the United Kingdom since it departed from Liverpool with Burdett in the eighteenth century.

He did not leave his friends entirely and Wright visited him in 1774 in south Germany. He married again to Friederike Kotkowski in Germany on 11 July 1787 and he had a daughter Anna, who went on to marry a count. In the same year he was drawing up plans for Karlsruhe marketplace whose outline can still be seen in the layout of today's buildings.

Perez Burdett died in Karlsruhe on 9 September 1793.

Perez Burdett has been described as "if not in the centre at least in the penumbra of the Lunar Society of Birmingham". He was a correspondent of Benjamin Franklin who was an early member of the Lunar Society which included such figures as Erasmus Darwin, John Whitehurst, Matthew Boulton, Joseph Priestley, Josiah Wedgwood and James Watt.

== Major works ==
- Derbyshire map surveyed and produced by Peter Perez Burdett (1762–1767)
- Two Boys Blowing a Bladder by Candle-light. An aquatint after Joseph Wright of Derby

== See also ==
- William Yates, Perez Burdett's assistant
