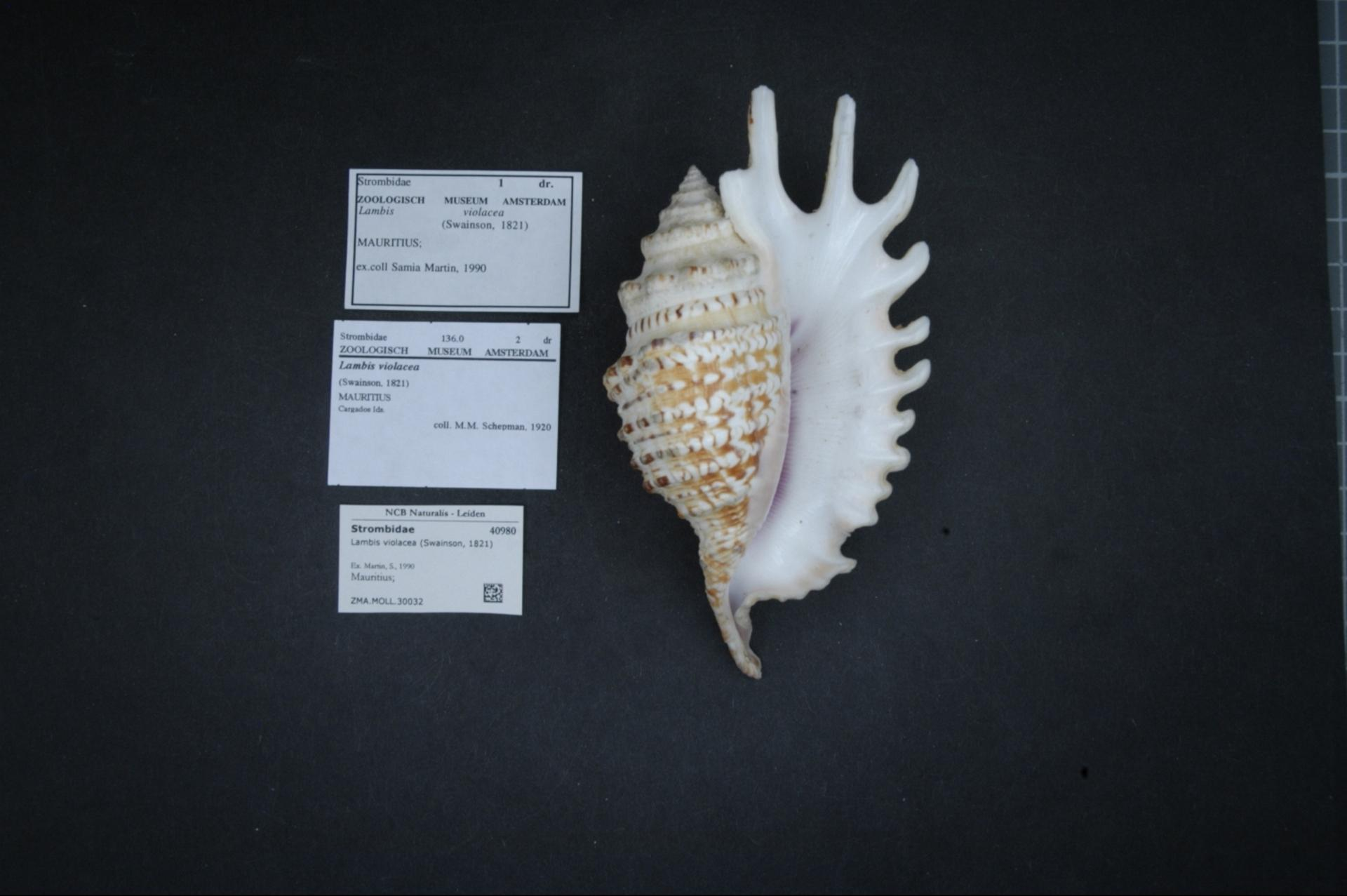
- Apertural view of a shell of O. violacea, from the Naturalis Biodiversity Center

Conservation status
- Data Deficient (IUCN 2.3)

Scientific classification
- Kingdom: Animalia
- Phylum: Mollusca
- Class: Gastropoda
- Subclass: Caenogastropoda
- Order: Littorinimorpha
- Family: Strombidae
- Genus: Ophioglossolambis
- Species: O. violacea

Binomial name
- Ophioglossolambis violacea (Swainson, 1821)

Synonyms
- Lambis violacea (Swainson, 1821); Pterocera multipes Sowerby II, 1842; Pterocera violacea Swainson, 1821 (basionym)

= Ophioglossolambis violacea =

Species of gastropod

Ophioglossolambis violacea is a species of large sea snail, a marine gastropod mollusk in the family Strombidae family, the true conchs and their allies.

== Distribution ==
This species is endemic to St. Brandon, Mauritius and, possibly, to the Mascarene basin.
