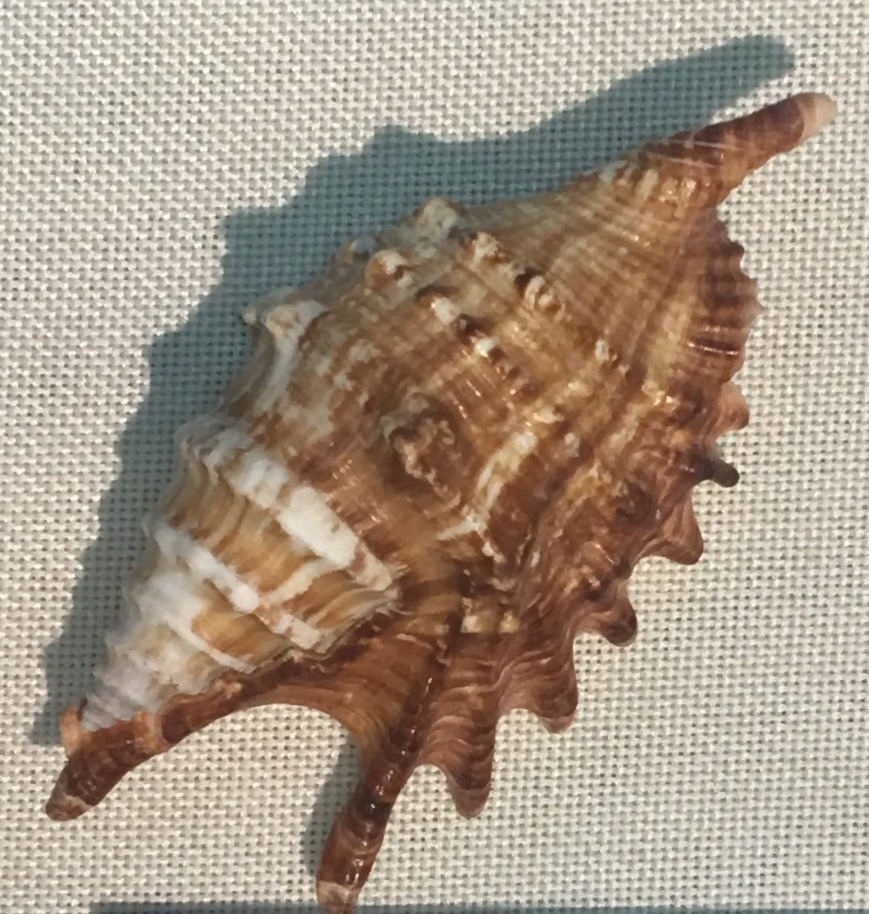
- Shell of Ophioglossolambis digitata at the Natural History Museum of Guangxi

Scientific classification
- Kingdom: Animalia
- Phylum: Mollusca
- Class: Gastropoda
- Subclass: Caenogastropoda
- Order: Littorinimorpha
- Family: Strombidae
- Genus: Ophioglossolambis
- Species: O. digitata

Binomial name
- Ophioglossolambis digitata (Perry, 1811)

Synonyms
- Lambis digitata (Perry, 1811); Pterocera crocea Reeve, 1842; Pterocera elongata Swainson, 1841; Pterocera novemdactylis Deshayes, 1843; Strombus digitatus Perry, 1811 (basionym)

= Ophioglossolambis digitata =

Species of gastropod

Ophioglossolambis digitata is a species of sea snail, a marine gastropod mollusk in the family Strombidae, the true conchs.

== Distribution ==
This species occurs in the Indian Ocean off Kenya, Madagascar, the Mascarene Basin, Mauritius, Mozambique, Réunion and Tanzania.
