= Solo exhibition =

One-person art exhibition

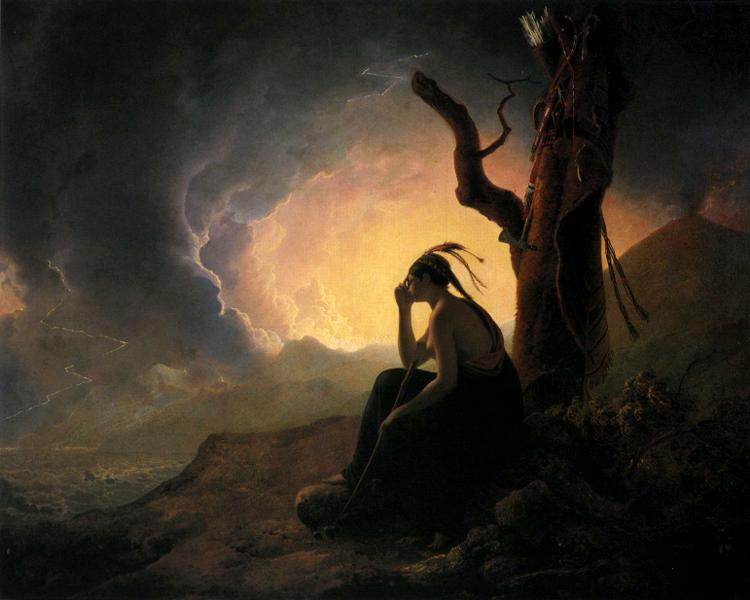
Indian Widow was exhibited at the first recorded solo exhibition of art in Britain, held by Joseph Wright of Derby during 1785

A solo show or solo exhibition is an exhibition of the work of only one artist. Rather than a group of artists who collaborate to form an exhibition. The artwork may be paintings, drawings, etchings, collage, sculpture, or photography. The creator of any artistic technique may be the subject of a solo show. Other skills and crafts have similar types of shows for the creators. Having solo shows of one's artwork marks the achievement of success and usually is accompanied by receptions and a great deal of publicity. The show may be of current work being produced, those from a single time period, or representative work from different periods in the career of the artist, the latter is termed a retrospective.

== History ==
Art exhibitions have a history that dates back to 1623. It is thought that the first solo exhibition in Britain was staged by Joseph Wright of Derby in 1785, the year after he refused to become a Royal Academician.

Art galleries became numerous in large cities during the nineteenth century and flourished during the twentieth century, often becoming included among stores in small towns as well, after the middle of the twentieth century.

Generally, as artists begin to show their work they are accepted by commercial gallery owners for display among the works of many or among others who work in the same area. The works of the artists are sold and the galleries take commissions. As artists gain stature and attract a following who will purchase their works in greater numbers, gallery owners will promote their works in solo shows with a great deal of publicity about the show. The artists with the greatest appeal to a gallery's clients may be invited to be represented by that gallery consistently, developing a constant relationship that even may develop into exclusive rights to offer the sale of the works by those artists.

Once artists become recognized for their skills among critics and collectors through representation at galleries, museum directors and staff members may begin to purchase the works of the artists for museum collections. Museums also hold exhibitions that change regularly and may choose to feature a solo show of the works of an artist as one of these exhibitions. Works that are gathered on loan from many other museums or collectors also may be scheduled for exhibition at one museum as a solo show. Planning for the exhibitions is a long process. Museums schedule their exhibitions for a given year well in advance and their negotiations may begin years before the shows are held.

Some artists create a large number of works that they reserve as a traveling exhibition that generates income for them as they travel around the world for decades as solo shows at museums and galleries. Typically, the contract arrangements for booking such a large exhibition are that the hosting organization pays a fee to the artist, arranges for the safe delivery, set up, and return of the exhibition, and it charges admission to those attracted to the exhibition by extensive publicity generated by the host and approved by the artist.

The term "one-man show" was used at times to describe these art exhibitions, but has fallen out of favor, even though the term "one-man show" persists to describe a solo performance among some entertainment venues and performing arts.
