= The Captive (painting) =

Painting by Joseph Wright of Derby

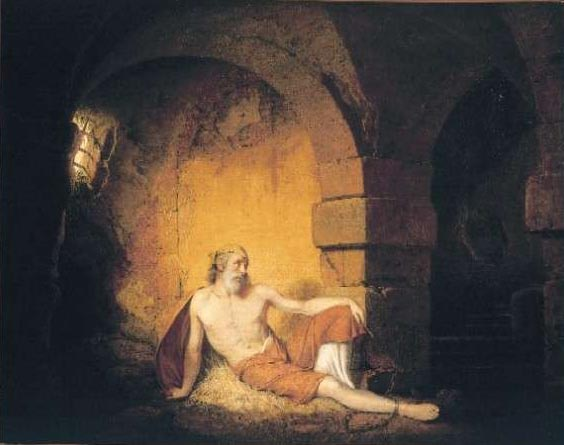
- Artist: Joseph Wright of Derby
- Year: 1778
- Dimensions: 101.6 cm × 127 cm (40.0 in × 50 in)
- Location: Derby Museum and Art Gallery; Derby

Sterne's Captive
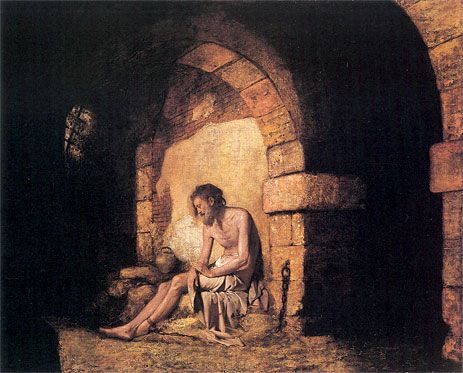
- Artist: Joseph Wright of Derby
- Year: 1774
- Dimensions: 102 cm × 127.5 cm (40 in × 50.2 in)
- Location: Vancouver Art Gallery; Vancouver, British Columbia, Canada

The Captive, from Sterne is a painting by Joseph Wright of Derby completed in 1774 and now in the National Gallery of Canada. Sterne's Captive, first exhibited by the artist in 1778, is a similar painting by Wright in the Derby Museum and Art Gallery. The latter painting resulted in a rare engraving, as its purchaser commissioned a print run of only twenty copies before the copper printing plate was destroyed. In 2012, Derby Museum commissioned another Captive painting from Emma Tooth.

== Description ==
Both paintings show the despair of a traveller who finds himself abandoned in a foreign jail. The Captive title is based on the section of the same name in Laurence Sterne's A Sentimental Journey Through France and Italy (1768). In the episode in question, the hero of the story, Yorick, imagines that he is imprisoned in the Bastille because he has lost his passport. Yorick is later released because his name is taken to indicate that he is an important person, because he is a court jester: Yorick is a jester in Shakespeare's play Hamlet. The journey takes place in 1762, when Britain was at war with France, and imprisonment was a real possibility for a traveller from a hostile country.

== History ==
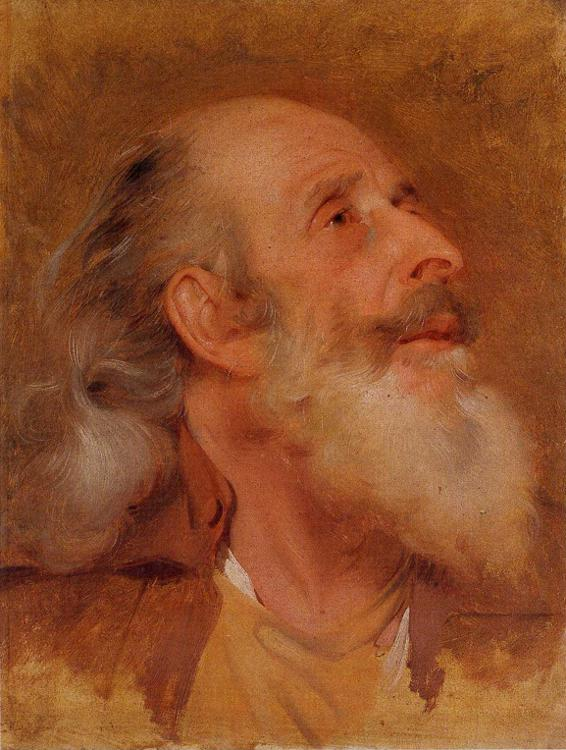
A study of John Stavely for Wright's second version

The pose of the model in Wright's first painting is the same as that used by Michelangelo when painting The Creation of Adam on the ceiling of the Sistine Chapel. And the first captive painting was made by Wright while in Rome in 1774. After its completion he had to import it back into Britain; Llewellyn Jewitt records that he nearly imported it free of tax but a late objection obliged him to pay import tax. The debate focused on whether the sitter was Roman and it was argued that the sitter should have been better dressed.

The first painting was made into a stipple engraving by Thomas Ryder in 1779 and it was published by John and Josiah Boydell in 1786. However an earlier mezzotint engraving by John Raphael Smith of the later 1778 painting had been commissioned by John Milnes after he bought the painting at a Royal Academy show. Milnes obtained a print of every Wright painting that he could, but the print that he commissioned of his own painting was limited to just twenty copies before the plate was destroyed. This engraving is now exceptionally rare and is only available in a small number of British institutions and none abroad.

The Captive
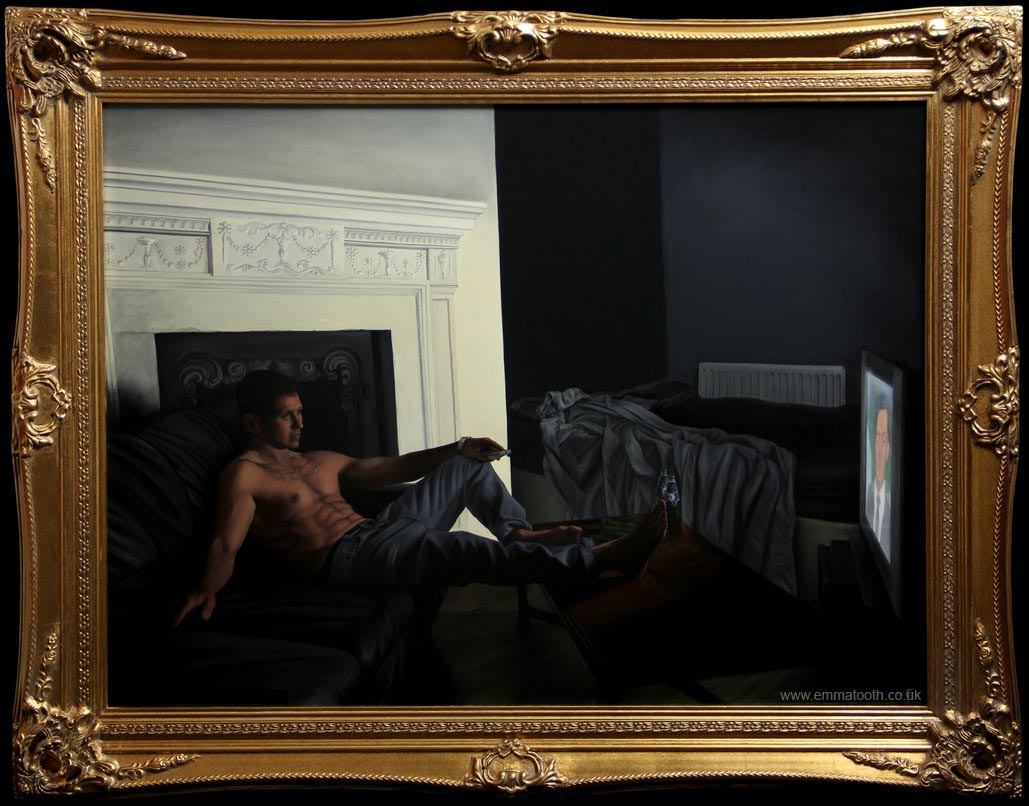
- Artist: Emma Tooth
- Year: 2011
- Location: Derby Museum and Art Gallery; Derby

== Inspiration ==
The Captive paintings were inspired by Laurence Sterne's novel, but Wright's paintings have inspired other works. In 2012, Derby Museum commissioned the British artist Emma Tooth to create a painting based on Wright's paintings. She chose to mimic the construction of The Captive. She took the classical pose of the captive in Wright's version and moved it to a modern man who has chosen to waste his time in front of the television. Tooth noted that the man in the painting (and the model) has "don’t count the days, make the days count" tattooed on his chest.
