= George Perry (engineer) =

English engineer, ironmaster, merchant, draughtsman and cartographer

George Perry (1719 – 3 February 1771) was an English engineer, ironmaster, merchant, draughtsman and cartographer.

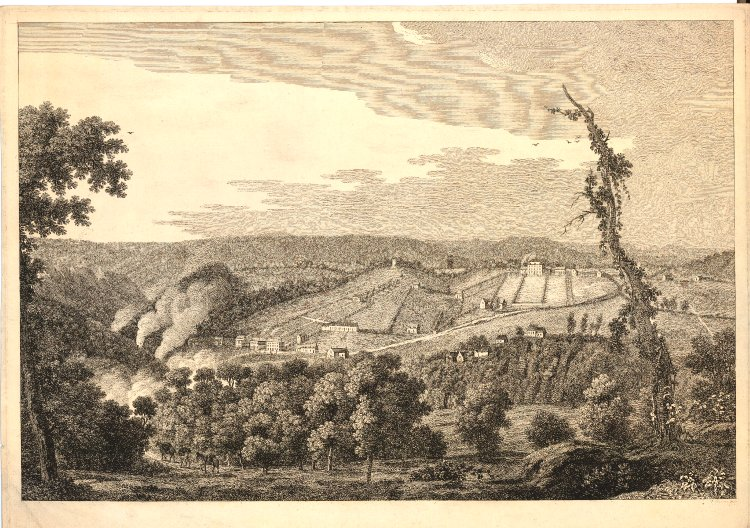
South West Prospect of Coalbrook Dale, 1758 engraving by François Vivares after Thomas Smith and Perry

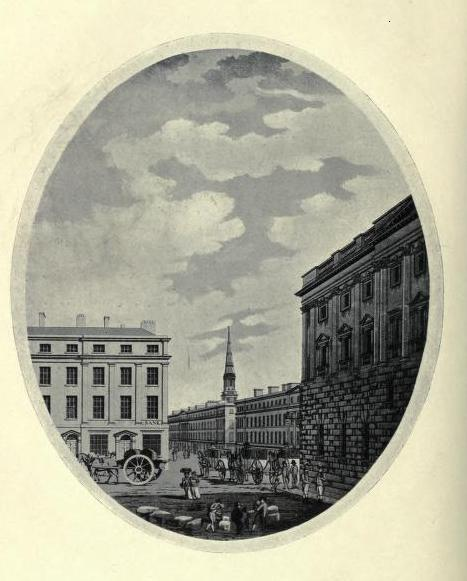
Castle Street, Liverpool, engraving by Thomas Malton after a drawing by Perry.

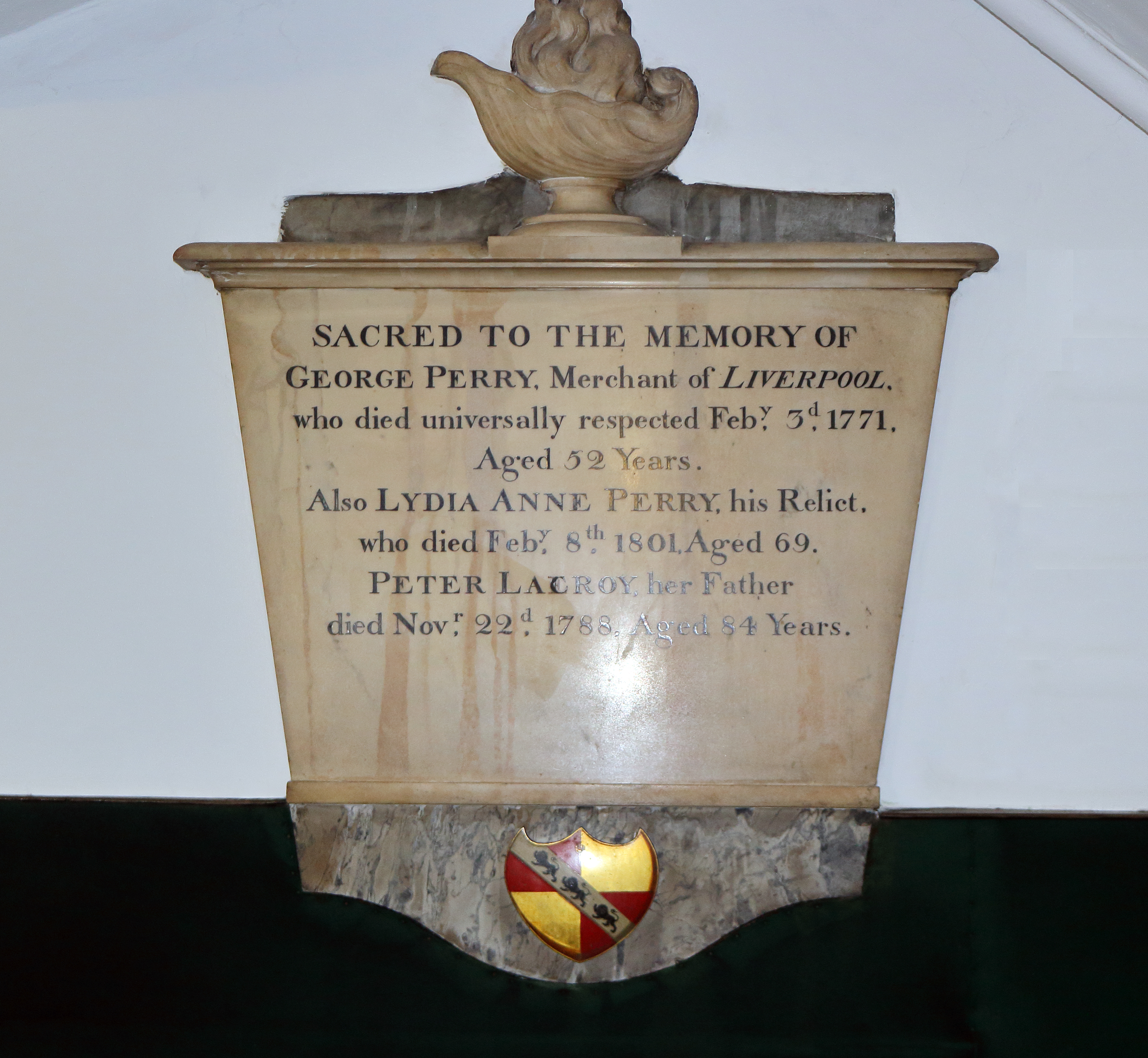
Memorial to Perry, Ancient Chapel of Toxteth

== Biography ==
Perry was a native of Somerset and was related to Micajah Perry, Lord Mayor of London in 1747. His family was well known in the area and Perry was "intended for the church". However Perry joined the iron works at Coalbrookdale, where he worked with John Wilkinson. While there, he made successful trials for boring cannon from solid iron. With Thomas Smith of Derby he designed views of Coalbrookdale which were engraved by François Vivares. These are among the earliest industrial landscapes.

Perry later became the first manager of Liverpool's Phoenix Foundry. A man of many talents, outside his work as an iron founder and merchant his energy was directed towards many diffuse interests, such as map-making, the history of Liverpool, and the writing of poetry.

Perry was an early promoter of the benefits of new canals. In 1758, shortly after the opening of the early Sankey Canal, Perry wrote an article which appeared in The Gentleman's Magazine in which he proposed the construction of an "inland water conveyance from London to Gloucester, Worcester and Bristol, or from Liverpool to Hull".

In 1758 Perry founded a Liverpool branch of the Ironbridge foundry, later to become the Fawcett, Preston Engineering Company, although initially simply a warehouse.

In 1765, Perry married Lydia Ann Lacroy (or De La Croix), who was of a family of Huguenots. The street in which his foundry stood was named in her honour Lydia Ann Street.

With Peter Perez Burdett Perry had planned a map of Liverpool, together with a history and views by Michael Angelo Rooker, though the latter project did not all come together in its initial conception before his death. In 1769, assisted by William Yates, Perry produced his masterpiece as a cartographer, a large map entitled 'The New and Accurate Plan of the Town and Port of Leverpool'. In 2008 this was on public display at the Walker Art Gallery and proved to be a centre of attention.

Perry died on 3 February 1771 at the age of 52 and was buried at Toxteth Unitarian Chapel. On a wall of the chapel is a memorial tablet, reading

Sacred to the memory of George Perry, merchant, of Liverpool, who died, universally respected, February 3, 1771, aged 52.

The foundry business was taken over by Joseph Rathbone of the Rathbone family, who had married a daughter of Abraham Darby II, the owner of the Coalbrookdale operation.

An Essay towards the History of Leverpool [sic] (1773) by William Enfield was based on Perry’s collections, and has been called the first history of Liverpool.
