= The Blacksmith's Shop =

Paintings by Joseph Wright of Derby

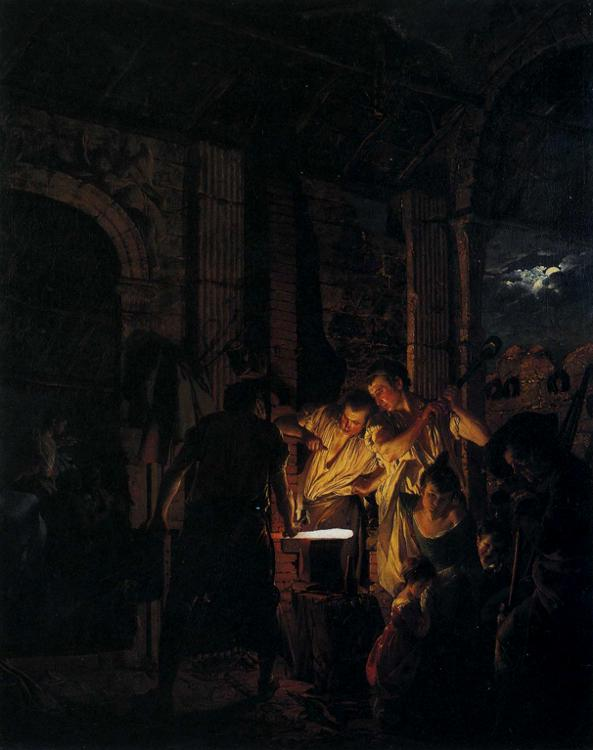
- Artist: Joseph Wright of Derby
- Year: 1771
- Location: Derby Museum and Art Gallery; Derby

The Blacksmith's Shop
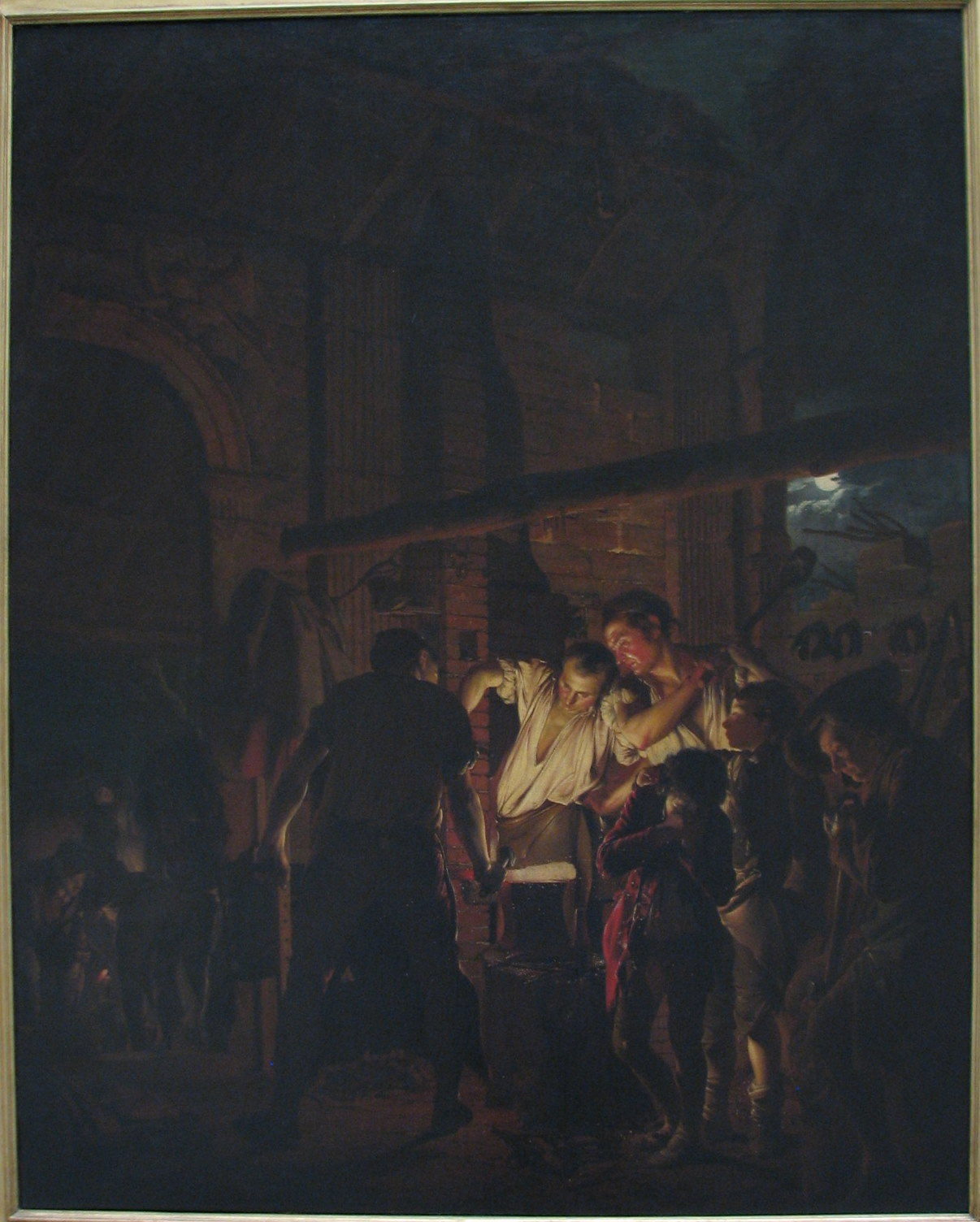
- Artist: Joseph Wright of Derby
- Year: 1771
- Location: Yale Center for British Art

An Iron Forge
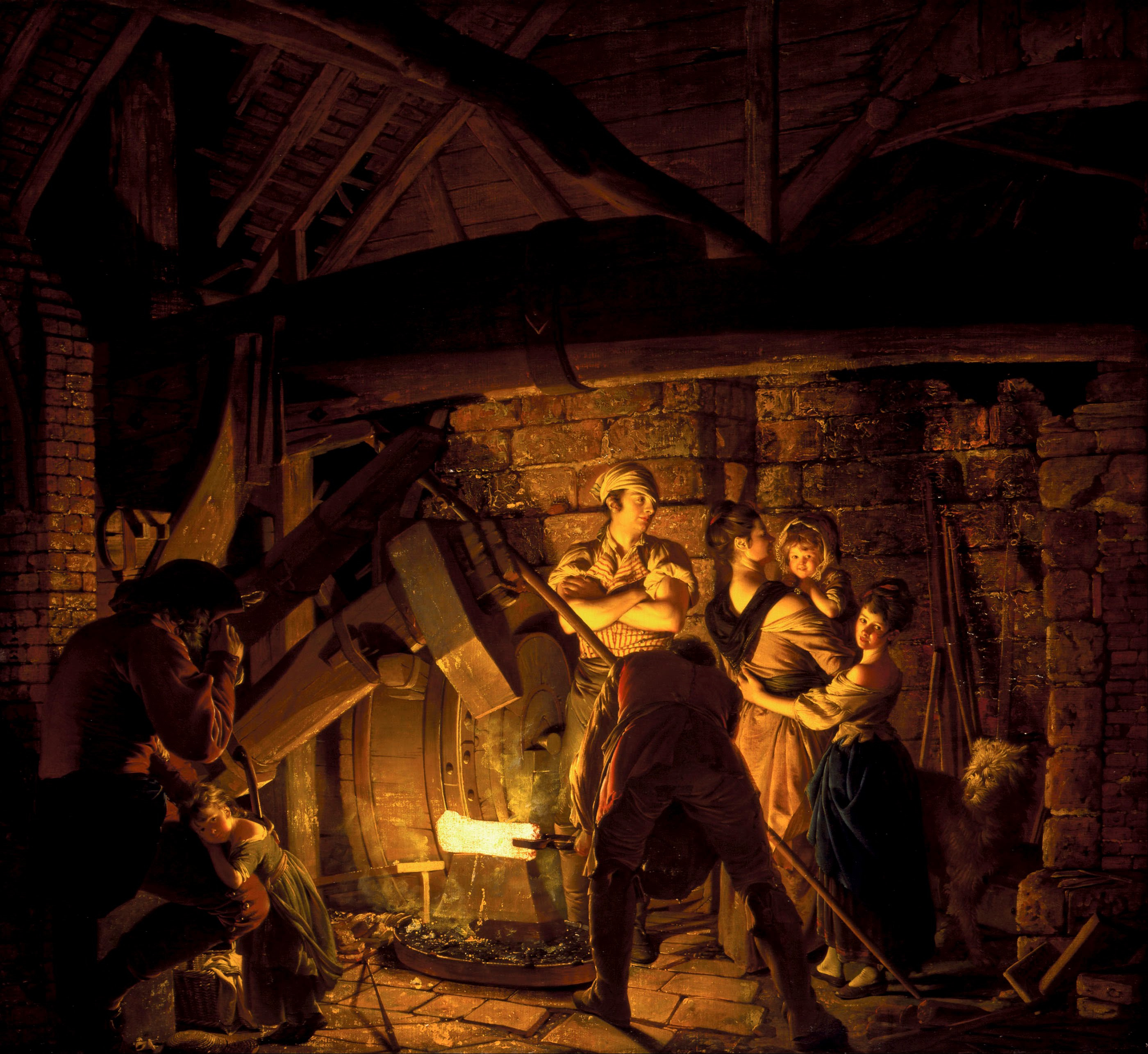
- Artist: Joseph Wright of Derby
- Year: 1772
- Location: Tate Britain

The Blacksmith's Shop is a recurring theme of five paintings by Joseph Wright of Derby. The version in his hometown was originally completed in 1771.

== Description ==
Joseph Wright of Derby painted five paintings on the theme of a blacksmith's shop or a forge between the years 1771 and 1773. The Derby Museum version is of a blacksmith's shop where three men work to manufacture an iron or steel component. The presence of visitors and the nocturnal work is explained by the farrier working outside. Wright has imagined that a traveller has broken down on a journey and the farrier is therefore working by the light of a candle. This device allows Wright to show off his skill and interest in light and shadow. To the right of the picture is an idle man leaning on a stick. Nicholson notes that this person is not dealt with harshly but with respect. The man appears too old to work but offers gravitas to those that are. Investigations of one of Wright's blacksmith's paintings has revealed the lengths that Wright went to achieve his image. Beneath the image of the ingot and hidden by layers of both yellow and white investigators found a small piece of gold leaf that Wright had placed there two centuries before. The gold is not thought to have added to the painting, but Wright obviously thought it might in some way.

== Other Versions ==
Later versions which involve a forge rather than a blacksmith's more traditional way of working are now in the Hermitage Museum in St Petersburg and in The Tate in London. In these the main figure is working with a power forge whilst he is observed by his family. The nocturnal nature of Wright's "night pieces" was different to his contemporaries. The real novelty was however in the subject matter. Water-powered forges were not new, but Wright was being innovative in proposing that these scenes could be the subject of a fine artist. For this reason Wrights paintings are frequently used as a symbol of the Industrial Revolution and The Enlightenment. Wright was an important figure in relation to the Lunar Society and Derby Philosophical Society whose members were shaping the development of Science and Engineering in England. In 1772, Wright created a 44 by 52-inch variation on this theme called The Iron Forge which was sold to Lord Palmerston for 200 pounds. This version is still in the Palmerstone family. Another 41 by 55-inch version titled An Iron Forge viewed from without was sold to Empress Catherine of Russia. Catherine the great later bought two other Wright paintings; one was of fireworks and another was from his Vesuvius paintings, however the painting of the forge was considered the best of the three.

Another 1771 version was titled The Blacksmith's Shop and this sold to Peniston Lamb, 1st Viscount Melbourne. It remained in the Melbourne family until it was purchased and given to Down House where it joined the collection in memory of Charles Darwin. This version is now in the Mellon collection.

An Iron Forge develops the idea of blacksmith's shop which is a craft that has changed little on hundreds of years. Forges seen in the 1772 pension show the addition of water-powered hammers that allow the forger to stand proud before his family. The painting is in the Tate. A similar painting of a forge but viewed from outside is in the Hermitage Museum.

== Provenance ==
The 1771 painting was bought by the ArtFund and Derby Museum and Art Gallery in 1979 for approximately 69,000 pounds from the Greg family who had owned it since 1875.
