= George Perry (naturalist) =

English naturalist and malacologist

- Born: 30 April 1771; Liverpool
- Died: 1823 age about 42; Chelsea, London
- Known for: Arcana; or the museum of natural history (1810–1811), Conchology, or the natural history of shells (1811)
- Parents: George Perry (father); Lydia Anne Perry (mother)
- Scientific career
- Fields: Naturalist, artist, malacologist

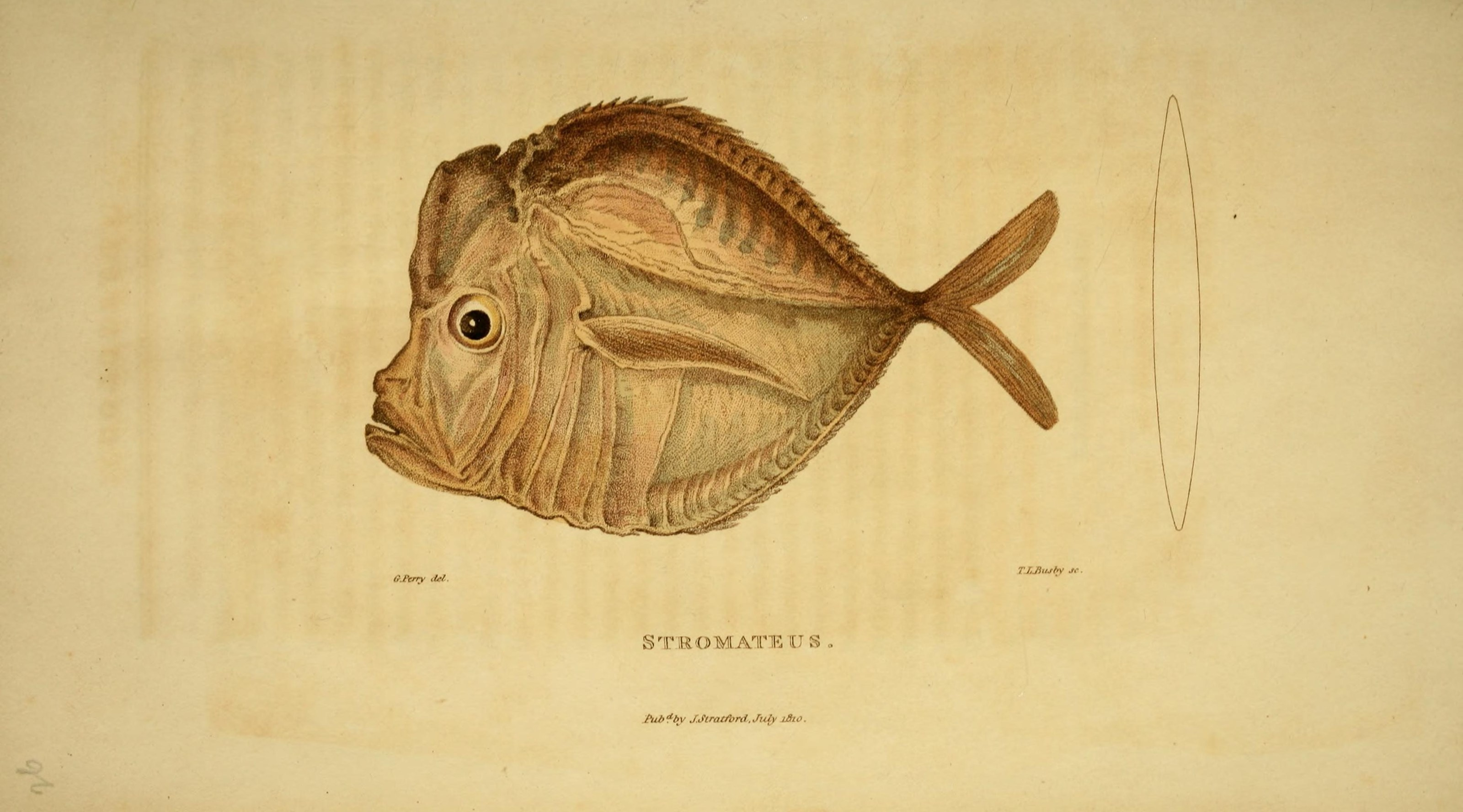
Plate from Arcana

George Perry (30 April 1771–1823) was a 19th-century English naturalist, artist, and malacologist. He was the son of the industrialist George Perry. He lived in Liverpool for some time, authoring The History of Liverpool with John Corry before moving back to London. He died in Chelsea in 1823.

Perry was born in Liverpool to George Perry (c.1718–1771) and Lydia Anne Perry (c.1731–1801). His father had died three months before he was born. His older brother William (1767–1835) became a dentist in Liverpool. Their father had been interested in the history of Liverpool and his research was published posthumously by William Enfield in 1773. George also took an interest in this research. In 1796 he is noted for designing a monument in St. Nicholas Church to the late Alderman John Tarleton. He married Elisabeth Marrow, daughter of broker Robert Marrow (1740–1781), of Liverpool on 16 August 1798 at St Thomas’s Church. He was described as an architect and sculptor in records. His interest in natural history was likely encouraged by the Liverpool banker and abolitionist, William Roscoe (1753–1831) and botanical lectures by Sir James Edward Smith (1759–1828) that were organized by Roscoe. Perry also attended lectures in chemistry given by John Stancliffe (1774–1816). In 1806 his wife died and in 1807 Perry, described as “Marble Merchant, Dealer and Chapman”, was declared bankrupt. This was also a period when the debate on abolition of slave trade had polarized Liverpool. Perry had sided with Roscoe against the slave trade. It was around this period that Perry shifted to London and began to concentrate on natural history studies.

Perry is known for two natural history works:

- Arcana; or the museum of natural history, published monthly from January 1810 to September 1811
- Conchology, or the natural history of shells, published in 1811

== See also ==
- Category:Taxa named by George Perry (naturalist)

== Other sources ==
- J. H. Gatliff, 1902. Notes on Perry's “Conchology”. Victorian Naturalist 19(5):75-76
- C. Hedley, 1902. On Perry's Australian shells. Proceedings of the Linnean Society of New South Wales 27(1): 24-28
- G. M. Mathews & T. Iredale, 1913. “Perry’s Arcana” – an overlooked work. Victorian Naturalist 29: 7-16
- A. T. Hopwood, 1946. Miscellaneous notes. 1. Perry's ‘Conchology”. Proceedings of the Malacological Society of London 26(6):152-153
- J. Q. Burch, 1958. Perry's Conchology. Minutes of the Conchological Club of Southern California 178: 2-3
- R. I. Johnson, 1970. Perry's Conchology (1811) – more than one edition. Journal of the Society for the Bibliography of Natural History 5(4): 287
- A. J. Kohn, 1986. Type specimens and identity of the described species of Conus. VII. The species described 1810-1820. Zoological Journal of the Linnean Society 86(1): 1-41 [Perry: pp. 2–9]
- R. E. Petit & J. Le Renard, 1990. George Perry's fossil molluscan taxa, published in the ‘Arcana’ (1810-1811). Contributions to Tertiary and Quaternary Geology 27(1): 27-35
- R. E. Petit, 2009. Perry's Arcana. A facsimile edition with a collation and systematic review. Philadelphia, Pennsylvania: Temple University, viii + 568 pp., incl. 84 pls.
